= Legend of the Dragon (TV series) =

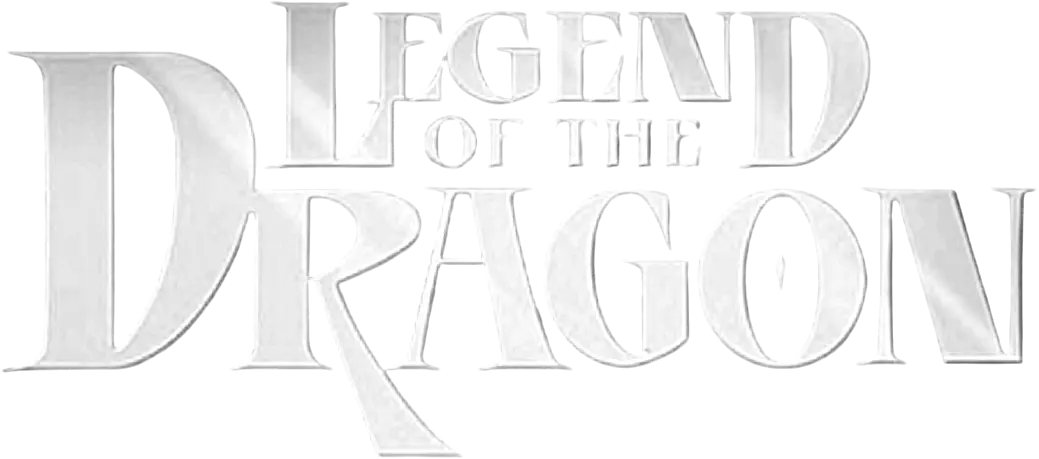
- Genre: Action; Adventure
- Created by: Rick Ungar
- Developed by: Sean Catherine Derek
- Directed by: Rich Arons; Tom Sito; Tom Tataranowicz
- Voices of: Alan Marriott; Gary Martin
- Countries of origin: United Kingdom; Germany
- Original languages: English; German
- No. of seasons: 2
- No. of episodes: 39 (list of episodes)

Production
- Executive producers: Allen Bohbot; Rick Ungar
- Producer: David Freedman
- Production company: BKN International

Original release
- Network: CBBC
- Release: 29 July 2005 – 19 March 2008

Legend of the Dragon is an animated television series produced by BKN International for CBBC lasting 39 episodes. The show follows Ang, The Golden Dragon, as he protects the twelve zodiac temples against his sister, Ling, the Shadow Dragon.

== Synopsis ==
The show begins with the passing of the previous Golden Dragon to the afterlife. Ang and Ling Leung, seventeen-year-old fraternal twins born in the year of the Dragon, are next in line for the Golden Dragon power band to defend the mortal world from evil. Ang does not believe he will become the Golden Dragon, as Ling is the best fighter at the Dragon Dojo. Ling is positive that she will become the Golden Dragon. However, when Master Chin Ho calls upon the power of the Golden Dragon to choose who will be the next Golden Dragon, it chooses Ang. Humiliated and furious, Ling storms out of the temple and is tempted by the dark and evil power of the Shadow Dragon. From then on, Ang is forced to fight his twin sister.

In the series 1 finale "Double Double", Ling is overtaken by an even greater shadow magic via the revived Emperor of the Darkest Yin, who orders her to win the mystical powerband of the Golden Dragon. However, Master Chin reveals to Ling that the only way for her to rightfully claim the powerband is to kill Ang. Horrified, Ling breaks free of the darkness that has overwhelmed her for so long, as she cannot kill her twin. Impressed, Chin reveals that it was all a test for Ling, allowing her to follow her true path. He explains, as Ang's twin sister, she can now become a Golden Dragon as well. Chin merging both the positive and negative energies of the Golden Dragon powerband and the Shadow Dragon band bestows even greater dragon firepower onto Ang and Ling as twin Golden Dragons; and are now twice as strong when they work together as one.

The second series begins with the reformed Ling back home as one of the Golden Dragons alongside her brother. Now they, Chin, and the fellow guardians of the Tiger and Monkey temples are ready to put an end to the Zodiac Master and the Emperor of the Darkest Yin. However, the Emperor is on the move to regroup at the Temple of the Shadow Dragon, but not before he attacks and disintegrates the Temple of the Golden Dragons, leaving Ang and Ling's powerbands on the verge of powerlessness permanently. Luckily, Chin suggests going to long-lost Temple of the Shadow Dragon and utilize its vast amounts of negative energy to re-energize their power bands fully.

As Ling was exposed to the evil energies of the Shadow Dragon for quite some time, she became easily tempted by the temple's negative influence on both her mind and spirit. However, with the wisdom of Master Chin, she and Ang successfully recharge their power bands with no negative effects. Elsewhere, the Emperor releases his younger sister Yin Wi, the Guardian of the Shadow Rat, who had been imprisoned by a previous Golden Dragon for a thousand years. The two siblings concoct plans to conquer the modern world and have their vengeance on all twelve guardians of yang; specifically the Golden Dragon. As they head to the Temple of the Shadow Wolf, the heroes encounter K-Lo, the Shadow Wolf Guardian (one of Ling's allies during her dark times as the Shadow Dragon and who seems to have now taken a romantic interest in her).

Ultimately, the Emperor of the Darkest Yin and Me Yin succeed in finding the ancient Heart of the Black Dragon which greatly amplifies their strength tenfold. As a last resort to save all of humanity, Ang and Ling activate the dormant mystical Heart of the Golden Dragon within themselves and turn into a two-headed red-and-yellow dragon. However, the Emperor and Yin Wi escape with the great mystical powers of the Heart of the Black Dragon at their disposal.

== Characters ==
=== Main characters ===
- Ang Leung (voiced by Alan Marriott) is seventeen years old, and is highly accomplished in martial arts and knows of the ancient philosophies of the Golden Dragon, along with his twin sister, Ling. His Powerband is gold with an orange/gold gemstone which makes him muscular, lets him shoot orange/gold fire blasts and fly. Ang is emotionally torn once he finds out that Ling has joined the Zodiac Master and become the Shadow Dragon. Throughout the first season, Ang repeatedly tries to bring Ling back to the light of yang, but Ling, although she does occasionally help him out, is still persistent on claiming his Powerband. Ang still strongly cares about her, even if she is working for Zodiac Master. In Season 2, Ling becomes the second Golden Dragon alongside his sister. With new abilities, they can fly, teleport, as well as become an actual dragon. Ang's best friends are Xuan Chi, Guardian of the Temple of the Monkeys, as well as Beingal, Guardian of the Temple of the Tigers. Ang likes computer games and music; in fact, he devotes much of his spare time to these activities.
- Ling Leung (voiced by Larissa Murray) is seventeen years old. Like her brother Ang, she is highly accomplished in martial arts and knowledgeable of the ancient philosophies of the Golden Dragon. Ling has always thought that, since she was the better fighter, she would be the next Golden Dragon. When Ang is selected, she is left filled with hatred, anger and humiliation. After leaving the Dragon Dojo, Ling is approached by the Zodiac Master, who asks her to join him with the promise that he will make her a dragon. Agreeing, she becomes the Shadow Dragon. Ling still cares about her twin brother, even though they are now enemies by her choice. Her allegiance to the Zodiac Master often wavers based on personal or family issues. Most of the time, she fights for him, but there are occasions when she helps Ang and his friends. To power-up, Ling must say, "Empower the Shadow Dragon". Her Powerband is a dark-blue/gold. Later in the series, she also becomes a Golden Dragon and returns to the good side; giving her an identical band to Ang's. In the series finale, "The Heart of the Dragon," the twins can use their Golden Dragon powers to turn into a two-headed dragon. Ling's only romantic interest seems to be K-ho.
- Beingal (voiced by Lucy Porter (first series), and Elly Fairman (second season)) is the tough, barefoot Guardian of the Temple of the Tiger. She's Ang and Ling's childhood friend and became a Temple Guardian not long before Ang was chosen to be the Golden Dragon. She has romantic feelings for Ang, becoming angry and jealous when another girl takes interest in him. She is seen to be attractive by the other temple guardians, but Ang does not seem to notice her in this way. Throughout the series, subtle hints that something is going to happen between her and Ang are given away. To power-up, Beingal must say, "Empower the tiger". Her Powerband is green with a red/orange gemstone, giving her tiger stripes, allowing her to fire her tiger claws at enemies, and also shoot green power blasts.
- Xuan Chi (voiced by Marc Silk) is the barefoot Guardian of the Temple of the Monkey. He is the only Temple Guardian that does not wear his Powerband, mainly because temple raiders infiltrated his temple and supposedly took his band when they kidnapped him. Later on, he returns to his temple to discover his Powerband was always there. The temple raiders came back to take it, but they lost it and Xuan has since been on a wild goose chase for it, eventually managing to get it back from the Zodiac Master. During the two-part episode "The Temple of the Shadow Dragon" the Emperor of the Darkest Yin and the Zodiac Master attempt to destroy the Dragon Temple. When a power blast from the Emperor and the twin Golden Dragons hit Xuan Chi, the power from these blasts was enough to turn him into a monkey. His powerband is white with a light green gemstone that provides him with heightened agility. Xuan loves bananas and often acts like a monkey. He is sometimes seen by others as rude and stupid, but he has been Ang's best friend since they met. His role in the series is mostly comedic relief.
- Master Chin Ho (voiced by Dan Russell) used to be the Guardian of the Temple of the Pig. He now runs a dojo/school for younger people to be hopeful future Guardians, such as Ling, Ang and Beingal. He taught Ang and Ling as their personal mentor. He is a skilled fighter and often uses old proverbs to teach Ang and his friends. He teaches Ang how to be the Golden Dragon and how to improve his skills. He is always ready for every attack. Ironically, he taught Zodiac Master before he became evil.
- The Zodiac Master (voiced by Dan Russell) is the main antagonist in series one. In the second series, he is demoted to being the secondary antagonist, with his master the Emperor of the Darkest Yin, taking his place. The Zodiac Master's real name is Woo Yin and he was born in the year of the Snake, assuming he was going to be the Snake Guardian. Ultimately, the Snake Powerband selected someone different, thus he chose the powers of the Darkest Yin as a result. His goal is to obtain all the Powerbands of the Chinese Zodiac, rendering him invincible. He has a pet snake named King Cobra and uses it to spy or assist him during fights. Despite supposedly being very powerful, he is often easily defeated, even in situations in which he has the clear advantage (such as having three Powerbands, compared to Ang only having one).
- The Emperor of the Darkest Yin (voiced by Gary Martin) is the main antagonist from episodes 26-39. He was the previous Shadow Dragon prior to Ling before being locked up. He also has a younger sister – Yin Wi, the shapeshifting Shadow Rat Guardian.
- Lo Wang is the Guardian of the Temple of the Rooster, an excellent strategist. His appearance and voice are based upon a young Sean Connery. His Powerband is white with a purple/blue gemstone and provides him with armor that resembles a rooster. His character is considered to pay homage to James Bond.
- Chow (voiced by Dan Russell) is the Guardian of the Temple of the Dog. His Powerband is gold with a purple/blue gemstone and gives him more body hair, longer claws and longer teeth.
- Shoong is the Guardian of the Temple of the Pig. His Powerband is black with a light purple gemstone; making him more muscular and gives him armor. In one episode, Shoong appears to be Ang and Xuan Chi's Master.

=== Supporting ===
- Ming (voiced by Lucy Porter) is the Guardian of the Temple of the Rat. Her Powerband is black with a deep pink gemstone, giving her a long plait, resembling a rat tail and long metal claws and armor. The Rat Powerband allows Ming to change into whoever she wishes. However, her transformations are not perfect, as there is always something that differs from who she is trying to mimic (such as when she turned into a snake the gem was seen on the back of her neck, as well as when she transformed into Ang, she still retained her ponytail). Her counterpart is the Shadow Rat, who happens to be the Yin Emperor's younger sister.
- Robbie is the Guardian of the Temple of the Ox. An eight-year-old boy, but when he empowers the Ox, he turns into an older man. His Powerband is gold with an orange/pink gemstone and gives him armor with an Ox-horned helmet.
- Billy is the current Guardian of the Temple of the Ram. His Powerband is gold with a turquoise gemstone and makes him look half-ram, half-human with curly ram horns and rock-like skin, he is also able to create small earthquakes. Like all twelve Guardians, he has a natural spiritual connection with past Ram Guardians; such as Ang and Ling's (supposedly) late mother, Mae-Ying.
- Cobra (voiced by Larissa Murray) is the Guardian of the Temple of the Snake. Her Powerband is red with a bright-yellow gemstone giving her green, snake-like skin, as well as venom and a very elasticated body.
- Hye is the Guardian of the Temple of the Rabbit. Seeing as she cannot afford to allow herself strong emotions, she cannot quite feel anything much for Ang, but tells Beingal that she is Ang's comrade-in-arms, as well as that she can not ever be replaced. Her Powerband is green coloured with an orange gemstone but she is never seen empowered. Her first appearance is in the episode "Sister Sister".
- Mana-Ho is the Guardian of the Temple of the Horse. A tall, blonde hair woman whose laugh is reminiscent of a horse's whinny. Her powerband is red with a blue gemstone.
- K-Ho (voiced by Alan Marriott) is the guardian of the Temple of the Shadow Wolf. Ling seems to be head over heels for the young man, but Ang, seems to dislike this "lone wolf". K-Ho shows some signs that he likes Ling but does not let it interfere with his concentration. He is, unlike most of the Shadow Guardians able to care about the universal balance, not taking over the world. In the later episodes K-Ho teaches Ang and Ling skills to be better dragons, teleportation in particular. His powerband is very similar to the old Shadow Dragon band before it was turned into a Golden Dragon band. To power up, K-Ho says "Empower the Shadow Wolf".
- Yin Wi (voiced by Elly Fairman) is the Guardian of the Temple of the Shadow Rat and the Emperor's younger sister. She had been imprisoned for thousands of years by an unnamed Golden Dragon of the distant past.
- Victor (voiced by Marc Silk (human-form) and Dan Russell (as Shadow Ox)) is the guardian of the Temple of the Shadow Ox. Like the Light Ox guardian he is also a child.
- Chang Wo is the guardian of the Temple of the Shadow Ape.
- Sabre-Claw is guardian of the Temple of the Shadow Tiger. He is rather cocky but, loyal towards the Emperor of the Darkest Yin. He is convinced that the power of the tiger is the strongest force to come about. He will stop at nothing to obtain Beingal's powerband to unite the power of the Tiger, thus doubling his own.
- The Jaguar God is an ancient Mayan god, possibly Bahlam, worshipped by Mayan kings and their subjects, further hinted to with his mortal/human form resembling a long dead Mayan king, who strongly believed in jaguars. His first form is a powerful black/dark greyish-blue jaguar with no spots, slightly resembling the jaguar statue he was summoned/brought back to life from using the Shadow Tiger powerband, with black outlined yellow eyes. His second form is a black/dark grey were-jaguar with black spots on the sides of its torso and no tail. He appears in the episode, "Spellbound", as well as falls in love with Beingal, hypnotizing her so that she becomes his queen consort.
- Tex: He is the evil counterpart of the guardian of the Horse, and is therefore guardian of the Shadow Stallion Temple. It is not known if Tex is his real name or just an insulting nickname Yin Wi gave him. Similar to K-Ho, he does not want to join forces with the Emperor of the Darkest Yin or Yin Wi, seeming to care more about universal order and concord.
- Mae-Ying: Ang and Ling's mother, and the loving wife of the previous Golden Dragon, whose first and last appearance is in episode 24 Lost and Found. In her younger years, she was the Guardian of the Ram, where she frequently fought alongside the Golden Dragon against the Zodiac Master. After her marriage to the previous Golden Dragon, and giving birth to Ang and Ling, she chose to step down as Guardian of the Ram to carry out her duties as wife and mother. She was attacked by the Zodiac Master and survived, but forever lost all memory of her husband and children. Master Chin had then hid her away in a far-away land, where she has been caring for infant goats over the past seventeen years. Although she does not recall her earlier life as the guardian of the Ram Temple, the mystical Powerband still recognizes her as its previous wearer and shielded her from the Zodiac Master's evil magic.
- Mr. Leung was the previous guardian of the Golden Dragon Temple, and defender of the World from the Zodiac Master and any other adversaries, whom his own son has now succeeded. He eventually befriended and, as time went on, fell in love with the guardian of the Ram Temple, Mae-Ying. As his children began training with Chin, he showed deep concern for their lives, knowing that his enemies would try to use the young Ang and Ling to get to him. Therefore, he made Chin magically erase all recollection of him from his children. In The Last Dragon he appeared before his son in a vision, telling him to "watch, listen and learn". The hard truth about his actions are revealed in flashbacks between Ang and Ling when they finally regain their childhood memories of their late father. His first-name remains unknown.

== Production ==
On 6 October 2001, BKN International announced the show's production as a co-production with Hong Kong-based studio Animation Enterprises.

On 17 March 2005, BKN pre-sold the series in Germany to Super RTL. Originally, the series was going to have 52 episodes produced, but this was reduced down to 36.

On 22 June 2005, BKN signed a publishing deal with The Game Factory and DeAgostini to produce multimedia based on the show.

Jeff "Swampy" Marsh was the supervising art director, and would go on to be co-creator of major children's television shows such as Phineas and Ferb

== Broadcast ==
The series originally premiered in Latin America on Nickelodeon and eventually made its British premiere on CBBC in July 2005.

The series premiered in the US on Toon Disney's Jetix block in October 2006. Subsequently, the two-part premiere, "Trial by Fire" was shown as a Jetix Blockbuster on ABC Family in August before all Jetix programming moved to Toon Disney. The series continued to air reruns until 2009.

The last thirteen episodes of the show aired in Australia on Network Ten's Toasted TV from 19 March 2008 and ended in 2012.

== Episode list ==
=== Season One ===
No.	Title	Written by	Original release date
101	"Trial by Fire, Part One"	Sean Catherine Derek	6 August 2006
The latest Golden Dragon has died, and a new one must be chosen to take down the Zodiac Master and defend all of humanity.
102	"Trial by Fire, Part Two"	Sean Catherine Derek	14 August 2006
Ang is the new Golden Dragon and must fight the new Shadow Dragon.
103	"Eye on the Tiger"	Sean Catherine Derek	4 October 2006
The Zodiac Master and the new Shadow Dragon, Ling, go after Beingal for the mystical Powerband of the Tigers. It becomes a matter of time for Ang to get to the Tiger Temple to stop them destroying the Temple itself and to keep the band safe. When Ling defeats Beingal, she yells "no" and jumps down and catches Beingal, the Zodiac Master says she is weak and that she saved her because she was once her friend, but she says it is because they need Beingal to lure the Golden Dragon to the Tiger Temple.
104	"Hero Worship"	Len Uhley	5 October 2006
After the Zodiac Master's defeat, he targets Ang's number one actor. Ang must now protect his number one stubborn actor at the Dragon Dojo, while not trying to let Master Chin know.
105	"Terra Unfirma"	Eric Lewald and Julia Lewald	6 October 2006
The Zodiac Master goes after the Earth Signs, which include Dog, Ram, Ox and Dragon. The Shadow Dragon (Ling) attacks the Dog temple and manages to get the Dog Power Band and the Zodiac Master gets the Ram Power Band. They both go after the Ox as their next target, thus Ang must stop them, but the question is, can the Zodiac Master really control all that power he is using?
106	"Master of Sarcasm"	Mike Edens	9 October 2006
Ang and Xuan Chi travel to Vietnam to a guy named Shoong, who is a master of sarcasm and is seen by Ang and Xuan Chi as bossy until it is revealed that he is the Guardian of the Temple of the Pigs.
107	"Temple of Changes"	Sean Roche	10 October 2006
Ang has a rough time as he goes through a series of tests, which every Golden Dragon must take like entering the Temple of Changes.
108	"Mindbender"	Sean Roche	11 October 2006
During a fight with Ling in the Dragon Temple, Ang loses his memory after getting struck by falling rocks from the ceiling. She convinces him that he works with a man called the Zodiac Master.
109	"Chow Chow"	Richard Mueller	12 October 2006
Ling is in trouble after the Emperor gives her power but tries to pull her into his tomb. When Ling arranges to meet Ang to ask for his help, the Zodiac Master reads her email and turns up, making Ang believe it is all an act. Ang has hidden his band somewhere and the Zodiac Master threatens to destroy Ling if he does not give up the band. Ang gives in and when they go to the hiding place, the band is not there. Meanwhile, the other temple guardians have turned up at the holy Temple of the Golden Dragon to honor the new Dragon but they find he is not there. So Chow, the Dog Guardian, as well as Xuan Chi go looking for Ang, when Xuan Chi finds the Dragon band.
110	"Monkey Mission"	Bob Forward	13 October 2006
Xuan Chi senses that the Monkey Powerband may have not been taken by the Temple Raiders. He goes back to his temple to go and find out, but so does the Zodiac Master.
111	"The Emperor of the Darkest Yin"	Mike Edens	16 October 2006
Ang encounters a fierce but incompetent fighter who calls himself 'the Master of Red Chi'. After defeating and embarrassing him, he takes him back to the Dragon Dojo, where the Red Chi Master alleges he wants revenge on the Zodiac Master for leaving him. Master Chin gives Ang an important message "When you try to use the force of evil, it is the evil that ends up using you"
112	"The Last Dragon"	Greg Johnson	17 October 2006
Ang and Ling discover that the last Golden Dragon was their own father. They discover this during a special time of year where all twelve guardians meditate while their Powerbands recharge to full strength and mystic energy. The Zodiac Master sees this as an opportunity to strike. Ling and Ang work together and they hug. Ang thinks Ling will come back, but she chooses differently.
113	"Spy Hard"	Simon Furman	18 October 2006
Ang travels off to the Rooster Temple to take care of trouble after the warning rose in the Dragon Temple. But it is a trap as the Zodiac Master brings a sorceress to corrupt the Dragon Temple spirit.
114	"Sister, Sister"	Len Uhley	19 October 2006
The Shadow Dragon takes the Rabbit Power Band, but it is damaged and has created four copies of Ling, each with their own personality, causing trouble for Ang and even the Zodiac Master. It is seen that Ang seems to have a bit of a crush on the Rabbit Guardian, Hye.
115	"Associating With Vermin"	Katheryn Lawrence	20 October 2006
Ang is lured into Ling's traps again, this time tricking Ang to think the Guardian of the Temple of the Rats (Ming) is Ling in disguise.
116	"Shell Game"	Christopher Yost	23 October 2006
Xuan Chi's Monkey Powerband has been found by Ang, but he is unable to take it because it is on display at the museum. But Zodiac Master has other ideas. As he is about to take it, he spots a suit of armor that the emperor of the darkest Yin wore in fights and brings the suit to life. He gives the Monkey band to him and chaos ensures, as Xuan Chi is mad on getting his band back.
117	"Thief of Power"	Sean Roche	24 October 2006
An ex-guardian escapes from jail, with the help of Master Chin and Shoong (Guardian of the Pig). Meanwhile, back at the Dragon Dojo, the escaped convict who identifies himself as Tommy Vu wants Master Chin, but gets nowhere and leaves. Ang, Beingal and Xuan Chi travel to Vietnam to find some answers.
118	"Horse Play"	Christy Marx and Randy Littlejohn	25 October 2006
The Guardian of the Temple of the Horse is in danger, but Ang has to find the Temple first. What sort of test faces him? The Horse band is seen in this episode. But it is not seen as being empowered.
119	"It's Always Darkest Before Xuan"	Len Uhley	26 October 2006
Xuan Chi is now starting to get tired of the one who does not have a Powerband and is useless. It does not help when the former Monkey Guardian arrives and criticize him how he disgraced the name of Monkey. He begins to sink so low that he travels back to his own temple and finds the Shadow Monkey Powerband and wears it.
120	"Venom"	Sean Catherine Derek	27 October 2006
The Snake Guardian is in mortal danger as the Zodiac Master's pet King Cobra has bitten her and taken the Snake Powerband himself. Soon Ang must face him when he gets Beingal's Powerband of the Tigers, but using his own band and the Shadow Dragon Band borrowed by Ling.
121	"Empower the Darkest Ling"	Sean Catherine Derek	28 October 2006
When the Emperor of the Darkest Yin possess the Zodiac Master, they also possess Ling, who is then turned into a green shadow Dragon. She goes off to find four Powerbands and present them to the Emperor of the Darkest Yin to life.
122	"Hair of the Dog"	Sean Roche	31 October 2006
A mad scientist turns himself into a big Dog, prompting the Dog Guardian to stop him and is defeated. Ling joins forces with Ang in order to protect the Dog Guardian's pet Dog from harm, as well as to go and find and defeat the mad scientist.
123	"X-Games Guardians"	Sean Roche	1 November 2006
A street urchin girl steals the Ram Powerband from the Zodiac Master, leaving the Shadow Dragon (Ling) to get the band from her and Ang, Beingal and Xuan Chi then join in pursuit of the mystical powerband.
124	"Lost and Found"	Len Uhley	2 November 2006
The Zodiac Master goes after the Ram Powerband again and manages to take it, along with the Snake Powerband. However, when Ling touches it, she has a vision of her long-lost mother of being the Ram Guardian and asks Ang to help her find information about her. Soon they found out she was the Ram Guardian and had frequently worked alongside their father, the previous Golden Dragon, against the Zodiac Master. In time, they fell for one another, married, and had fraternal twins Ang and Ling. However, one day, Zodiac Master attacked her. She survived the attack, but lost all her memory of who she was and of her new family. They both set off to see their mother at the Ram Temple, but not without the Zodiac Master interfering.
125	"Monkey See, Monkey Do"	Christy Marx and Randy Littlejohn	3 November 2006
It is Xuan Chi's birthday and his present is the Monkey Powerband, but it is found on a ship tanker. But the Zodiac Master gets the band first. Will Xuan Chi get his Powerband back or lose it again?
126	"Double Dragon"	Sean Roche	6 November 2006
The Emperor of the Darkest Yin has returned to life thanks to the efforts of Ling and the Zodiac Master. The Emperor's very first act is to find and annihilate the new Golden Dragon. He empowers Ling with his stronger shadow powers, which further warps both her mind and spirit. As Ang recovers from an earlier fight, the warped Ling emerges and attacks him. He expresses his shock by the sudden change he detects in her. With her shadow band's dark magic in conjunction with the greater ones of the resurrected Emperor of the Darkest Yin, Ling easily overwhelms Ang and knocks him unconscious. She commands that he forfeit the Golden Dragon's light band, as she has beaten him. Chin, however, informs her that the only way for her to fully claim the Golden Dragon's mystical powers is to destroy him. Horrified at such a choice, Ling is released from the great power of the Darkest Yin and tosses her Shadow Dragon band in tears.

=== Season Two ===
The Temple of the Shadow Dragon, Part One

Production Number: 201

Air date: 19 March 2008 (Australia)

Written by: Sean Catherine Derek

The Emperor destroys the Temple of the Golden Dragon, forcing Ang and Ling to look for the Shadow Dragon Temple.

The Temple of the Shadow Dragon, Part Two

Production Number: 202

Air date: 20 March 2008 (Australia)

Written by: Sean Catherine Derek

Ang and Ling to travel to the Shadow Dragon Temple, to recharge their bands with Dark Yin Energy. Master Chin turns the Shadow Dragon Temple into the Double Golden Dragon Temple.

Enter the Wolf

Production Number: 203

Airdate: 21 March 2008 (Australia)

Written by: Rick Ungar

Ang and Ling encounter K-Ho, the Guardian of the Temple of the Shadow Wolf.

Cats and Dogs and Dragons

Production Number: 204

Written by: Mark Seidenberg

Our heroes set out to search for Dr. Beverly Wallis, an archaeologist friend of Master Chin's, who went missing.

Shadow Tiger Take Two

Production Number: 205

Written by: Glenn Leopold

Our heroes test Ling's latest amphibious super craft and play tourists where Wang Lee and his famous new co-star Karin Kwan are making an action packed movie.

A Horse of a Different Color

Production Number: 206

Written by: Michael Edens

Our heroes set out to White Horse in England to see if the Shadow Horse temple is indeed hidden below the famous cliffs.

Rat Attack

Production Number: 207

Written by: Len Uhley

Yin Wi's repeatedly failed attempts to steal the twin power-bands of the Golden Dragons' have left everyone drained of nearly all of their mental and spiritual energies, Ang's in particular.

Spellbound

Production Number: 208

Written by: Christy Marx and Randy Littlejohn

Yin Wi concocts a plan to show her older brother, the Emperor of the Darkest Yin, what she can do to further develop his dark powers, as well as increase them to tremendous levels.

Friend or Foe?

Production Number: 209

Written by: Dennis Haley and Marcy Brown

Yin Wi is captured by Ang and Ling's combined Dragon mystical Dragon powers. As such, she forfeits her dark powerband.

The Golden Baby-Sitter Blues

Production Number: 210

Written by: Mark Seidenberg

After Sabre-Claw runs the Ox Guardian out of the Temple of the Ox, the eight-year-old boy seeks refuge at Master Chin's dojo.

Gone Shadow Ape

Production Number: 211

Written by: Sean Catherine Derek

Ang and Master Chin are off in Hong Kong following a lead on the missing Monkey Power Band, while Ling and Beingal keep an eye on the Dragon Temple in San Francisco.

It's A Dog-Eat-Wolf World

Production Number: 212

Written by: Mark Seidenberg

Along with Ang, K-Ho goes to the wintry region and learns that a trio of ruthless men in a chopper are harassing the wolves for pleasure and for profit.

The Heart of the Black Dragon

Production Number: 213

Written by: Christy Marx and Randy Littlejohn

The Emperor and Yin Wi discover the location of a supremely powerful mystical artifact known as "the Heart of the Black Dragon" which greatly amplifies the strength of Shadow Dragons tenfold. However, Ang and Ling are in search of the mystical Heart of the Golden Dragon itself. With it, Ang and Ling succeed in stopping the Emperor and Yin Wi, who escape with the ancient dark powers of the Heart of the Black Dragon still at their disposal. Able the access the mystical powers of the Heart of the Golden Dragon from deep within them freely, Ang and Ling are ready for anything.

- The show was cancelled after this cliffhanger.

== Home media ==
=== United Kingdom ===
BKN Home Entertainment released a two-disc set containing the first 13 episodes of season 1 on 23 October 2006. A second two-disc set, containing the other 13 episodes of season 1, was supposed to be released but was cancelled after BKN Home Entertainment UK ceased operations.

=== United States ===
From 2006 to 2007, Genius Entertainment released four DVD volumes that made up a portion of season 1. The first volume was released on 31 October 2006, and contains four episodes. The second and third volumes were released on 30 January 2007, containing five episodes each. The Fourth volume was released on 22 May 2007, and contained 6 episodes. On the same day, a box set was released containing the entirety of series 1, including an exclusive fifth volume of six episodes. This box set has been known for a factory manufacturing error where the sound in the episode "Hair of the Dog" cuts out after the first minute of the episode.

Image Entertainment later released all 39 episodes in a single release boxset on 1 December 2009.

=== Other ===
The complete series was released on DVD in separate volumes in Bulgaria. Each season (13 episodes) consisted of five two-episode DVDs and one with three episodes.

== Media tie-ins ==
In 2004, World Comics released a comic book tie-in to the series.

A Legend of the Dragon video game was released on 1 May 2007 for the Wii, PlayStation 2 and PlayStation Portable.
