= Dork Hunters from Outer Space =

2008 British-German animated TV series

- Also known as: Dork - Jäger aus dem All
- Genre: Comedy; Action
- Created by: Rick Ungar
- Written by: Rick Ungar; Sean Catherine Derek
- Directed by: Stuart Evans (season 1); Barry Baker (season 2); Chris Evans (season 2)
- Voices of: Gary Martin; Lili Katz; Alan Marriott; Eric Meyers; Ben Small; Lynn Blade; Dian Perry
- Composer: Allen Bohbot
- Countries of origin: United Kingdom; Germany
- Original languages: English; German
- No. of seasons: 2
- No. of episodes: 36

Production
- Executive producers: Rick Ungar; Allen Bohbot
- Producer: Stuart Evans
- Running time: 22 minutes
- Production companies: BKN International; BKN New Media

Original release
- Network: ITV/GMTV (United Kingdom); RTL II (Germany)
- Release: 17 August 2008 – 19 April 2009

Dork Hunters from Outer Space (German: Dork - Jäger aus dem All) is an animated television series produced by the German company BKN International and British subsidiary BKN New Media. The series was created by Rick Ungar. It first aired on RTL II in Germany and on GMTV in the United Kingdom.

The show is about a group of five teenagers (two humans and three aliens) who try to stop a group of villains called the Dorks. The team take their orders from a goldfish named Sidney.

The show received high ratings on GMTV, ranking as the channel's second most-popular show among children aged 4–9 for the year of 2008.

== Plot ==
The series centres on five teenagers named Mac, Eddie, Nikki, Angie and Romeo. Eddie and Angie are siblings who attend a high school in Paramus, New Jersey, while Mac, Nikki, and Romeo are extraterrestrials who accidentally landed on earth after taking a wrong turn at Saturn.

Due to their powers, they can detect the nasty smells of "Dorks", aliens with the power to disguise themselves as humans and cause trouble, summoned by a dog-resembling alien named Fido, the loyal pet of Principal Jones.

== Characters ==
=== Protagonists ===
- Eddie (voiced by Eric Meyers), one of the two humans on the Dork Hunters team. He is Angie's twin brother and is very clever. He is 14 years old.
- Angie (voiced by Lili Katz), a human girl and the fashionista of the team who loves clothes and make-up. She is 14 years old.
- Mac (voiced by Alan Marriott), an alien with a long tongue. He is 16 years old.
- Nicki (voiced by Lynn Blade), an alien who can shoot lasers from her fingers. She is 16 years old.
- Romeo (voiced by Ben Small), an alien with a skateboard that can shoot laser beams. He is 16 years old.
- Chief Sidney a talking goldfish who is the leader of the Dork Hunters. He lives in a little aquarium.

=== Antagonists ===
- Fido (voiced by Gary Martin), the Chihuahua-disguised leader of the Dorks who is the show's main antagonist.
- Principal Jones (voiced by Dian Perry), the principal of the High School and the owner of Fido.

== Episodes ==
=== Season 1 ===
No.	Title	Written by	Original release date	Prod. code
1.01	"The Ref"	Rick Ungar; Sean Derek	26 March 2008 (Germany); 17 August 2008 (United Kingdom)	101
During a Basketball game. The Dork Hunters wonder if the referee is a Dork, following the familiar smell going all around the court.
1.02	"Field Trip"	Rick Ungar; Sean Derek	24 August 2008	102
The Dork Hunters go on a field trip to the museum, but they must battle against some Dorks who are protecting a Microgalaxy in the building.
1.03	"Tunnel Vision"	Rick Ungar; David Mowers	31 August 2008	103
Dorks have hidden a Microgalaxy down in the sewers, it's up to the Dork Hunters to get onto a mission that may smell as worse as the Dorks.
1.04	"Big Top"	Rick Ungar; Mark Steen	7 September 2008	104
A Microgalaxy is discovered in the Circus, but Eddie is afraid of clowns! Can the Dork Hunters find a way to overcome Eddie's fear?
1.05	"Flea Market"	Hugh Palmer	14 September 2008	105
Angie buys a Lava Lamp that she isn't fond of, and sells it. The only problem is that it contains a Microgalaxy!
1.06	"Dog Gone"	Mark Seidenberg	21 September 2008	106
When Fido accidentally eats a Microgalaxy, the whole world is at risk.
1.07	"Fast Food Friends"	Glenn Leopold	28 September 2008	107
Eddie and Angie are faced against clones of each other.
1.08	"Zero to Hero"	Sean Roche	5 October 2008	108
Eddie and Angie team up with a famous sci-fi actor to retrieve a Microgalaxy hidden in one of his awards.
1.09	"The Dorkinator"	Len Uhley	12 October 2008	109
A Dork from earth is sent to destroy the Dork Hunters, and he's tough.
1.10	"Toy Soldiers"	Dennis Haley; Marcy Brown	19 October 2008	110
Wacky Waldo's prototype toys keeps causing the Dork Hunters' alarms to activate.
1.11	"The Falcon"	Rick Ungar	26 October 2008	111
Skateborder Bonnie Falcon is visiting the city, and Romeo is excited, but Mac is suspicious about his true powers.
1.12	"Finding Sidney"	Christy Marx; Randy Littlejohn	2 November 2008	112
On a mission to try and find the Dork Commander Headquarters, the Dorks kidnap Sidney.
1.13	"Romeo and Julia"	Mark Seidenberg	9 November 2008	113
The Dork Hunters get suspicious when Romeo starts hanging out with a new neighbour.
1.14	"3rd Rock Star"	Dennis Haley; Marcy Brown	16 November 2008	114
Could famous singer Lacy Lavender and his band be Dorks? Her biggest fans Nikki and Angie are here to find out.
1.15	"Fish Out of Water"	Len Uhley	23 November 2008	115
Dorks attempt to take over the Dork Hunters base to take down Sidney and stop the Dork Hunters from stopping them.
1.16	"Dr. Dorkenstein"	Mark Seidenberg	30 November 2008	116
Fido creates a robot Dork to keep the Dork Hunters in order.
1.17	"Wild Dorkingdom"	Glenn Leopold	7 December 2008	117
It's Sidney's birthday, and the Dork Hunters take him to a fancy hotel. Little as they know, Principal Jones and Fido are there as well.
1.18	"Dorks in Black"	Steven Darancette	14 December 2008	118
Principal Jones is the one who needs saving when the Dork Hunters are asked to retrieve a Microgalaxy in Area 51.
1.19	"Loser Island"	Sean Roche	21 December 2008	119
The Dork Hunters discover a Microgalaxy on the set of a reality show, and begin to suspect if the host is a Dork.
1.20	"Debbie, We Hardly Know Ye..."	Len Uhley	28 December 2008	120
Fido hynotises one of the Dork Hunters' classmates into trusting and then destroying them.
1.21	"Principal Jones' Day Off"	Sean Roche	4 January 2009	121
The Dork Hunters plot a scheme to stop the Microgalaxy delivery system from reaching Fido and Principal Jones.
1.22	"Break Up"	Rick Ungar	11 January 2009	122
Mac, Nikki and Romeo are informed that they are going to be transferred over to a new Galaxy. Eddie and Angie must train some new teammates to become their new assistants.
1.23	"Dog Days of Disco"	Steven Darancette	18 January 2009	123
Fido tells Principal Jones the story about how the first Microgalaxy made it to space and how the Dorks used Earth as their new home.
1.24	"Jean Splicing"	Glenn Leopold	25 January 2009	124
Angie loves fashion and shopping, and Fido decides to use this to his advantage to trap her.
1.25	"Dorks of Hazzard"	Glenn Leopold	1 February 2009	125
Eddie and Romeo are pitted against a Dork whose monster truck has a Microgalaxy inside.
1.26	"Mind Wavy Gravy"	Sean Roche	8 February 2009	126
Fido creates a gravy that can make the Dork Hunters forget who they are.

=== Season 2 ===
No.	Title	Written by	Original release date	Prod. code
2.01	"Dorkzilla"	Glenn Leopold	15 February 2009	201
Fido plots a scheme to trap the Dork Hunters inside a Microgalaxy by shrinking them down to size.
2.02	"Private School"	Steven Darancette	22 February 2009	202
Eddie and Angie are transferred over to a private school. However, they soon discover that it is infested with Dorks.
2.03	"Scavenger Hunt"	Sean Catherine Derek	1 March 2009	203
Fido and Principal Jones must rely on the Dork Hunters' help when a bee gives Fido a life-threatening sting.
2.04	"Bone of Contention"	Len Uhley	8 March 2009	204
Fido loses his communication bone and the earth is at jeopardy.
2.05	"Sushi Sidney"	Sean Catherine Derek	15 March 2009	205
After losing a Microgalaxy to the Dorks, the Dork Hunters are supervised by an observer, bringing more problems than ever.
2.06	"Summer Vacation, Part 1"	Rick Ungar	22 March 2009	206
The Dork Hunters go on summer vacation to Tortuga Island, but are unaware that they are about to be the victims of a plot involving pirates, Fido, Principal Jones and a Microgalaxy!
2.07	"Summer Vacation, Part 2"	Sean Catherine Derek	29 March 2009	207
2.08	"Summer Vacation, Part 3"	Sean Catherine Derek	5 April 2009	208
2.09	"The D Files"	Steven Darancette	12 April 2009	209
Fido and Principal Jones trick an innocent mailman into revealing the Dork Hunters' secret whereabouts.
2.10	"The Final Episode... Or Not?"	Len Uhley	19 April 2009	210
The Dork Hunters, Fido and Principal Jones realize that "Dork Hunters" series was nothing more than a reality show and that they were all actors. The producers negotiate with them all to bring the series back.

== Production ==
The show was first announced under the title Triple Threat from Outer Space in 2005. It was given a budget of US$6.5 million and was scheduled to air by September 2006. At this stage, the concept was slightly different, and it was about three alien girls named Star, Mac, and Nicki posing as humans. For the final show, Star's name was changed to Romeo, Mac was changed to a boy, and human twins Eddie and Angie were added to the team. The series' new title and characters were confirmed in an Animation Magazine article in December 2005.

BKN International, a German studio, produced the show after setting up a subsidiary in London called BKN New Media Ltd. Originally, 26 episodes were planned, but was increased to 36 by February 2007. Jeff "Swampy" Marsh was the director of production. Sean Catherine Derek, known for her work on Batman: The Animated Series, was the co-developer of the show (alongside creator Rick Ungar). Dreamforest Animation in the Philippines handled the series' animation.

=== Broadcast ===
In February 2007, GMTV in the United Kingdom and RTL II in Germany was announced as the initial broadcasters for the series. The series was originally planned to premiere on RTL II first in Late-2007, but instead premiered on 26 March 2008, airing every weekday.

In April 2008, Network Ten in Australia, SABC in South Africa and CTC in Russia had acquired the broadcast rights in their respective countries.

In January 2009, Jetix acquired pay-TV rights for the show in the United Kingdom.

In Spain, the series aired on Clan TVE.

== Film ==
A feature film based on the show, titled Dork Hunters and the Pirates of Tortuga Island, was announced by BKN on 15 May 2008, and was released on DVD in the United States by Image Entertainment on 9 March 2010.

Similar to the Zorro: Generation Z DVD movies, Dork Hunters and the Pirates of Tortuga Island consists of three related episodes (The "Summer Vacation" three-parter) edited in a feature-length format.

=== Reception ===
Brian Costello from Common Sense Media gave the film one star, criticising the main characters for their stereotypical personalities.

== Home media ==
In Australia, Magna Home Entertainment released two DVDs of the series each containing nine episodes on 9 May 2009, called "The Dorkinator", and "Dorks in Black".

In the United States, Image Entertainment released a three-disc set containing all 36 episodes of the series on 9 February 2010.

== Ratings ==
The series was the second most popular show on GMTV among children aged 4–9 for the year of 2008. It had an audience share of around 38%. It also ranked as the number two show in terms of share across all children 4–15 years in November 2008.
