= A Christmas Carol (2006 film) =

2006 animated film by Ric Machin

- DVD cover
- Directed by: Ric Machin
- Written by: Sean Catherine Derek
- Based on: A Christmas Carol by Charles Dickens
- Produced by: Rick Ungar; Allen Bohbot
- Starring: Tim Bentick; Keith Wickham; Alan Marriott (uncredited); Brian Bowles; Jo Wyatt; Teresa Gallagher; Adam Rhys Dee
- Narrated by: Tim Bentick
- Edited by: Sanjiv Gill; Prashant Khapre
- Music by: Allen Bohbot
- Production companies: BKN International; BKN New Media
- Distributed by: BKN Home Entertainment
- Release dates: November 6, 2006 (United States, theatrical); November 20, 2006 (United Kingdom)
- Running time: 48 minutes
- Countries: United Kingdom; Germany
- Language: English

A Christmas Carol (a.k.a. A Christmas Carol: Scrooge's Ghostly Tale) is a 2006 animated Christmas film. It is an adaptation of the 1843 Charles Dickens novella of the same name, and was produced by BKN International and BKN New Media, and was the first release in BKN's "BKN Classic Series" anthology of animated direct-to-video films.

A Christmas Carol portrays the characters in the novella as anthropomorphic animals: Ebenezer Scrooge and his family are skunks, Bob Cratchit and his family are rabbits, Jacob Marley is a cricket, and the Ghosts of Christmas Past, Present, and Future are a stork, a kangaroo, and a walrus, respectively. There are other deviations from the novella; for example, Marley is said to have been dead for two years instead of seven, the Ghost of Christmas Future is given dialogue, and Tiny Tim does not die in the hypothetical future presented to Scrooge but instead grows up to become a miser like Scrooge himself.

The film was first released in the United States theatrically in select cities by Kidtoon Films on November 6, 2006. It was released on DVD in the United Kingdom on November 20, by BKN Home Entertainment, and a day later in the United States on November 21, by Genius Products in the same year.

== Cast ==
- Timothy Bentinck as:
  - Narrator
  - Ebenezer Scrooge
- Jo Wyatt as Mrs. Cratchit
- Brian Bowles as Bob Cratchit
- Keith Wickham as:
  - Collector for the Orphanage #1
  - Scrooge's Father
  - The Ghost of Christmas Present
  - Ghost of Christmas Future
  - Jacob Marley
- Teresa Gallagher as:
  - Ghost of Christmas Past
  - Tiny Tim
  - Fan
- Adam Rhys Dee as Fred
- Alan Marriott as Collector for the Orphanage #2 (uncredited)

== See also ==
- List of Christmas films
- List of ghost films
- List of American films of 2006
- Adaptations of A Christmas Carol
- List of animated feature-length films
