= Ultimate Book of Spells =

- Title card
- Also known as: U.B.O.S.
- Genre: Animated children's television series
- Developed by: Sean Catherine Derek
- Directed by: Chuck Patton
- Voices of: Michael Dobson; Ron Halder; Cathy Weseluck; Janyse Jaud; Jim Byrnes; Patricia Drake; Saffron Henderson; Kirby Morrow; Pauline Newstone; Nicole Oliver; Kathleen Barr
- Theme music composer: Will Anderson; Jim West
- Country of origin: Canada
- Original language: English
- No. of seasons: 1
- No. of episodes: 26

Production
- Executive producers: Allen Bohbot; Nadia Nardonnet; Stephanie Graziano
- Running time: 20 minutes
- Production company: BKN International

Original release
- Network: YTV (Canada)
- Release: 12 September 2001 – 7 April 2002

Ultimate Book of Spells is a Canadian children's animated television series produced by BKN International. It first premiered on YTV Channel for kids in Canada. Inspired by the popular Harry Potter book and movie series, the show presents a trio of "wizards-in-training" at an enchanted private school run by Miss Crystalgazer. Cassy is a junior witch, Gus is a half-elf/half-human junior wizard, and Verne is a promising "mortie", i.e. a non-magical human. With the guidance of the talking Ultimate Book of Spells (aka U.B.O.S.), the three have to defeat the evil wizard Zarlak from escaping the center of the earth.

== Characters ==
=== Main characters ===
- Cassandra "Cassy" (voiced by Janyse Jaud) - The leader of the trio, junior witch and the main protagonist of the series. She wants to become a sorceress, a class considered superior to witches. It is revealed that Cassy is the great-granddaughter of the supreme wizard who defeated and banished Zarlak to the center of the Earth, presumably sacrificing himself in the process.
- Gus (voiced by Andrew Francis) - He is half elf and half wizard. He is quite confident and sometimes acts childishly. Initially, he looks down on Verne, due to his "mortie" status, but Verne manages to redeem himself by saving Gus' life.
- Verne Ambrosius Hardwig (voiced by Cathy Weseluck) - A mortal wizard who has innate magical powers and can naturally mend electronic devices with touch alone. Because of his mortal status, he is called a "mortie". At some points, he is quite cowardly and is surprised by almost anything that involves magic. He is quite skilled in techno-magic, which is good for putting ordinary electronics or mechanical devices together to make useful gadgets. It is revealed that he, along with his mother, is a descendant of the mighty supreme wizard Merlin, as he resembles the ancient supreme wizard, explaining why he is the only one in his family to possess extraordinarily powerful magical gifts.
- U.B.O.S. (voiced by Ron Halder) - A living spellbook that has the power to teleport the destined "Power of Three" to the center of the earth, where they must stop Zarlak from draining all of the world's magic as well as keep U.B.O.S. out of his hands. He tends to be quite grumpy (mostly when Cassy stuffs him in her backpack) and hits the three on the head when he's scolding them. It is revealed throughout the series that he is Cassy's great-grandfather.
- Prince Erbert (voiced by Michael Dobson) - A prince who was cursed by a witch to look like a toy frog and confined at Vonderland. He is the friend of the trio and U.B.O.S. He stays with Gus and Verne in their room. Although he refuses at first, he is seen travelling with them to defeat Zarlak in some episodes.
- Zarlak (voiced by Paul Dobson) - An evil wizard and the main antagonist of the series who seeks world domination upon his release from the center of the Earth. He desires to get his hands on U.B.O.S., so that he will have enough magical power to not only escape his prison, but to dominate all who oppose him. He was defeated by the renowned supreme wizard Gez, Cassandra's great-grandfather.
- Rowce and Snerrot (voiced by Don Brown and Colin Murdock) - Zarlak's dimwitted henchmen whom he often loses patience with. They have the power to combine to become a two-headed dragon.

=== Supporting characters ===
- Ilsa - A 12-foot-tall (3.7 m) giant girl who was roommates with Cassy for a short while. Due to her size, Ilsa had trouble fitting in.
- Lucretia and Borgia (both voiced by Cathy Weseluck) - Lucretia and Borgia are arrogant and selfish fraternal twins who try to make trouble for Cassy, Gus and Verne. Their father used to serve under Zarlak, but defected before the former's defeat and imprisonment, thus avoiding punishment for his crimes.
- Headmistress Crystalgazer (voiced by Patricia Drake) - The headmistress of Vonderland. She can transform into a cat at will. Like the rest, she is blissfully oblivious to her three students' adventures to try and stop Zarlak.
- Saysme - Another teacher of Vonderland; he is a young man with a top hat and teaches age regression magic.
- Professor Beagleboyce - The librarian of Vonderland.
- Mayday - A ghost in charge of scoot-zoomer driving tests.
- Scrimpy - An imp who calls out to the trio for help when Zarlak attacks his village.
- Flaherty - A leprechaun who was forced into helping Lucretia cheat, by tinkering with Cassie's scoot-zoomer while racing, before he was freed.
- Wingo and Jingo - Two mischievous gremlins who were cast into a cuckoo clock for 100 years after losing a battle with Vonderland's builders. They are allowed to come out once a century to play while the whole school is put under a sleeping spell.
- Snap the Dragon (voiced by Michael Dobson) - A dragon.

== Other voices ==
- Tony Alcanter
- Michael Benyaer
- Don Brown
- Jim Byrnes
- Richard Cox
- Paul Dobson
- Patricia Drake
- Brian Drummond
- Andrew Francis
- McKenzie Gray
- Ron Halder
- Phil Hayes
- Saffron Henderson
- Mark Hildreth
- Matt Hill
- Janyse Jaud
- Ellie King
- Terry Klassen
- Michael Kopsa
- Campbell Lane
- Blu Mankuma
- Kirby Morrow
- Colin Murdock
- Richard Newman
- Pauline Newstone
- Nicole Oliver
- William Samples
- Tabitha St. Germain
- Sam Vincent
- Cathy Weseluck
- Colleen Wheeler
- Alec Willows

== Crew ==
- Susan Blu - Voice Director
- Sean Catherine Derek - Story Editor

== Episodes ==
Ep. #	Broadcast Date	Title	Written by	Description
1	12 September 2001	Three Is A Charm	Sean Catherine Derek	A mortie named Verne arrives at a magic school. He meets Gus, a half-elf second-year junior wizard and Cassandra, a third-year junior witch who aspires to become a full-fledged supreme sorceress. He also meets the evil twins, Lucretia and Borgia, and the headmistress Miss Crystalgazer. The talking all-powerful spellbook-of-spellbooks U.B.O.S. takes the three friends to the center of the Earth, where an evil supreme wizard Zarlak is stealing magic from the outside world. U.B.O.S. tells the trio that are the prophesied "Power of Three," the only ones magically strong enough to beat Zarlak and defeat him should his release come to pass.
2	19 September 2001	Man or Mortie	Sean Catherine Derek	Cassandra, Gus and Verne need to come up with an antidote to stop winged beings from crashing into turrets of the castle.
3	26 September 2001	He Who Laughs Last	Sean Roche	The trio have to stop Zarlak's plan to take joy from the surface world by abducting fairies. How Verne came to be at Vonderland School is revealed.
4	3 October 2001	Rootopia of All Evil	Jack & Carole Mendelsohn	Zarlak plans to steal all the flowers (and the happiness) for himself. As volunteer gardener, Cassy is determined to help the flowers grow, even missing a race between the Twins. Zarlak takes her and the remaining Forget-Me-Not to his underground domain and seemingly hypnotizes Cassy into helping him. Verne and Gus need to work together to reclaim the happiness of the world and the flowers before everything comes up Zarlak.
5	10 October 2001	Time and Again	Dennis Haley; Marcy Brown	The class goes back in time to Zarlak's trial, and Gus inadvertently takes a pink crystal that Cassy's great-grandfather Gez needed for his final battle with Zarlak in 1776. This small act creates a dystopia in the present timeline.
6	17 October 2001	Fire with Fire	Bob Forward	Gus discovers that the elves are losing their magical powers because a huge dragon has stolen the Elfin Stone, which Zarlak intends to use to destroy the Power of Three once and for all.
7	24 October 2001	The New Librarian	Douglas Gayeton	Professor Beagleboyce becomes the new librarian, and absorbs the contents of all of the library's books, making Verne suspicious. It's revealed that Zarlak is using the old wizard to gain all of the knowledge the books pages contain.
8	31 October 2001	Shadow Land	Sean Roche	Verne has to fight a shadow creature who has taken Cassy and Gus' shadows for Zarlak. Without them, Cassy and Gus' light side take over, making them goofy and playful. Once in Shadow Land, Verne uses his mortie smarts to distract Zarlak and return Cassy and Gus' shadows to them.
9	7 November 2001	Once in a Blue Moon	Sean Roche	Zarlak kidnaps the Charmlings, little elf-like people who can grant any wish. He is looking for the ancient Ring of the Blue Moon, which shall make his release a reality. Cassy needs to do well on her test to level up in order to get into Advanced Sorcery class. With the Ring in his possession, Zarlak finally breaks free and wreaks havoc and chaos onto the surface. The Power of Three go the rescue the Charmlings in their home realm, and try to get Cassy's school project back from Zarlak. Cassy wishes the Ring to be in her hands and they return to Vonderland, but U.B.O.S. has a bad feeling.
10	14 November 2001	The Bind That Ties	Glenn Leopold	Zarlak has captured all the bookbinder gnomes, which makes all the books unglued and devastates U.B.O.S. In his delirium, he hints to Verne that he is Gez himself to remain hidden from both the magical world and Zarlak. Verne promises to not tell Cassy of U.B.O.S.' direct connection to her maternal great-grandfather.
11	21 November 2001	Coat of Arms	Christy Marx; Randy Littlejohn	Cassy finds out that her maternal great-grandaunt Cassandra VII had teamed up with Zarlak many years ago. U.B.O.S. takes back in time to learn what had really happened, but end up being captured by Zarlak. In the end, it is revealed that Cassandra VII was merely deceiving Zarlak that she was one of his minions.
12	28 November 2001	Out of Shape	Glenn Leopold	Zarlak sends his dragon to steal U.B.O.S., but kidnaps Verne instead who had managed to transform into the Ultimate Book of Spells to deceive Zarlak. Cassy has to save the day, but she's having a hard time using her own newly developed shapeshifting powers.
13	5 December 2001	The Rift	Don Gillies	Scavenger imps use a portal to steal objects from the surface world, and two of their friends are in the hands of Zarlak.
14	9 January 2002	What a Cut-Up!	Julia Lewald	The Power of Three fight Zarlak again who has turned everything dull, from knives, to utensils, to the world itself.
15	16 January 2002	Multiple Mayhem	Sean Catherine Derek	Cassy creates a duplicate of herself to get to all her classes, but the duplicate starts acting out in unpredictable ways.
16	23 January 2002	The Tear of Moolana	Stevie Stern	Gus and Cassy compete with Zarlak to obtain the Tear of Moolana, a teardrop-shaped gemstone that offers infinite magical power. It's up to Verne to snap his best friends out of it.
17	30 January 2002	Magical Logical	Michael Edens	Everything is losing its logic - Video games, computers, wands and even U.B.O.S.! - and the trio has to find a way to bring it back.
18	10 February 2002	Veil of Illusion	Glenn Leopold	The "Veil of Illusion" disappears from the magic school, which is now visible to morties. The trio has to retrieve the Veil from a great wizard who is quite the collector of rare and powerful artifacts.
19	17 February 2002	Dark Image	Bob Forward	A magical artifact turns Verne into a dark wizard, and Cassy a dark sorceress. Gus has to stop them from destroying the earth and each other, but Zarlak takes full advantage of the situation.
20	24 February 2002	Sleeping Beauty School	Sean Roche	Creatures from a land behind the grandfather clock came to Vonderland and cast a sleeping spell on everyone except the trio.
21	3 March 2002	Eclipsed	B.W. Glass	At the famous Festivus Solarus (the festival where all witches and wizards at Vonderland get together to celebrate the time when the Moon eclipses the Sun), the Moon is frozen in front of the Sun and the temperature drops below zero.
22	10 March 2002	Big Girls Don't Cry	Nathan Long	Cassy's new roommate, a giant named Ilsa, is manipulated by Lucretia and gets kidnapped by Zarlak to trade for U.B.O.S.
23	17 March 2002	Lucky Gus	Don Gillies	Gus' sudden good luck and popularity make Cassy and Verne quite jealous - just as Zarlak planned! A battle ensues with Zarlak finally getting his hands on U.B.O.S., but is stopped by Verne and Cassy as the luck spell on Gus is lifted. Fortunately, Gus is able to make his own luck and save the day.
24	24 March 2002	Magic Quest	Bob Forward	Sitting in Merlin's magic chair, Cassandra and Verne start to transform into the creatures of their ancestors. Verne has to find the ingredients for a spell to turn them back. Encountering the spirit of Merlin himself, the resemblance between him and Verne is apparent, which implies that Verne had inherited his increasingly powerful magical abilities from his maternal relatives. Another twist is that Merlin had also trained Supreme Wizard Gez, who he considered his best pupil.
25	31 March 2002	The Lure	Sean Catherine Derek; Lori Librarian	When Gus fails his midterms, he goes on the high seas and gets everyone in big trouble.
26	7 April 2002	Solo Sorceress	Dennis Haley; Marcy Brown; Sean Catherine Derek	Cassy sees Lucretia cheat during their scooter race contest, but nobody believes her. Determined to prove it, Cassandra accidentally causes an incident that requires U.B.O.S.'s aid.

In the U.S. DVD release of this series, "Solo Sorceress" is not the final episode as the episode occurs significantly earlier in the play order.

== Production ==
BKN International originally began developing the project in 2000 under the working title, “Journey to the Center of the Earth,” based on Jules Verne’s book by the same name. Said title was filed at May 25th, 2000. However, the title was changed for an unknown reason.

On 19 April 2001, BKN pre-sold the series (originally planned to have 52 episodes), to CBBC in the United Kingdom.

On 20 June 2002, Toon Disney purchased the North American broadcast rights for the series.

Certain episodes had different working titles:

1. “Multiple Mayhem” was originally called “Double, double, We're in Trouble!”
2. “Once in a Blue Moon” was originally called “Blue Moon Mania”
3. “Shadowland” was originally called “Escape Shadowland”.

== Home media ==
=== United Kingdom ===
In the United Kingdom, Universal Pictures Video released two VHS volumes. The first - "Three is a Charm", was released in 2002, and the second: "Solo Sorceress" was released on 21 April 2003. A double-pack containing both tapes was also released.

"Three is a Charm" was later released on DVD by Universal on 10 May 2004.

=== United States ===
A VHS tape containing two episodes titled "The Mystic Gem" was released at an unknown date.

Budget distributor Digiview Entertainment released three DVDs each containing four episodes in 2007, titled "Three's a Charm", "Fire with Fire" and "Out of Shape".

Mill Creek Entertainment released a two-disc boxset containing all 26 episodes on 5 January 2010.

== Cancelled Video Game ==
On 7 October 2001, TDK Mediactive announced they would produce a platformer video game based on the series in 2002, however it was quietly cancelled.
