= Zorro: Generation Z =

Animated series

- Based on: Zorro by Johnston McCulley
- Developed by: Rick Ungar; Sean Catherine Derek; Sandra Curtis
- Directed by: Stuart Evans (eps 1-2); Walt Kubiak (eps 3-26)
- Voices of: Ben Small; Michael Rosenbaum; Jules de Jongh; Janet Brown; Morgan Deare; Luis Soto
- Composer: Allen Bohbot
- Countries of origin: United Kingdom; Germany; United States
- Original languages: English; German
- No. of seasons: 1
- No. of episodes: 26

Production
- Executive producers: Rick Ungar; Allen Bohbot; John Gertz; Sandra Curtis
- Producer: Stuart Evans
- Production companies: BKN International; BKN New Media; Zorro Productions

Original release
- Network: Pop
- Release: 16 March – 7 September 2006

Zorro: Generation Z is an animated series that began in 2006, and produced by BKN International, BKN New Media and Zorro Productions. Former Marvel Studios development executive Rick Ungar developed the original series. The programming deal and concept for the new series was developed by Ungar, G7, and Pangea and underwritten partially by a master toy license with Brazilian toy company, Gulliver Toys. What made the show unique were the plethora of Pangea-designed high tech gadgets and the conceit of having the young Zorro ride his motorcycle named after his horse, Tornado.

== Plot ==
In 2015, teenager Diego de la Vega, the five times great-grandson of the original Zorro, discovers his heritage and decides to take up the mantle. Clad in a black suit and high-tech weapons, Zorro signs the "Z" to establish justice in the metropolis of Pueblo Grande, California.

== Cast and characters ==
=== Main ===
- Diego de la Vega / Zorro - After living abroad for sometime, Diego returns to Pueblo Grande when his father is kidnapped by Mayor Martínez, to prevent him from running in the election. Diego grew up listening to his grandfather's stories about Zorro and is quick to take over the family role after he and Bernardo find the Fox Den. He rides a motorcycle called the Tornado–Z (named after the original Zorro's horse) and wields the Z–Weapon, a multi–purpose laser weapon which can act as a gun, sword, bow-staff or whip/grappling hook. The Z-Weapon also has a "DNA lock"; meaning that only he or a member of his family can activate it. In addition, his cape is bulletproof and can function as a parachute or a glider. He is based on Don Diego de la Vega from the original novel. He is voiced by Ben Small.
- Bernardo - Diego's best friend and a technological genius - the mute Bernardo maintains Zorro's equipment, does online detective work and occasionally wears the costume when Diego and Zorro need to appear together. He is based on Don Diego's deaf/mute manservant Bernardo from the original novel. Bernardo is very loving and affectionate with a snarky sense of humor. He and Diego are almost brothers as they both grew up together on the same street. Their bond is so deep that Bernardo can usually convey what he wants to say to Diego through facial expressions. Diego's grandfather also gave Bernardo a small fortune which he used to repair Diego's bike in one episode.
- Alejandro de la Vega - Diego's father and the owner of De La Vega Industries. He is unaware of the family secret; until recently assumed Zorro was a myth. He is still unsure that a masked crusader is what the city needs, but doesn't argue with the good Zorro does and never openly opposes him. He worries a lot about Diego's lack of responsibility, assuming his son is out all night partying. Based on Don Alejandro de la Vega in previous versions. He is voiced by Eric Meyers.
- Mrs. McAlistair - The de la Vegas' Irish housekeeper. She knows Diego's secret as Zorro and approves of what he is doing. She is voiced by Janet Brown.
- Maria Martinez / Scarlet Whip - The daughter of Horace Martinez. Maria adopts a costumed identity to fight against her father's corruption using a pair of laser-whips. She and Diego are at college together and have a friendly rivalry. Neither knows the other's secret identity; until near the end of the final episode in Season 1 "Poll Axed". She is somewhat similar to Lolita Quintero in the 1940 version of The Mark of Zorro or Theresa in the 1974 version - both of whom are Zorro's love interest and the Alcalde's niece - her masked identity may be based on the title character of the 1944 film Zorro's Black Whip. According to the series' bible; her costumed identity was originally going to be the Black Whip rather than the Scarlet Whip, but it was changed to better distinguish her from Zorro. She is voiced by Jules de Jongh.

=== Supporting ===
- Don Diego de la Vega / Zorro - The first Zorro and ancestor of the present Zorro. He is only seen in one episode where Diego is somehow sent back in time and fights alongside him against the villain El Fantasma. He is voiced by Morgan Deare.
- Isabella - The love interest of the original Zorro. She is voiced by Patricia Villa.
- Gustavo de la Vega / Zorro - Diego's late grandfather was the Zorro before him. Gustavo chose to keep the family legacy a secret from Alejandro as he felt that his son was not meant to be Zorro and would not want to be Zorro either. Now he often appears in dream sequences and flashbacks by giving Diego advice about how to be Zorro. He is voiced by Morgan Deare.
- Alejandro's grandmother - She was a Native American and, like Diego's grandfather, has died before the series begins but appears in dream sequences as a young girl who offers cryptic advice. She is probably based on the character White Owl from some recent re–telling of the Zorro story. She only appears in The Perfect Fox Hunt.

=== Villains ===
- Horace Martinez - The corrupt ex-mayor of Pueblo Grande, Martinez was Zorro's greatest enemy. In addition to imposing high taxes and secretly running Pueblo Grande's organised crime, he was a business rival of the De la Vega family and often targeted Alejandro's company with his criminal schemes. He swears revenge on Gloria Sheffield after she beats him in the mayoral election. He is based on the corrupt alcaldes in earlier versions of Zorro and bears a strong resemblance to Alcalde Quintero in the 1974 film, The Mark of Zorro. He is voiced by Morgan Deare.
- Gloria Sheffield - Founder and CEO of Sheffield Industries, and mayor of Pueblo Grande. After Alejandro de la Vega had dropped out of mayor elections, Gloria Sheffield planned a series of citywide sabotages to destroy Horace Martínez's reputation in order to overtake the mayoral position in the election. Gloria ended up being elected the new mayor of Pueblo Grande despite Zorro and Scarlet Whip's attempt to help Horace. She is now the new threat to the city of Pueblo Grande, and new enemy of Zorro and Scarlet Whip. She is voiced by Sarah Douglas.
- Jack Sheffield - Gloria Sheffield's son is disguised as a dumb jock at Pueblo Grande College. However, he was the technical genius behind the citywide sabotages and the retina recognition program to uncover the true identities of Zorro and Scarlet Whip. Later, Zorro is able to work out Jack's role in the citywide sabotage and discovers the potential identity leak. Bernardo was eventually able to intercept Jack's retina recognition program by replacing the final image with the Sheffields. He is voiced by John Schwab.
- Sergeant Garcia - The mayor's aide and head of the Pueblo Grande Police Department. Sergeant Garcia is corrupt enough to turn a blind eye to his boss' actions most of the time, but not enough to actually get involved or allow anyone to get hurt. His role is usually to tell the police not to investigate, but is more than happy to arrest the criminals Zorro defeats. He is clumsy and always eating (usually spilling his food whenever someone calls for him). He is based on Sergeant Garcia in the 1950s TV series, Zorro. He is voiced by Luis Soto.
- Alfredo Catalano - A scientist who invented an earthquake machine. After his invention was discovered by Maria and Diego he was hired by Mayor Martínez for city demolition jobs. However his first job under the mayor was foiled by Zorro and Scarlet Whip and he is subsequently arrested.
- Augusto Catalano - Alfredo's twin brother specializing in nanites research. When Augusto offered his service to Mayor Martínez, in exchange for releasing his brother, Martínez demands Augusto destroys Zorro first. When Augusto's plan was initially successful in stopping Zorro the mayor changed his terms to demand he destroys Scarlet Whip as well. With Zorro's equipment infected by nanites Zorro turns to an old barn for a horse and antique weapons to fight Augusto. Zorro breaks into Augusto's lab and captures him. He is voiced by Luis Soto.
- El Fantasma - The villain from the 1800s and enemy of the original Zorro. He is voiced by Wayne Forester.
- The Dons - A group of criminal hoodlums hired by Mayor Martínez to take charge of various criminal businesses in Pueblo Grande. But when Gloria Sheffield came to Pueblo Grande and ran for mayor, they switched sides and ended up being hired by her.
  - Alan Marriott as Itchy the Hook / Don Skull
  - Morgan Deare as Don Ringo
- Fearsome Four - Criminals hired by Mayor Martínez to destroy Zorro but they end up unleashing mayhem in Pueblo Grande and try to take over the city themselves. They are eventually defeated by Zorro.

== Episodes ==
No.	Title	Written by	Original release date
1	"A New Generation Part I"	Rick Ungar	16 March 2006
Diego de la Vega assumes the family mantle of Zorro after his father is kidnapped by the corrupt Mayor Martinez.
2	"A New Generation Part II"	Rick Ungar and Sean Catherine Derek	23 March 2006
Zorro teams-up with the Scarlet Whip (who is secretly Martinez's daughter, Maria) to rescue his father from Martinez.
3	"The Fearsome Four"	Rick Ungar	30 March 2006
Martinez hires the eponymous terrorists to eliminate Zorro, but they prove to be uncontrollable.
4	"Sins Of The Father"	Sean Catherine Derek	6 April 2006
The Scarlet Whip helps Zorro stop Martinez's armored car robberies, but sabotages Zorro's plan to expose her father's crimes.
5	"Mayor For A Day"	Rick Ungar	13 April 2006
Martinez reluctantly grants Diego's birthday request to spend the day as the honorary mayor of Pueblo Grande.
6	"Wanted: Part Time Hero"	Sean Catherine Derek	20 April 2006
Diego's father cuts him off from his trust fund, which forces Diego to get a job in order to fund the repair of the wrecked Tornado Z.
7	"The Perfect Fox Hunt"	Sean Catherine Derek	27 April 2006
Martinez hires a bounty hunter to uncover Zorro's secret identity.
8	"Hostile Takeover"	Sean Catherine Derek	4 May 2006
An arms dealing countess attempts to force Martinez to do her bidding by abducting Maria.
9	"The Underground"	Steven Darancette	11 May 2006
Sergeant Garcia goes behind Martinez's back to ask for help from Zorro and the Scarlet Whip after homeless people that he has befriended are accused of stealing the mayor's gold.
10	"Masquerade"	Jennifer Cabrera and Rick Ungar	18 May 2006
Martinez hires thugs to commit crimes while dressed like Zorro on Halloween.
11	"Double Date"	Bob Forward	25 May 2006
Diego and Maria go on a date to Martinez's charity fundraiser, which is attacked by the Fearsome Four.
12	"That Old School Spirit"	Tom Sito	1 June 2006
The ghost of a Maya-Aztec warrior begins terrorizing Pueblo Grande.
13	"Don Payaso"	Kevin Hopps	8 June 2006
A gang of criminal clowns run amok in Pueblo Grande.
14	"The Earthquake Machine"	Lee Cohen	15 June 2006
A mad professor named Alfredo Catalano invents a device that can cause tremors, and is blackmailed by Martinez into using it to demolish poor neighborhoods for gentrification.
15	"A 'Z' In Time"	Christy Marx and Randy Littlejohn	22 June 2006
A time-displaced Diego meets his ancestor, the original Zorro.
16	"Crush or Be Crushed"	Len Uhley	29 June 2006
The elderly Don Ringo has his granddaughter seduce Bernardo in a plot to get the deed to the de la Vegas' land.
17	"The Wounded Fox"	Glenn Leopold	6 July 2006
After Diego twists his ankle, Bernardo takes his place as Zorro to help the Scarlet Whip dismantle the mayor's new "Digi-Dons."
18	"Persona Non Grata"	Steven Darancette	13 July 2006
Angered over Diego never noticing her, a nerdy girl who is obsessed with him sets out to ruin his life and prove that he is Zorro.
19	"Diego's Cousin"	Kevin Hopps	20 July 2006
Martinez tries to force Diego's cousin, Kam, off of his and his family's property so that he can redevelop it.
20	"Crime Wave"	Steven Darancette	27 July 2006
A gang of criminal surfers begins robbing ships off of the shore of Pueblo Grande.
21	"Z-Virus"	Len Uhley	3 August 2006
Augusto Catalano, an expert in nanotechnology, offers to get rid of Zorro for Martinez in exchange for the release of his incarcerated twin brother, Alfredo.
22	"Mad About You"	Len Uhley	10 August 2006
The Scarlet Whip loses her memory and becomes convinced that Zorro is her enemy.
23	"The Rival"	Kevin Hopps	17 August 2006
Diego becomes jealous when Maria begins hanging out with the nephew of a deranged admiral who is going to blow up Pueblo Grande's navy yard.
24	"The Golden Dragon"	Glenn Leopold	24 August 2006
Martinez works with the new Dons of Chinatown to steal a priceless Chinese artifact called the Golden Dragon.
25	"The New Arrivals"	Kevin Hopps and Sean Catherine Derek	31 August 2006
When Diego's father drops out of the election for mayor, he is replaced by tech magnate Gloria Sheffield, who quickly proves to be even more ruthless than Martinez.
26	"Poll Axed"	Len Uhley	7 September 2006
Martinez swears revenge on Sheffield after she beats him in the mayoral election, while Sheffield's son, Jack, works to uncover the identities of Zorro and the Scarlet Whip.

== Movies ==
- Zorro: Return to the Future is a feature that includes the first 3 episodes of the series.
- Zorro and Scarlet Whip Revealed! is a feature that includes The Earthquake Machine, Z-Virus, and Poll Axed.

== Development and Broadcast ==
The show has been aired in the United Kingdom on Pop on 7 April 2008 and was shown on Kix! on 19 May 2008. This version of the Zorro story features a descendant of the original Zorro, named Diego de la Vega, as the original Zorro, fighting crime and the corrupt government of Pueblo Grande in a near-future setting. Zorro: Generation Z has yet to air in the United States. The series has already been shown in the Philippines via Hero TV and Australia on Network 10.

A planned second season of 26 episodes of the series was announced in 2009 for a release in 2010, entitled Zorro Generation Z: HD but it was not fully completed or released for broadcast as BKN International filed for insolvency in October 2009, despite a press statement from Nicola Andrews, managing director of BKN New Media Ltd in London, who noted: 'We have already commissioned and produced Season II for 2009."
