= Alan Marriott (voice actor) =

Canadian voice actor (born 1971)

- Born: July 19, 1971 (age 54); Penticton, British Columbia, Canada
- Education: Studio 58, LAMDA
- Occupations: Voice actor; dialect coach
- Years active: 1980–present

Alan Marriott (born July 19, 1971) is a Canadian voice actor, voice teacher and dialect coach.

== Career ==
Marriott moved to North Vancouver, British Columbia to attend the Studio 58 acting school. He left Studio 58 to join the first season of Salmon Arm Summer Stock Youth Theatre (SASSY) and did two seasons with the company. Marriott spent four years working with the improvisational theatre group Vancouver Theatresports and also played the character of Aldous Bacon in VSL's original production of Suspect (an improvised murder mystery). He later moved to London, England to complete his formal acting training at The London Academy of Music and Dramatic Art (LAMDA). Upon finishing LAMDA Marriott began working in improv once again, starting London Theatresports and creating and playing in numerous different improv formats including Hamlet Improvised, Impro Lear, Impro Lab (London's first 2-act improvised play), The Impro Musical, Lust Boulavarde (an improvised soap opera), and Impropera (a 2-act improvised opera).

Marriott has worked with or taught almost every improvisational theatre group in London, including Grand Theft Impro, Made Up Like Tarts, Scratch, Showstopper, The Comedy Store Players, Dogs on Holiday, Impro Musical, Impropera, Brickbats Volunteers, South of the River (with Steve Frost and Jeremy Hardy), and his own current impro troupe, The Crunchy Frog Collective. He currently helps form and trains an impro troupe in Vancouver BC titled 3rd and Main, and occasionally hosts their weekly shows at School Creative every Saturday at 8:00 pm.

Marriott has also done extensive voice acting work for radio, television, animation and documentaries, having been inspired by watching Looney Tunes cartoons during his childhood. His vocal work includes Mr. Fothergill, Mr. Ellis, Mr. Dixon, David Dixon, Dodger, Travis, Spud (regular series only), Mr. Bentley (regular series only) and Scoop in the US dub on Bob the Builder, the title character on Anthony Ant and Glar on Planet 51. He also voiced Victor Volt in The Secret Show, and the Indian in A Town Called Panic. In 2016, Marriott voiced the characters Buried Lede and Mr. Stripes in the season six My Little Pony: Friendship is Magic episode "The Saddle Row Review". Marriott also had onscreen appearances on several British television series including Wake Up in the Wild Room, The Bootleg Broadway Show, The All New Alexei Sayle Show, Ghost Train, Jo Brand Through the Cakehole and the television movie Now What.

Marriott wrote the book Genius Now!. He also wrote one episode of Wolves, Witches and Giants and Animal Stories (in which he narrated the American-dubbed version for The Disney Channel), several comedy sketches for CBC, and a short film called Teeth. He worked as a voice director for the BKN Classic Series trilogy where he directed the voices for all six of their films, including Alice in Wonderland: What's the Matter with Hatter?, The Jungle Book: Rikki-Tikki-Tavi to the Rescue, Robin Hood: Quest for the King, The Three Musketeers: Saving the Crown, The Prince and the Pauper: Double Trouble and A Christmas Carol.

After 20 years living and working in London, Marriott relocated to Vancouver in 2008, but returned to the United Kingdom in the summer of 2017, currently residing in London. He created ImprovMusical, a one-hour improvised musical based on a single audience suggestion. It premiered in July 2010 and played at Vancouver Theatresports.

== Selected filmography ==
- Devilman (1994–1995) - Akira Fudo / Devilman (English dub)
- Tokyo Babylon (1994) - Culprit (English dub)
- Appleseed (1994) - Charon Mautholos (English dub)
- Jumping Flash! (1995) - Narrator
- Megazone 23: Part III (1995) - Borno, Leicester (World Wide Group dub)
- Patlabor 2: The Movie (1996) - Motoahshi, JGSDF, News Anchor, Rookie Pilot (World Wide Group dub)
- Mad Bull 34 (1996) - Daizaburo "Eddie" Ban (English dub)
- Wake Up in the Wild Room (1996–1998) - Additional voices
- Violence Jack: Evil Town (1996) - Blue Kid (English dub)
- Jumping Flash! 2 (1996) - Captain Kabuki, MuuMuu, Narrator
- Violence Jack: Harem Bomber (1996) - Minion (English dub)
- Junk Boy (1996) - Ryohei Yamazaki (English dub)
- The Dark Myth (1996) - Takeshi (English dub)
- Pond Life (1997) - Gym Instructor
- The Feeble Files (1997) - Various voices
- Animal Stories (1998–2001) - Narrator, characters (North American dub)
- Lucky and Zorba (1998) - Secretary/Gopher (English dub)
- Anthony Ant (1999) - Anthony, Arnold, Buzz
- Santa's Special Delivery (1999) - Various voices
- X (2000) - Kamui Shirō (English dub)
- Vampires, Pirates & Aliens (2000–2001) - Zorb, Sharky, Gory
- Tom and Jerry in Fists of Furry (2000) - Tom Cat, Jerry Mouse, Spike and Tyke, Nibbles, Little Quacker, Butch
- Millionaire Dogs (2000) - J.D., Ronnie, John Fairview (English dub)
- Urusei Yatsura (2000) - Chibi (BBC 3 dub)
- Twipsy (2000) - Nick Walker, Albert Barkhorn
- Desperados: Wanted Dead or Alive (2001) - Additional voices
- Nickelodeon (2001–2004) - Continuity voiceover
- Bob the Builder (2001–2009) - Scoop, Travis, Dodger, Spud (2001–2004), Mr. Bentley (2001–2004), Mr. Fothergill, Mr. Ellis, Mr. Dixon, Chip Chipper, David Dixon, Lenny (North American dub)
- Tom and Jerry in War of the Whiskers (2002) - Jerry Mouse, Tyke, Nibbles, Little Quacker
- Island Xtreme Stunts (2002) - Nick Brick, Snap Lockitt, Enter, Return, Lucky Larry, Technician Bob
- Spheriks (2002) - Match Narrator
- Teeth (2002) - Dr. Horace Morgan
- Bounty Hamster (2003) - Marion
- Space Channel 5: Part 2 (2003) - Noize (English version)
- Yoko! Jakamoko! Toto! (2003–2005) - Additional voices
- Globi and the Stolen Shadows (2003) - Maestro (English dub)
- Headhunter Redemption (2004) - Psycho Star, additional voices
- Back to Gaya (2004) - Boo (English dub)
- Hot Wheels: Stunt Track Challenge (2004) - Ryan Stone
- Legend of the Dragon (2005–2008) - Ang, Golden Dragon
- Zorro: Generation Z (2006) - Itchy the Hook, Don Skull, Shifty
- Planet Sketch (2005) - Ninja Handyman, additional voices
- The Secret Show (2006–2007) - Victor Volt
- A Christmas Carol (2006) - Collector for the Orphanage #2 (uncredited)
- Mama Mirabelle's Home Movies (2007–2008) - Gerald, Bo's Dad, Tom, Terrence, Herman, Bobby, Fungus, Scrunch, Gordon (North American dub)
- Assassin in the Limelight (2008) - Henry Cray Ford
- Dork Hunters from Outer Space (2008–2009) - Mac
- Chop Socky Chooks (2008) - Iron Butt Monk
- Holly and Hal Moose: Our Uplifting Christmas Adventure (2008) - Donner, Blitzen
- A Town Called Panic (2008) - Indian (English dub)
- Skate 2 (2009) - Tramp, additional voices (English dub)
- Dinosaur Train (2009–2021) - Henry Hermit Crab, Iggy Iguanodon, Mayor Kosmoceratops, Herbie Hermit Crab, Hap Haplocheirus, Deon Dimetrodon, Bernie Beetle, Cornelius Crab
- Geronimo Stilton (2009–2017) - Additional voices
- Planet 51 (2009) - Glar
- Dead Rising 2 (2010) - Deetz Hartman, Survivors, Mercenaries
- Hot Wheels Battle Force 5 (2010) - Simon Ian Rhodes II
- Dead Rising 2: Case West (2010) - Security Guards, Survivors
- Voltron Force (2011–2012) - Sven Holgersson
- Dead Rising 2: Off the Record (2011) - Deetz Hartman
- Lego Ninjago: Masters of Spinjitzu (2012–2022) - Darreth, Captain Soto, Mr. Hutchins, Phil, Color Commentator, Stone Warrior, Aquarium Host, Guard #2 (1), Writer, Boy Fan, Talk Show Host, The Mechanic, Pirate Guard, Henchman, Perp, Partner
- Superbook (2013–2015) - Arsalan, Barry, Job, Natan, Relative
- Asterix: The Mansions of the Gods (2015–2016) - Cacofonix (English dubs), Anonymous (Ocean Productions dub)
- Lego Star Wars: Droid Tales (2015) - Agent Kallus
- Nexo Knights (2015–2016) - Chef Rambley, Mr. Cheddarton
- Martha Speaks (2015) - Additional voices
- My Little Pony: Friendship is Magic (2016) - Buried Lede, Mr. Stripes
- Total War: Warhammer II (2017) - Grom the Paunch
- Norm of the North 2: Keys to the Kingdom (2019) - Stan, Polar Bear #1
- Norm of the North: King Sized Adventure (2019) - Stan
- Octonauts (2019–present) - Bud, additional voices
- The Lovecraft Invasion (2020) - H. P. Lovecraft, Randolph Carter
- My Magic Pet Morphle (2021–present) - Jorn, Stein
- Compare the Market (2021) - Ravenscroft
- Lost in Random: The Eternal Die (2025) - The Formageddon, The Old Child
- Disney Speedstorm (2025) - Scrooge McDuck
