= Rick Ungar =

American film producer (born 1950)

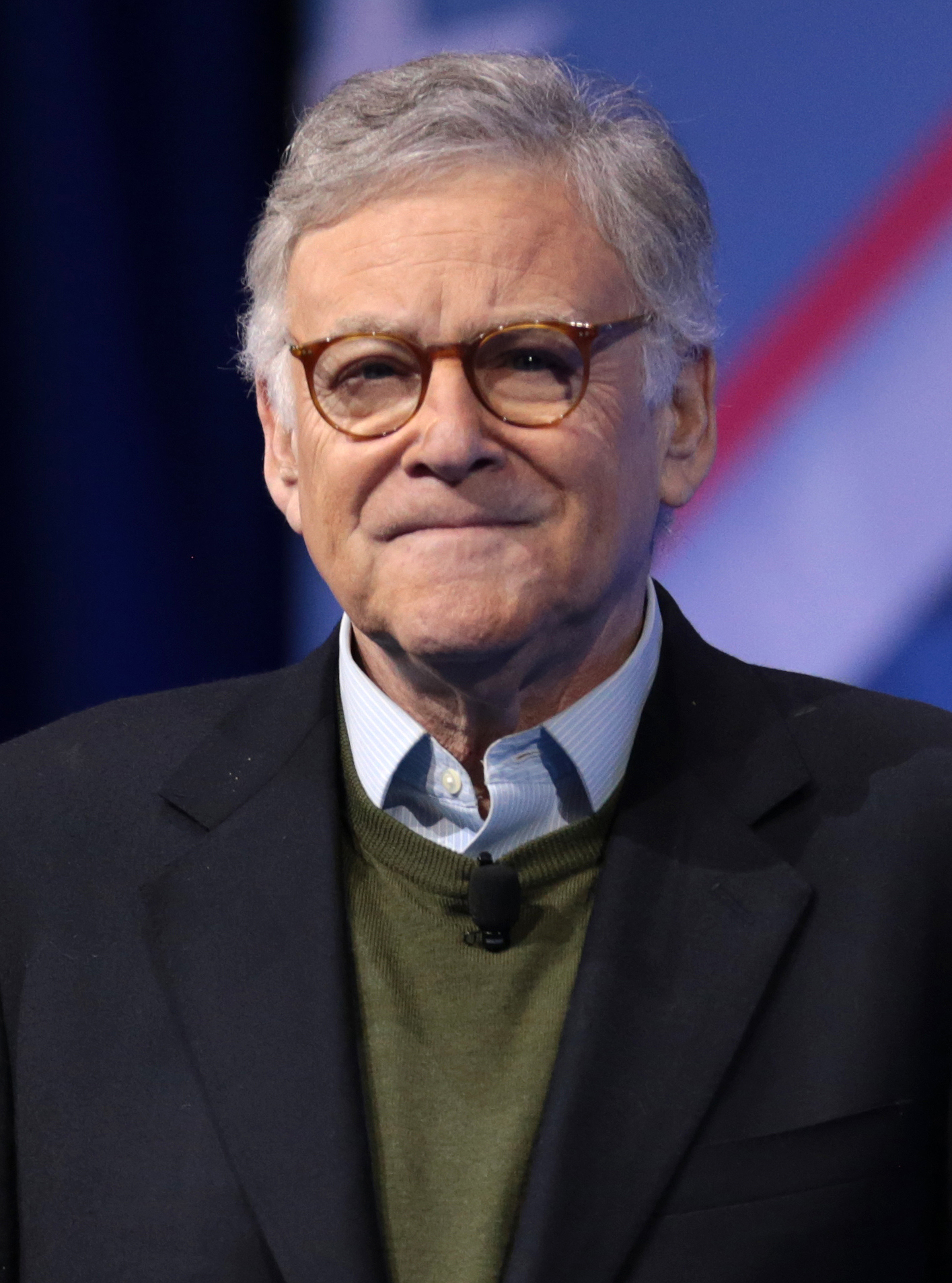
- Ungar in 2017
- Born: Richard Ungar; November 4, 1950 (age 75); Youngstown, Ohio, U.S.
- Occupations: Writer, producer
- Writing career
- Notable works: Biker Mice from Mars; Legend of the Dragon

Richard Ungar (/ˈʌŋɡər/; born November 4, 1950) is an American film producer and radio host. He is the host of The Rick Ungar Show, a two hour political and news commentary radio show. Ungar is also the editor-in-chief of The Daily Centrist website. Previously, Ungar was the co-host of Steele & Ungar on SiriusXM's P.O.T.U.S. (Sirius XM) channel, and was a political commentary contributor to Forbes.com, Newsmax TV, and Forbes on Fox. Earlier, Ungar was a Hollywood writer and producer in television, particularly in the animation industry.

== Career ==
Ungar became president of Marvel Productions in 1991, with added responsibility in December 1992, for New World Family Filmworks and New World Action Animation. He created and worked on Biker Mice from Mars, which began its first run in the United States and the United Kingdom in 1993. In fall 1993, Biker Mice from Mars was launched in syndication then carried by UPN. After a short stint as Marvel Entertainment CEO, Ungar returned to oversee newly renamed New World Animation in November 1993. In August 1995, Ungar became president, first-run and animated programing of New World Entertainment.

Ungar in September 1998 was hired as chairman and CEO of Bohbot Kids Network. In November 1999, Ungar was hired by Marvel Enterprises as president of the Marvel Character Group, its IP and marketing group.

Ungar returned to producing by setting up Brentwood Television Funnies (BTF). Through Brentwood, he produced the all new Biker Mice from Mars, which launched in the UK and Finland in 2006 to great ratings and followed by Italy and the United States in 2008. However, its high ratings were not long lasting, as it didn't live up to the original series from the 90s and fans reaction was mostly negative; in spite of that, the episode Here Come the Judge won a daytime Emmy award for the show and voice-over Jim Ward, who voiced all four faces of the Crusher.

In May 2010, Ungar was hired as head writer and executive producer for 41 Entertainment, Allen Bohbot’s new animation company.

=== News commentary career ===
Ungar was a senior political contributor to Forbes.com from September 1. 2010 to January 14, 2016. Ungar appeared as a contributor on Forbes on Fox from 2012–2014.

Beginning in January 2014 and until October 2016, Ungar fulfilled a number of on air roles at Newsmax TV, including as the Co-Host of The Daily Wrap.

Ungar was the co-host of Steele & Ungar on SiriusXM's P.O.T.U.S. (Sirius XM) channel, which aired from March 22, 2014 to June 29, 2018.

In early 2019, Ungar launched The Daily Centrist website, where he serves as Editor In Chief.

On March 4, 2019, Ungar began hosting The Rick Ungar Show, weeknights 6 p.m. – 8 p.m. ET, and can be heard on affiliate radio stations and podcast.

== Producer credits ==
=== Television ===
- X-Men (1992–1993)
- Biker Mice from Mars (1993–1996)
- Iron Man (1994)
- Fantastic Four (1994)
- The Incredible Hulk (1996–1997)
- Roswell Conspiracies: Aliens, Myths and Legends (1997–1999)
- Mutant X (2001)
- Spider-Man: The New Animated Series (2003)
- X-Men: Evolution (2000–2003)
- Legend of the Dragon (2005–2008)
- Zorro: Generation Z (2006)
- Biker Mice from Mars (2006–2007)
- Dork Hunters from Outer Space (2008)
- Pac-Man and the Ghostly Adventures (2013–2015)

=== Film ===
- P. J. Sparkles (1992)
- A Christmas Carol (2006)
- Kong: Return to the Jungle (2007)
- Ali Baba and the Forty Thieves: The Lost Scimitar of Arabia (2005)

== Screenwriting credits ==
=== Television ===
- Biker Mice from Mars (1993)
- Roswell Conspiracies: Aliens, Myths and Legends (1999)
- X-Men: Evolution (2000-2001)
- Zorro: Generation Z (2006)
- Biker Mice from Mars (2006-2007)
- Legend of the Dragon (2008)
- Dork Hunters from Outer Space (2008)

=== Film ===
- Kong: Return to the Jungle (2007)
