= Anthony Ant =

- Genre: Children's series; Animated series
- Voices of: Alan Marriott; April Ford; Adrienne Posta; Dan Russell; Bob Saker; Melanie Hudson
- Opening theme: "Anthony Ant" (instrumental)
- Ending theme: "Anthony Ant" (instrumental, reprise)
- Countries of origin: United Kingdom; Canada
- Original language: English
- No. of seasons: 1
- No. of episodes: 26

Production
- Running time: 15 minutes per episode (approx.)
- Production company: HIT Entertainment PLC

Original release
- Network: YTV
- Release: 1 February – 18 April 1999

Anthony Ant is a 1999 children's animated television series based on the book of the same name by Graham Philpot and Lorna Philpot. The series is produced by HIT Entertainment in association with YTV, with animation production by Funbag Animation Studios. The series takes place takes place in "Antville," an underground city where Anthony and his friends must avoid being stepped on by the "Bigfeet" (humans) who live on the surface.

== Characters ==
- Anthony Ant (voiced by Alan Marriott) is the main character who lives with his family who work with the queen, his father and grandfather work in the museum, while he and his friends help solve problems caused by Count Mosquito.
- Count Mosquito (voiced by Bob Saker) is the main antagonist in the programme who often tries to cause chaos with his nephews, the Gnat brothers, he is shown to be the princess's tutor, even though he is a mosquito.
- Miss Weevil (voiced by April Ford) is an anti-hero who often tries to use magic to get others to know her, such as the orb (marble), which was actually Anthony tricking her to wear a pizza pie on her head, which makes her a comic relief character.

== Episodes ==
| No. | Title | Original release date |
|---|---|---|
| 1 | "The Magic Marble" | 1 February 1999 |
| 2 | "A Knight to Remember" | 1 February 1999 |
| 3 | "Rustlemania" | 2 February 1999 |
| 4 | "Anything You Can Do" | 2 February 1999 |
| 5 | "Kid for a Day" | 7 February 1999 |
| 6 | "Dances with Termites" | 7 February 1999 |
| 7 | "The Ant Who would be King" | 8 February 1999 |
| 8 | "It's My Party" | 8 February 1999 |
| 9 | "The Circus" | 14 February 1999 |
| 10 | "The Big Flood" | 14 February 1999 |
| 11 | "Lost and Found" | 21 February 1999 |
| 12 | "Greenhouse Blues" | 21 February 1999 |
| 13 | "The Picnic" | 28 February 1999 |
| 14 | "Race Against Time" | 28 February 1999 |
| 15 | "100 Easy Pieces" | 7 March 1999 |
| 16 | "Raiders of the Lost World" | 7 March 1999 |
| 17 | "The Sceptre of Antebellum" | 14 March 1999 |
| 18 | "Weevil Fever" | 14 March 1999 |
| 19 | "The Great Race" | 21 March 1999 |
| 20 | "The Rescue Party" | 21 March 1999 |
| 21 | "Air Ant" | 28 March 1999 |
| 22 | "Antastic Voyage" | 28 March 1999 |
| 23 | "Walk Like an Egyptian" | 4 April 1999 |
| 24 | "Antarctic Adventure" | 4 April 1999 |
| 25 | "The Treasure is Mine" | 11 April 1999 |
| 26 | "Quest for Sugar" | 11 April 1999 |
