= Gunhill Road =

American rock band

- Also known as: Gun Hill Road
- Origin: Mount Vernon, New York, U.S.
- Genres: Rock; folk rock
- Years active: 1969-1976; 2011; 2014; 2019-present
- Labels: Mercury; Kama Sutra; Wounded Bird Records; CD Baby
- Members: Brian Koonin: Steve Goldrich; Paul Reisch; Michael Harrison
- Past members: Gil Roman; Glenn Leopold; Larry Cullen
- Website: www.gunhillroadmusic.com

Gunhill Road are an American rock band formed in 1969 in Mount Vernon, New York. The band was founded by guitarist Glenn Leopold, pianist Steve Goldrich, and bassist Gil Roman, who was replaced by Paul Reisch in 1973. They are best known for their lone pop hit, "Back When My Hair Was Short", which peaked at number 40 on the U.S. Billboard Hot 100 in June 1973. On the Cash Box Top 100, the song reached number 25, and spent 15 weeks on the chart. It reached number 37 on the Adult Contemporary chart. In Canada, the song reached number 53.

== Career ==
The band released two albums in the 1970s. Their first release, on Mercury Records, was 1971's First Stop, credited to "Gun Hill Road". The second album, Gunhill Road, was released in 1972 and produced by Kenny Rogers. However, the original version of the song "Back When My Hair Was Short" had several references to drugs, and thus was re-recorded with extensive lyric changes and a more up-tempo feel to make it more radio-friendly. The songs "Sailing" and "42nd Street" were also re-recorded, with all the re-recordings done by a different team of producers. When the album was re-released, "Back When My Hair Was Short" became a national hit. The album received positive reviews, and was often featured on many FM and college radio stations. According to Billboard, "Back When My Hair Was Short" had the distinction in 1973 of being top 10 in more different markets at more different times than any other record of that year.

They were long sought after as opening acts, working with George Carlin, Robert Klein, Poco, Harry Chapin, Jim Croce, John Sebastian, Lily Tomlin, Cheech & Chong, Gordon Lightfoot, Soupy Sales, and Bette Midler. In addition, they appeared on American Bandstand, Midnight Special and other TV programs.

On October 24, 2011, the Wounded Bird label reissued the 1973 version of the "Gunhill Road" album on CD with five bonus tracks: The non-LP tracks "Ford Desoto Cadillac" and "We Can't Ride The Roller Coaster Anymore", and the original 1972 versions of "Sailing", "42nd Street" and "Back When My Hair Was Short".

On November 4, 2011, Glenn Leopold, Paul Reisch and Steven Goldrich reunited for the first time since 1976 to perform at a benefit in Montclair, N.J. to feed the homeless, and honor their former manager and longtime Bitter End owner Paul Colby.

In October 2014, they returned to the Bitter End to perform for the first time in 40 years. Also in 2014, the group self-released their first album since 1973, aptly titled Every 40 Years. In 2017, a documentary film of the same name was released, detailing the band's history and reunion.

In 2019, they started recording their fourth album, What Year Is This, although its release was postponed due to the COVID-19 pandemic. This album included the single I Know You're Real.

In 2022, the group started work on a fifth album. With the addition of Brian Koonin and Michael Harrison, the four person group intends to release a 20 track album in the summer of 2026 called But On The Other Hand. On August 19, 2022, the first track from the upcoming album, Idiots, was released, commenting on the state of our national discourse. Further releases with videos attached have been released since then on YouTube, including Keep On Talking, and Artificial Intelligence, both commenting on current affairs.

The band's name comes from a major street located in the northern New York City borough of the Bronx. The street serves as the official border that divides the North Bronx from the South Bronx and is also served by two New York City Subway stops, Gun Hill Road and East Gun Hill Road and one Metro North Railroad station.
