= Bob Forward =

American writer, director and producer

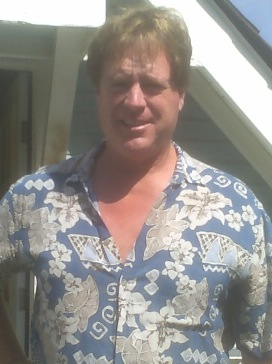
- Forward on April 30, 2007
- Born: Robert D. Forward; 1958 (age 67–68)
- Occupations: Television writer, novelist, film producer, screenwriter, television director
- Website: bobforward.com

Robert D. Forward (born 1958) is an American writer, producer, and director. He is the production director and president of his independent company, Detonation Films. Forward has been the writer of many animated television series, as well as a film, The Owl, based on his novel of the same name, which was republished in 2014.

Forward is the son of Robert L. Forward, who was an American physicist and science fiction writer. His sister is Eve Forward. Forward currently resides in Chatsworth, Los Angeles, California, while Detonation Films is located in Simi Valley, California. Forward is known to have registered at least one patent under his name.

== Filmography ==
=== Writer ===
- series head writer denoted in bold

Year(s)	Title	Notes
1984–1985	He-Man and the Masters of the Universe	
1985	The Secret of the Sword	Television special
1985	He-Man and She-Ra: A Christmas Special	Television special
1985–1987	She-Ra: Princess of Power	
1986	Rambo: The Force of Freedom	
1986	Filmation’s Ghostbusters	
1987–1988	BraveStarr	
1988	BraveStarr: The Movie	
1988	Slimer!	
1988–1989	COPS	
1989	Ring Raiders	
1989	**The Legend of Zelda**	
1990–1992	Captain Planet and the Planeteers	developed by
1991	G.I. Joe: A Real American Hero	
1991	Hammerman	
1992	Super Dave: Daredevil for Hire	
1992	Defenders of Dynatron City	Television pilot
1993	Adventures of Sonic the Hedgehog	
1993	Double Dragon	
1993–1994	**Biker Mice from Mars**	
1993–1994	Exosquad	
1994	Tattooed Teenage Alien Fighters from Beverly Hills	
1994–1995	**Wild C.A.T.s**	
1995	Ultraforce	
1995	Teenage Mutant Ninja Turtles	
1995–1996	**Action Man**	
1996	**The Savage Dragon**	season 2 head writer
1996–1997	The Incredible Hulk	
1996–1999	**Beast Wars: Transformers**	
1997–1999	**Roswell Conspiracies: Aliens, Myths and Legends**	
1998	Young Hercules	
1999	Sonic Underground	
2000	Buzz Lightyear of Star Command	
2000–2003	**X-Men: Evolution**	
2001–2002	Ultimate Book of Spells	
2003	Stargate Infinity	
2005	Teenage Mutant Ninja Turtles	
2005	**Alien Racers**	
2006	Legend of the Dragon	
2006	Zorro: Generation Z	
2006–2007	Fantastic Four: World's Greatest Heroes	
2008	Wolverine and the X-Men	
2009	Transformers: Animated	
2012	Transformers: Rescue Bots	
2013	Pac-Man and the Ghostly Adventures	
2016	Miles from Tomorrowland	
2018	**Kulipari: Dream Walker**	

=== Director ===
Year(s)	Title	Notes
1998	Beast Wars: Transformers	1 episode

=== Producer ===
Year(s)	Title	Notes
1991	The Owl	co-producer

== Novels ==
Forward (writing as Robert D. Forward) is the author of two novels, The Owl (1984) and its sequel The Owl 2 (1990).
