= Mary Healey =

English actress (born 1942)

- Born: Mary Veronica Healey; 9 December 1942 (age 83); Rugby, Warwickshire, England
- Occupation: Actress
- Years active: 1968–present
- Television: Coronation Street; The Royle Family; Foyle's War; Silent Witness; Midsomer Murders; A Touch of Frost; Brookside
- Spouse: Morgan Deare (m. 1989)

Mary Healey (born 9 December 1942) is an English Actor. Her memorable roles are as Mrs Cochrane in The Duchess of Duke Street (1976-1977), Dora in period drama Holding On (1977, based on the novel by Mervyn Jones), Mrs Wilmot in crime drama series King and Castle (1986-1988), Ruth Sweeney in soap opera Brookside (1992 & 1994) and Ida in film Brassed Off (1996).

== Early life ==
Healey was born in Rugby, Warwickshire. Ever since the age of three, she aspired to act. Growing up in Sutton Coldfield, Healey attended High School followed by Art College in Leeds. There, she won national diplomas in design, drawing and painting, believing it would be a good thing to have a second string to her bow.

== Career ==
Following this, Healey went to Nottingham Playhouse, where she spent her first year working backstage before getting acting parts in the second year. Afterwards, it was off to London, making her television debut aged 26, playing the role of Tilda in the 1968 television adaptation of Charles Dickens' Nicholas Nickleby. Between January and February 1977, Healey played the part of Thelma James in ITV soap opera Coronation Street and returned to the programme in December 1990 as Yvonne Pendlebury. She also appeared in a one-off special of The Royle Family which aired in December 2012, playing the role of Philomena.

Healey has appeared in many television drama series and films, including Line of Duty (2017), Houdini & Doyle (2016), The Café (2011–2013) playing Pound Shop Pam, Doctors (2004–2012), Holby City (1999–2009), Law & Order: UK (2009), Midsomer Murders (1998–2008), The Bill (1991–2007), Rosemary & Thyme (2006), Tristram Shandy: A Cock and Bull Story (2005), Heartbeat (1996–2004), Wire in the Blood (2004), Foyle's War (2003), Silent Witness (2002), Where the Heart Is (1999), The Fortunes and Misfortunes of Moll Flanders (1996), A Touch of Frost (1995), Chaplin (1992) playing Mrs Carno alongside Robert Downey Jr., Doctor Who (The Happiness Patrol, 1988) and Z-Cars (1972).

It transpires that Healey voiced the cartoon character Betty Boop in live-action/animated movie Who Framed Roger Rabbit (which also featured her husband) after original voice artiste Mae Questel dropped out. When Starlog stated that Questel was the voice in an article published for the film's release, Mary got in touch to say it was actually her voice, little knowing that the filmmakers had used Questel's voice after all, and Mary's contribution had been dropped (in some early releases of the film, Mary is still credited as Betty Boop). However, Healey would voice Betty Boop in two "One of the All Time Greats" commercials for The Hershey Company.
