= BKN International =

German children's television company

BKN International AG
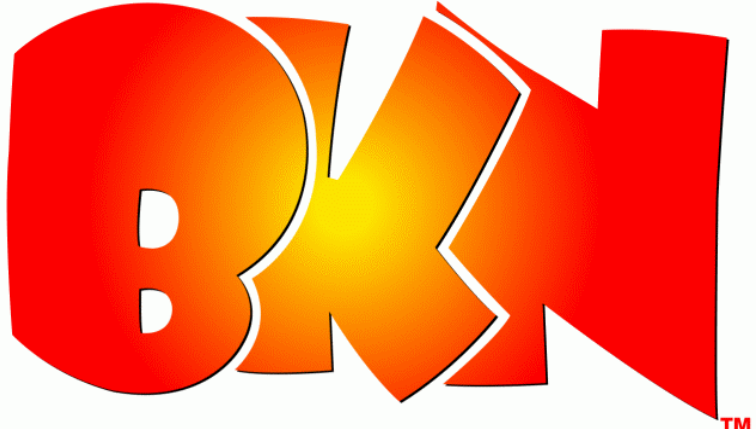
- Type: Aktiengesellschaft
- Industry: Television
- Genre: children's
- Predecessor: BKN, Inc.
- Founded: January 1994; 32 years ago (as Bohbot Entertainment Worldwide); October 1997; 29 years ago (as BKN International); October 15, 1999; 27 years ago (as a stand-alone company)
- Founder: Allen J. Bohbot
- Defunct: October 2009; 17 years ago
- Fate: Insolvency
- Successor: 41 Entertainment
- Headquarters: Cologne, Germany
- Key people: Nadia Nardonnet (President); Allen J. Bohbot (management board chair)
- Production output: animated TV shows
- Parent: BKN, Inc. (1999-2001)
- Divisions: BKN, Inc. BKN Studios (US); BKN New Media Inc. BKN New Media Ltd. BKN New Media Pte. Ltd. BKN New Media SL; BKN Home Entertainment Limited; BKN Home Entertainment Inc.
- Website: bknkids.com at the Wayback Machine (archived May 29, 2002)

BKN International AG (BKNI) was a German kids TV production and distribution company that formerly operated as the international division of BKN, Inc.

== History ==
BKN International was originally founded as Bohbot Entertainment Worldwide in 1994 as part of a split of Bohbot Communications. In October 1997, the company was renamed as BKN International.

On October 15, 1999, BKN International split away as a stand-alone company, with it being registered in Cologne, Germany, on November 26, 1999. In December 1999, BKN, Inc. and BKN International decided to split their business in two, and in exchange for 87.5% of BKN International's common stock. The International distribution, sales, and subsidiaries (e.g., BKN International SAS) and property rights were transferred over, with BKN, Inc. retaining US rights.

On March 9, 2000, BKN International went public on the ‘Neuer Markt’ of the Deutsche Börse AG public market, with BKN, Inc. retaining a 58.194% stake in the company, which was subsequently later reduced to 39.995% and then 37.738% through the rest of the year. On June 8, 2000, BKNI acquired French animation studio Arles Animation and renamed it BKN Studios, beginning the work on a TV movie called Kong: King of Atlantis and cartoon Keystone Kops, later renamed Capertown Cops. By that month, the company was working on projects based on Journey to the Center of the Earth (later renamed as Ultimate Book of Spells) and The Invisible Man. On August 1, BKN purchased UK-based Design Rights International and formed BKN Consumer Products. On September 21, 2000, BKN acquired the international TV, video and merchandising rights for GoodTimes Entertainment's title library. On the same day, the company formed a UK-based subsidiary called BKN New Media. A project based on The Lost Continent and an original IP – The Invisible Private Eye – Detective for Hire was also planned in development.

BKN International in January 2001 acquired BKN, Inc.'s operating assets: BKN animation library (5th largest at the time in the US), Los Angeles–based animation studio, and its trademark for $28.1 million. BKN, Inc. would continue as a holding company with its BKNI holdings. Following the BKN acquisition, Sony Pictures Family Entertainment Group (SPFEG) purchased a 3.8% stake in BKNI from BKN, Inc. as the company expanded into US and Asia. Under the deal, SPFE president Sander Schwartz became a member of the company's supervisory board while Allen Bohbot moved from the advisory board chairmanship to the management board's chairmanship. In September 2001, BKN formed a UK subsidiary called BKN Music, Ltd. in order to control worldwide music rights. On October 6, 2001, BKN International announced the production of a new cartoon called Legend of the Dragon as a co-production with Hong Kong–based studio Animation Enterprises for a 2002 delivery.

In November 2002, the company began a restructuring after being surrounded in a €64 Million debt in the first half of the year, and entirely shuttered their French operations alongside their US and UK operations, only leaving the respective BKN New Media subsidiaries for both regions.

In December 2003, after gaining profits again after the previous year, the company announced to secure a listing on the London Stock Exchange.

On May 4, 2004, BKN announced they would start production on their first feature-length movie - Kong: King of Atlantis and signed a North American home video deal with GoodTimes Entertainment to release the movie for a Fall 2005 release in order to cash-in on Universal Pictures' King Kong remake. An international home video deal with Warner Home Video was also announced. On May 27, the company announced a new television series called Ali Baba and the Forty Thieves: The Lost Scimitar of Arabia for a Fall 2005 delivery. In the middle of 2004, the company opened up a BKN New Media office in Singapore and signed a €1.3 million representation agreement with Hong Kong–based management company Agogo Corporation to represent its Asian-exclusive lineup alongside the BKN catalog.

In January 2005, The Ali Baba project was reworked as a feature-length film, with BKN signing a deal with the Egyptian Media Production City to co-produce the movie and distribute it in the Middle East. In May, the company announced the development of two new action-packed shows - Shanghai Tiger, a boys property, and Triple Threat from Outer Space, a girls property. The latter show was later renamed to Dork Hunters from Outer Space near the end of the year. In October 2005, BKN New Media Inc. agreed to a $10 million outsourcing partnership with UTV Toons of India. after an initial partnership a month prior to produce a new TV series titled Kong: The Next Generation and fellow movie Kong II: Return to the Jungle for a 2006 delivery, alongside distribution of other BKN properties in the region.

On January 6, 2006, BKN opened up a BKN New Media office in Barcelona, Spain in order to control assets in the country, alongside Portugal, Italy, France, and Latin America. On January 19, the company formed a new sub-division called BKN Home Entertainment for the United Kingdom and the United States, in order to distribute and market their products onto the DVD market. Alongside the already announced Ali Baba and the Forty Thieves and Kong: Return to the Jungle, BKN also confirmed to be producing direct-to-video material based on public domain works, which included A Christmas Carol, Robin Hood, Jungle Book, Jack and the Beanstalk, The Prince and the Pauper, The Three Musketeers, Gulliver's Travels, Alice in Wonderland, and The Nutcracker, as well as already-existing shows like Legend of the Dragon, Kong – The Animated Series. and Dork Hunters from Outer Space. BKN also confirmed they would self-distribute in the United Kingdom, and partner up with other distributors in the United States. On February 7, 2006, BKN signed a deal with Zorro Productions for the production of a new Zorro television series titled Zorro: Generation Z. with a delivery of 26 episodes aimed for delivery in 2007. The deal also included the production of direct-to-video movie (Later named as Zorro: Return to the Future) and an addition of 13 more episodes if needed.

In 2007, the company revealed several DVD releases of their content in the UK and North America.

On May 15, 2008, BKN announced the production of two new films for a DVD release that year – Zorro and Scarlet Whip – Revealed!, and Dork Hunters and the Pirates of Tortuga Island. On October 10, the company announced they had signed a co-pro agreement with Canadian studio Huminah Huminah Animation to produce a new series called Pocket Penguin Adventures for a Spring and Fall 2010 delivery.

In January 2009, BKNI was involved in talks to buy Entertainment Rights. On May 28, the company announced a new 2D/3D animated series called Joshua Blake: The Legacy in co-production with Huminah Huminah Animation, for a Spring 2011 delivery date. In the middle of the year, the company delisted from the London stock exchange while remaining on the Deutsche Bourse.

In mid-year, BKN International filed for insolvency and began its sale of its assets in December 2009. By the beginning of January 2010, over twenty companies were in the talks of purchasing the company's assets. In October 2011, it was announced that Cyprus based management company Emba Media Management International Ltd (EMBA Media Associates) had acquired BKN International's former assets. At the same time, they announced a distribution deal with Your Family Entertainment to represent the ex-BKN library in 24 European countries.

In July 2010, Allen Bohbot started up a new company, 41 Entertainment. 41 currently holds distribution rights to the BKN catalogue, and from 2018 to 2022 held it under BKN Entertainment, a subsidiary founded to hold these rights. However, EMBA Media Associates remains the sole-owner of these programmes.

== Programming Library ==
=== Shows ===
- Capertown Cops (2001)
- Kong: The Animated Series (2001)
- Ultimate Book of Spells (2001–2002)
- Legend of the Dragon (2005)
- Zorro: Generation Z (2006)
- Dork Hunters from Outer Space (2008)
- Stone Age (2008)

=== Cancelled Shows ===
- BKN's The Invisible Man (2001)
- BKN's The Lost Continent (2001)
- The Invisible Private Eye – Detective for Hire (2001)
- Shanghai Tiger (2006)
- Pocket Penguins (2010)
- Joshua Blake: The Agency (2011)

=== Asian-distributed Shows ===
- Mona the Vampire (1999)
- Iron Nose: The Mysterious Knight (2000)
- Girlstuff/Boystuff (2002)
- The Berenstain Bears (2003)
- Moby Dick
- Jacques Cousteau’s Ocean Tales
- Kitou
- Howdi Gaudi

=== Movies ===
- Kong: King of Atlantis (2004)
- Ali Baba and the Forty Thieves: The Lost Scimitar of Arabia (2005)
- A Christmas Carol: Scrooge's Ghostly Tale (2006)
- Kong: Return to the Jungle (2006)
- Zorro: Return to the Future (2006)
- Jungle Book: Rikki-Tikki-Tavi to the Rescue (2006)
- Alice in Wonderland: What's the Matter with Hatter? (2007)
- Robin Hood: Quest for the King (2007)
- The Prince and the Pauper: Double Trouble (2007)
- The Three Musketeers: Saving the Crown (2007)
- Zorro and Scarlet Whip: Revealed! (2009)
- Dork Hunters and the Pirates of Tortuga Island (2010)

==== Cancelled Movies ====
- Jack and the Beanstalk
- Gulliver's Travels
- The Nutcracker
