= The Town Santa Forgot =

1993 animated TV special

- Based on: Jeremy Creek by Charmaine Severson
- Teleplay by: Glenn Leopold
- Directed by: Robert Alvarez
- Voices of: Dick Van Dyke; Miko Hughes; Hal Smith; Ashley Johnson
- Music by: John Debney
- Country of origin: United States

Production
- Executive producer: David Kirschner
- Producer: Davis Doi
- Production company: Hanna-Barbera Cartoons (Note: Animation outsourced to Wang Film Productions)

Original release
- Network: NBC
- Release: December 3, 1993

The Town Santa Forgot is a 1993 animated American Christmas television special produced by Hanna-Barbera, narrated by Dick Van Dyke and originally broadcast on NBC. It is an adaptation of the poem Jeremy Creek, written by Charmaine Severson. It was frequently shown in Christmas marathons on Cartoon Network until 2005, and on Boomerang until 2020. It returned to MeTV Toons in 2025.

== Plot ==
On a snowy Christmas Eve, a pair of anxious young children eagerly anticipate the arrival of Santa Claus and the gifts that they will be receiving. Taking notice of this, their grandfather narrates a poetic fable with the intentions of educating them on the true nature of the holidays.

The tale details the life of an outrageously overindulged, bratty 5-year-old named Jeremy Creek, whom, in his youth, is excessively spoiled by his mild and intimidated parents, flinging himself into destructive and violent temper tantrums when his demands are not met. After his parents decide to stand their ground by refusing to indulge their son any longer after hearing reports from their neighbors and seeing a huge crack in the wall, an infuriated Jeremy, recalling the upcoming Christmas season, decides to write Santa Claus a lengthy and demanding wish list consisting of all the presents that he does not yet own. However, when Santa receives the massive list, he assumes that it was written on behalf of multiple people. He discovers an impoverished swamp town coincidentally named "Jeremy Creek" on his map, and realizing he has never delivered them presents before, resolves to make up for his prior absences.

On Christmas morning, Jeremy is crestfallen to discover there are no gifts for him beneath the Christmas tree, and catches sight of a news broadcast with his parents detailing the joy of the penniless and bedraggled children of the town Jeremy Creek upon receiving the countless presents from Santa. While initially furious, Jeremy himself is touched by the joy brought to the less fortunate through his own greed inadvertently, and his self-absorption is dissolved upon the realization of the true meaning of Christmas. Santa also visits Jeremy to apologize for the mistake, and in recognition of his newfound selflessness, Santa offers him the opportunity to help him deliver gifts every Christmas Eve. Jeremy agrees, giving away many of his own toys, and continues to aid Santa until he grows too big to fit in the sleigh.

The elderly gentleman concludes the story by explaining that Santa selects new assistants like Jeremy every few years. The grandchildren, taking the story to heart, are no longer quite as concerned with toys. As the special concludes, the two grandchildren ponder if one of them could be Santa's assistant, and the grandfather muses the same could be true of him, as the name on his mailbox reveals that the grandpa is actually Jeremy himself.

== Cast ==
- Dick Van Dyke - Narrator / Jeremy Creek
  - Miko Hughes - Young Jeremy Creek
- Troy Davidson - Grandson
- Julie Dees - Additional Voices
- Haven Hartman - Little Swamp Girl
- Ashley Johnson - Granddaughter
- Melinda Peterson - Mrs. Holly Creek
- Philip Proctor - Mr. Junior Creek
- Neil Ross - Pout the Elf
- Hal Smith - Santa Claus
- B.J. Ward - Neighbor
- Paul Williams - Pomp the Elf
- Kevin Clash - an Elf

== Crew ==
- Gordon Hunt - Recording Director
- Jill Ziegenhagen - Talent Coordinator
- Kris Zimmerman - Animation Casting Director
- Ruben Chavez - Background Painter

== Home media ==
The special was released on VHS by Turner Home Entertainment under the Cartoon Network Video label in 1996 and featured on In2TV in 2006. On July 31, 2012, Warner Home Video released Hanna-Barbera Christmas Classics Collection on DVD in region 1 via their Warner Archive Collection. This is a Manufacture-on-Demand (MOD) release, available exclusively through Warner's online store and only in the US. This collection features a trilogy of Christmas specials: The Town That Santa Forgot, Casper's First Christmas and A Christmas Story.

=== VHS release dates ===
- September 24, 1996 (Turner Home Entertainment/Cartoon Network Video)
- September 29, 1998 (Warner Home Video/Cartoon Network Video)
- November 2, 1999 (Warner Home Video/Cartoon Network Video)
- October 31, 2000 (Warner Home Video)
- October 16, 2001 (Warner Home Video)

=== DVD release date ===
- July 31, 2012 (Warner Home Video/Warner Archive)
