= Morgan Deare =

American actor (born 1945)

- Born: Morgan Kelly Deare; 19 November 1945 (age 80); New Iberia, Louisiana, U.S.
- Years active: 1977–present
- Spouse(s): Sally Gosselin (m. 1977, divorced) Mary Healey (m. 1989)

Morgan Kelly Deare (born 19 November 1945) is an American actor who works in film, television and theatre and is based in London.

== Early life and education ==
Deare was born to a family who ran a combined bowling alley, bar and dance hall appropriately named Deare's. In his youth, he obtained many awards for graduation, such as the American Legion Award at New Iberia High School in 1963, where he was president of the Civics Club and editor of the school newspaper. The following year, he was initiated at social college fraternity Tau Kappa Epsilon (TKE). Deare received a diploma for Bachelor of Arts at Centenary College in 1967.

== Career ==
Wanting to become a singer, Deare spent some time in the church choir followed by being in Centenary College chorus. However, he never considered entering showbusiness, so decided to make a contribution in the service profession. Therefore, he ended up as a 'token white' teacher at an all black school in New Iberia, teaching maths, English, history and drama to 10-year-olds.

Continuing his teaching career, Deare moved to Saudi Arabia in 1973, educating ex-patriot children of the employees of a pipeline company. Staying for two years, he met many English people and began holidaying in the United Kingdom, eventually being enticed there. Moving to London in 1975 initially for six months as an English teacher and finding a job in a private language school, Deare ended up staying.

He began his acting career when he was invited by a couple of people to appear in A Kurt Weill Cabaret around 1977, his theatre debut. After working at the London Fringe, as well as singing and performing in cabaret, Deare was asked to perform in a 1981–82 tour of Annie. Six months into the tour, he was finally able to obtain his Equity card. Subsequent theatre work has included numerous performances in the West End, as well as tours of Fiddler on the Roof, It's a Wonderful Life, Carousel and Being Tommy Cooper. Being a good singer has enabled Deare to apply this talent in a number of these productions.

Deare made his screen debut in the 1980 short film The Tumour Principle as a minor character. This was followed by television appearances in Deep State, The Bill, The Ruth Rendell Mysteries, Coronation Street, Jeeves and Wooster and Wing and a Prayer. He appeared as Hawk in the 1987 serial of Doctor Who, Delta and the Bannermen alongside Stubby Kaye as Weismuller. Three decades later, he appeared as Arthur in the eleventh series episode "Rosa".

In the world of animation, Deare voiced Mayor Martinez in the animated series Zorro: Generation Z, which lasted for 26 episodes. His voice has been heard on numerous commercials, radio plays (notably as Captain Andy in a 2011 BBC Radio 4 dramatisation of Show Boat), promos for Channel 5 and even dubbing presenter Melvyn Bragg for the American airing of The South Bank Show.

On the big screen, Deare appeared as an editor, as well as voicing Bongo the Gorilla in the 1988 film Who Framed Roger Rabbit, featuring Bob Hoskins and Christopher Lloyd (and being reunited with Delta co-star Stubby Kaye). He also appeared as Donald Hunt in the critically acclaimed 1996 action spy film Mission: Impossible, featuring Tom Cruise and Jon Voight. Other film appearances include Hyde Park on Hudson, Santa Claus: The Movie, Scream for Help, United 93, The Callback Queen and Wild Oats.

== Filmography ==
=== Film ===
Year	Title	Role	Notes
1980	The Tumour Principle		Short film
1984	Scream for Help	Mr. Peacock (School Principal)	
1985	Santa Claus: The Movie	BZ's Lawyer	Uncredited
1988	Who Framed Roger Rabbit	Editor / Bongo the Gorilla (voice)	
1996	Mission: Impossible	Donald Hunt	
2006	United 93	Cleveland Supervisor	
2012	Hyde Park on Hudson	Plumber	
2013	The Callback Queen	Horatio King	
2016	Wild Oats	Greg	Credited as Morgan Kelley Deare
2019	Queen Marie of Romania	Nestor Cromwell	

=== Television ===
Year	Title	Role	Notes
1987	Doctor Who	Hawk	3 episodes: "Delta and the Bannermen"
1990	The Bill	American Tourist	Episode: "Street Smart"
1992	Jeeves and Wooster	Taxi Driver	Episode: "Safety in New York (or, Bertie Sets Sail)"
1995	Coronation Street	Brad Martin	Episode: "#1.3836"
2006	Zorro: Generation Z	Mayor Horace Martinez (voice)	26 episodes
2018	Deep State	Board Member #2	Episode: "Blood in the Sand"
2018	Doctor Who	Arthur	Episode: "Rosa"

=== Video games ===
Year	Title	Role	Notes
2008	Mirror's Edge	Travis Burfield (voice)	
