= Sony Pictures Family Entertainment Group =

- Type: Division
- Industry: Entertainment
- Predecessor: Columbia TriStar Television Children's Programming
- Founded: February 1999; 27 years ago
- Founder: Sony Pictures Entertainment
- Fate: Inactive/dormant
- Areas served: Worldwide
- Products: Feature films Television shows
- Parent: Sony Pictures Entertainment (1999–2001); Columbia TriStar Domestic Television (2001–2002); Sony Pictures Television (2002–2003)
- Website: sonypictures.com/tv/kids at the Wayback Machine (archived 2002-06-06)

Sony Pictures Family Entertainment Group (also known as Sony Pictures Family Entertainment) was an American and global company that was established in February 1999 by Sony Pictures Entertainment that handles all of the family programs and films by Sony Pictures. It was formalized on September 1, 1999.

On January 17, 2001, Sony Pictures Family Entertainment Group acquired 3.8% in BKN International.

On June 20, 2007, Sony Wonder, the former kids label division of Sony BMG Music Entertainment, was moved to Sony Pictures Home Entertainment as the kids and family entertainment label. Steve Okin, the vice president of Sony Wonder, was named vice president of family entertainment.

== List of programs ==
The following series are listed for this group:

- Jeannie (1973–1975)
- Partridge Family 2200 A.D. (1974)
- The Real Ghostbusters (1986–1991)
- Dinosaucers (1987)
- The Karate Kid: The Animated Series (1989)
- Beakman's World (1992–1998)
- The Adventures of Hyperman (1995–1996)
- Jumanji: The Animated Series (1996–1999)
- Project G.e.e.K.e.R. (1996)
- Extreme Ghostbusters (1997)
- Wheel 2000 (1997–1998)
- Men in Black: The Series (1997–2001)
- Channel Umptee-3 (1997)
- Jep! (1998)
- Godzilla: The Series (1998–2000)
- Roughnecks: Starship Troopers Chronicles (1999–2000)
- Big Guy and the Rusty the Boy Robot (1999–2001)
- Dragon Tales (1999–2005)
- Max Steel (2000–2002)
- Jackie Chan Adventures (2000–2005)
- Alienators: Evolution Continues (2001–2002)
- Heavy Gear: The Animated Series (2001–2002)
- Harold and the Purple Crayon (2001–2002)
- Phantom Investigators (2002)
- Stuart Little: The Animated Series (2003)
- Spider-Man: The New Animated Series (2003)
