= Alien Racers =

Animated television series

- Genre: Science-fiction
- Created by: Kevin Bloomfield; Geremi Burleigh; MGA Entertainment
- Developed by: Bob Forward
- Written by: Jeremy Anderson Austen Atkinson James W. Bates; Geremi Burleigh; Mark Drop; Bob Forward; Simon Furman; Warren W. M. Greenwood; Phil Harnage; Glenn I. Leopold; Randy Littlejohn; Christy Marx; Matthew J. Peterson; Robert N. Skir; Richard Stanley; Leonard D. Uhley; Philip Walsh; Greg Weisman; Christopher Lee Yost
- Directed by: Davis Doi
- Voices of: Doron Bell Jr.; Garry Chalk; Ian James Corlett; Brian Dobson; Danny McKinnon
- Countries of origin: Canada; United States
- Original language: English
- No. of seasons: 1
- No. of episodes: 26

Production
- Running time: 30 minutes (with commercials)
- Production companies: MGA Entertainment; SD Entertainment; BLT Productions, LTD (Note: A production studio based in Vancouver, Canada.)

Original release
- Network: Fox
- Release: May 7, 2005 – March 2, 2006

Alien Racers is an animated science-fiction action series originally aired on Fox's FoxBox in May 2005. It formerly aired in Canada on Teletoon.

== Plot ==
Xenoc, the heart of the universe, holds the valuable energy source known as Xeno-energy. It has the power to create or destroy. For eons, this cosmic energy gathered and destroyed civilizations until the wisest and oldest species, Zenterrans, managed to land containment chambers on the planet surface, which they built with the help of Fyran mechanics.

Fearing that every race would be warring over the contained energy, the Zenterran Master Khadan issued a contest. Each alien civilization would choose a champion to race for this great power, and whoever controls the most Xeno-energy will decide the fate of the universe. Since the Zenterrans maintain their neutrality, even the Kragnans were welcome to compete.

The Kragnan Empire, a race of fierce crablike creatures who travel in spaceships made of lava and land vehicles made of bones (which they built using knowledge they obtained from the Fyran brains they consumed), have enslaved or eaten half of the universe. They seek more energy for their new generation of eggs.

The protagonist, Ultrox, knows there is more to Xeno-energy than even the Zenterrans know. While studying a planet damaged by Xeno-energy, he notices a Kragnan ship crash-land nearby. He saves its imprisoned occupant, a Fyran boy named Jek, from a squad of Klaw Troopers. Just before he was vaporized by another Kragnan ship, the gangster named Seadrok dropped his space anchor on the ship, thus saving his life. After persuading him by also dropping the N'tal champion G'rog, Ultrox joins the races as Alpheron's champion.

On the planet Krag, the Kragnans, knowing that they can't steal the Xeno-energy or eat the Zenterran brains (when the Kragnan Warlord Zanth ate Undermaster Akhil's father's brain, the power proved so overwhelming that his body exploded), entered one of their warlords, Gnarl, into the races. The Zenterrans created an enforcer from Xeno-energy named Gamekeeper Kytani to enforce the strict set of rules they imposed on the races. During the first race, Jek followed Kommander Necraal, the Kragnan Klaw Trooper who had kidnapped his uncle, until he kidnaps the young Fyran and tells him they ate his uncle's brain. In an attempt to fix the race, Skrash, the lone zombie native to Xenoc, detonated a mountain in the hopes of taking the other racers with it.

After the first race, the Kragnan commander attempts to steal the Command Matrix. But when Ultrox and Khadan warned Necraal of the trap Undermaster Akhil set that would unleash Xeno-energy on the entire Kragan Empire, Undermaster Akhil mind-controlled the Kragnan into springing it. The resulting trap sent destructive streams of Xeno-energy to every Kragnan like Necraal, except Gnarl, who was shielded at the time. Master Khadan explained that the Xeno-energy only wiped out the Kragnans identical to the commander, so because they did not match Necraal's pattern, the Empress and her new breed of eggs were spared. Even though he saved the universe from the threat of the Kragnan Empire, Akhil was executed for his illegal use of mind-control, but promised to return. The Zenterrans continued to hold the races, while Gnarl continued to compete in them in the hopes of winning enough Xenocells to restore his empire's former glory. Meanwhile, Ultrox has to keep winning Xeno-cells for Alpheron as much as possible so he can continue to study Xeno-energy. But because he often neglects the rules and the races to save people, he is often disqualified from races he would otherwise win, and Alpheron's Minister Prime Apex often comes close to replacing him.

As the races progressed, Ultrox discovered that the Xeno-energy was becoming more violent because of the races, and a new more violent and unpredictable form of it called rogue Xeno-energy was steadily growing throughout Xenoc.

== Characters ==
- Ultrox (voiced by Brian Dobson) - Ultrox is a scientist and explorer from the planet Alpheron. When he was born, Xeno-energy destroyed his arms and legs, forcing him to utilize robotic prosthetic limbs. Ultrox spent years studying Xeno-energy with help from the onboard AI of his vehicle/mobile laboratory Vakkon (Voiced by Ian James Corlett). Selected by Minister Prime Apex to compete in the Alien Races, Ultrox (with persuasion from Jek) agreed, finding an opportunity to study the Xeno-energy up close by competing. He always prioritizes saving people over winning races, which often gets him in trouble with his Alpheron sponsors.
- Gnarl (voiced by Brian Drummond) - Gnarl is a warlord of the Kragnan Empire, which had enslaved, devoured, and conquered half of the known universe by the start of the series. He loathes all other racers and any non-Kragnans for that matter. He'll gladly cheat, destroy or attempt to eat anything that stands in his way to achieve his empire's goals. As one would expect from a warrior, Gnarl loves to fight, doesn't know the meaning of compromise, and shows no mercy to others. Gnarl rides in the "Stoneklaw" - an extremely heavy and strongly armed vehicle that well fits Gnarl's ruthless, sadistic combat-oriented driving style, itself a supercharged version of a Kragnan vehicle called a Landkrab. However, while it has proved its prowess in combat, its speed leaves much to be desired and is often outraced by faster vehicles.
- G'rog (voiced by Doron Bell) - G'rog is a N'tal athlete. He is the greatest athlete in the universe who won recognition on six planets. He is also a big fan of Ultrox. His sponsoring product is G'rogade for his organic car, the Battlesynth. When it's a tie in the races, he wants to flip boogers. The result of this is determined by whether it lands "crusty side" or "slimy side" up, like "heads" or "tails" when flipping a coin. Much of the show's humor revolves around G'rog's fondness for snot and boogers.
- Jek (voiced by Danny McKinnon) - A boy genius from the Planet Fyra, home to "one of the most mechanically gifted species in the universe." He and his uncle helped Akhil construct the Xeno-energy control chambers. They were later captured by Kragnans who ate Jek's uncle's brain to absorb his knowledge, but Jek escaped and was rescued by Ultrox. He's been Ultrox's faithful companion and chief mechanic ever since. The young Fyran dreams of being a racer, and occasionally pilots one of the other racers' vehicles, or his own, the 3X-J, in the Alien Races.
- Skrash (voiced by Ian James Corlett) - Skrash is the crazed lone skeletal zombie of Xenoc and pilot of the Flameskull. He is the last member of a long-extinct species that crashed on Xenoc so long ago, even he doesn't remember the details. His body is a natural conduit for Xeno-energy, which keeps him alive. He possesses immortality, invulnerability, cellular regeneration, and tremendous physical strength. He also suffers from insanity. Skrash loves all sorts of destruction, mayhem and foul play. He is very territorial about Xenoc, believing that the whole planet belongs to him and that the Zenterrans and all other species that have come to compete are deliberately trespassing on his home. His goal in entering the races is to win enough Xenocells to get all those uninvited freeloaders "off his planet". He hates everybody equally, and everybody hates him equally back. However, in one episode, when Skrash is banned from a particularly violent race, he shows a more sensitive side when he claims that he enjoys the races and got upset about missing out: "I hate the other racers! That's the point, buggy! The races give me a chance to beat up on 'em!". Skrash is often used for comic relief - much of the show's humor revolves around Skrash, bones, and his afterlife "living".
- Master Khadan (voiced by Dale Wilson) - Master Khadan is the leader of the Zenterrans. Khadan has helped Ultrox on many occasions and sometimes reinstates him in the races after being disqualified for trying to save a life. In the final episode, Khadan was destroyed by Undermaster Akhil, but managed to transfer his consciousness to Xenoc itself and, as a specter, used Xeno-energy to help Ultrox defeat Akhil.
- Undermaster Akhil (voiced by Alessandro Juliani) - Akhil is a Zenterran aide to Master Khadan. Long ago, a Kragnan ate his father's brain (killing them both in the process), causing him to secretly swear revenge against them. His chance came when Kragnan Klaw Trooper Kommander Necraal tried to steal the Xeno-chamber's Command Matrix, which Akhil had booby-trapped. By mind-controlling the Kragnan into activating it, the result destroyed the entire Kragnan race except for Gnarl, the Empress, and her latest batch of eggs. As punishment for his shameful actions, he was "blended" by the Zenterrans (an execution where a rogue Zenterran is merged into the collective). In Heart of Xenoc, Akhil's specter possessed Khadan's Zenterran Helmsman to sabotage the monitor station and take the Heart of Xenoc, a living master control module made of stable Xeno-energy that stabilizes all Xeno-chambers. Using the Heart, Akhil tried to rebuild his body and gain the power of a god. But before this could happen, Ultrox rammed into and dispelled his ghostly body. Akhil tried again by gathering enough rogue Xeno-energy to kill Master Khadan and become a god, but he was again thwarted by Ultrox and Skrash, who banished his specter from the planet.
- Seadrok (voiced by Michael Kopsa) - Seadrok is a powerful gangster and a very rich personality who handles bets people make on the races. His face is not shown for half of the series; at first, only his red eyes and two tentacles are visible. In Backseat Drivers, his true form is revealed; he has bright red scales, green eyes, tentacles for feet and actual hands, like a red hybrid, half-human, half-octopus.
- Okular (voiced by Brian Drummond) - Okular is a mercenary from the Grote Nebula working for Seadrok. Occasionally taking part in the races, he'd sell Xeno-cells to anyone—even the Kragnans. He does not like working with his fellow henchman, Talanna, but is often forced to do so by their employer. Okular is capable of pulling people's eyes out with his wooden club, as well as storing and preserving the eyes in a see-through bag. All of the eyes obey his commands. The only eyeballs he uses are ones that emit sonic waves that can have concussive effects. He briefly stole G'rog's eyeballs and briefly lent Skrash some crazy-looking ones for his empty eye sockets.
- Talanna (voiced by Janyse Jaud) - Talanna is the sole female competitor in the Alien Races, introduced later on in the series. Her species is called the Nthelle, a primitive predatory raptor-like race whose species has only six words in their language, and five of them are about tearing people apart. Her skin texture is like that of a pineapple, and her talons can tear through solid metal. Her weight is unknown since she ripped off the head of the only person to ask. Working as a henchwoman for Seadrok, Talanna is not a woman to be taken lightly.
- Minister Prime Apex (voiced by Michael Dobson) - Minister Prime Apex is the leader of Ultrox's home planet Alpheron. Ultrox's racing vehicle/mobile laboratory, the Vakkon, was funded by his scientific grants. Apex often threatens to repossess the Vakkon and replace Ultrox as a racer for constantly losing races he would otherwise have won if he hadn't been disqualified for saving someone. He insists Ultrox's priority should be winning Xenocells for Alpheron, not saving people.
- Kreff (voiced by Tony Sampson) - The greatest in a new breed of Kragnan commandos spared from Akhil's treachery, able to change his color and turn invisible. The Empress later used a Xenocell to grant him the power to shapeshift into anyone, and he was able to safely consume the brain of the Zenterran technician who gave him the ability. He calls Gnarl his "father".
- Warcoil (voiced by Paul Dobson) - Warcoil is a robotic arms-dealer built by Robocorp. When Dravox told him the Alien Races had dried up the market for Robocorp's weapons, it became Warcoil's goal to sabotage the Alien Races so the universe would return to a state of constant war, making their arms-dealing business profitable again. Warcoil sells weapons to anyone who can afford them. He is powered by a nuclear cell that has a habit of coming back to his body when separated. His inventions include the size-reducing "Kompactor Kannon", a remote control for Ultrox's bionics, and any number of other dangerous and destructive weapons. Warcoil first joined the races after a meeting with Ultrox's old "friend," the mercenary Dravox. Confirming that the races were fostering peace throughout the universe, he set out to make them war again by destroying the races. He tries to kill every racer, but Ultrox especially, since he tried to crack into Warcoil's files and constantly thwarts his plans. After a failed attempt on Khadan's life, Warcoil was banished from the races, and after a fight with Ultrox, he was reduced to a talking head, which Ultrox threw into a trash compactor.
- Gamekeeper Kytani (voiced by Ellie Harvie) - Kytani is a Zenterran born from stable Xeno-energy a few cycles before the races began to be the perfect Gamekeeper, a totally neutral and impartial referee created to enforce the rules of the Alien Races and maintain order in an otherwise violently chaotic game. With her multi-purpose gamekeeper staff, which is capable of creating energy bursts of varying intensities or immobilizing forcefields, as well as giving a countdown at the start of every race, she strictly enforces the rules. Unlike other Zenterrans, she can't mentally switch off her sense of pain; it was one of the abilities Khadan had to forgo when he created her in order to give her the other useful functions she needed as Gamekeeper. A running gag in the series is Kytani disqualifying Ultrox for saving someone during the races, usually her. Deep down, she seems to secretly harbor feelings for Ultrox, though she suppresses these feelings to maintain her impartiality. Kytani once temporarily served as a replacement to the Heart of Xenoc when Akhil stole the original, as she and it were created the same way.
- Dravox (voiced by Garry Chalk) - An Alpheron mercenary who's had dealings with Ultrox and Warcoil, but was double-crossed by both.
- The Helmsman (voiced by Lee Tockar) - An unnamed Zenterran helmsman, and one of Master Khadan's closest subordinates. He spent the second half of the series possessed by the specter of Undermaster Akhil, who used his mind control powers to force the Helmsman to do his bidding against his will.
- Sportscaster (voiced by Trevor Devall) - An N'tal sportscaster, often heard narrating the Alien Races to an eager audience. He has a habit of recapping previously shown events and information, perhaps a method of padding out the episodes.
- Kommander Necraal (voiced by Lee Tockar) - The Kragnan Kommander who captured Jek and his late uncle. During the three-part pilot, he attempted to steal the Zenterrans' Xeno-energy Command Matrix, but in doing so triggered a booby-trap secretly put in place by Undermaster Akhil and Jek's uncle which wiped out himself and most of the Kragnan race.
- Ambassador Fyrik (voiced by Samuel Vincent) - An annoying red N'tal ambassador who's always sending G'rog "racing tips". The Kragnan Empress once attempted to eat his brain but was thwarted by Okular.
- Kragnan Empress (voiced by Pam Hyatt) - The ruler of the Kragnan Empire, who single-handedly laid the eggs from which hatched an entire new breed of Kragnan warriors, and likely progenated all other Kragnans as well. She rules with an iron fist, and selected Gnarl as the Kragnans' competitor in the Alien Races against his wishes, now hoping he can win enough Xenocells to restore their Empire to its former glory. She keeps the punctured skull of Akhil's father in her lair as a reminder that Zenterran brains are too powerful to consume.

== Vehicles ==
- Stoneklaw
- Battlesynth
- Vakkon
- Flameskull

== Xeno-energy ==
This violent energy is the lifeblood of Xenoc. For eons, it destroyed civilization after civilization until the Zenterrans contained it. It also keeps the planet's lone native inhabitant, Skrash, alive. The Zenterrans, with help from Jek's kind, built chambers with Command Matrixes to contain the energy. The equations were so complex that only the Zenterrans knew how to access it. In Powershift Part 2, Ultrox discovered that the Xeno-energy was containing itself in the Xeno-boosters, which is a result of the active Command Matrix equations. He said Xeno-energy it isn't alive, but it tries to be.

Xeno-boosters
Small disc-shaped scanners containing a small amount of xeno-energy that powers anything it touches. It turbo-charged anything it's used on for ten seconds. The Zenterrans retrieve all the unused ones at the end of the races.

Xenocells
A Xenocell is a capsule containing a large amount of stable Xenoenergy that is presented to the winner of each race. Unfortunately, they are difficult to use, so the Zenterran have to send a technician to help the winning planet make use of them. Once he complete his task, the technician reports back to Master Khadan, except when he gave Kreff shapeshifting abilities, after which Kreff devoured his brain and returned to Khadan disguised as the technician.

== Episode list ==
- 00 - Power Shart, Neutral
- 01 - Power Shift, First Gear
- 02 - Power Shift, Second Gear
- 03 - Power Shift, Third Gear
- 04 - The Lizard of Odds
- 05 - Chez Skrash
- 06 - Malfunction
- 07 - Chaos Theory
- 08 - Nobody Bets on a Kragnan
- 09 - Backseat Drivers
- 10 - Ain't No Justice: written by Christy Marx and Randy Littlejohn
- 11 - Skrash and Burn
- 12 - Speedshifter
- 13 - Heart of Xenoc
- 14 - Hit the Road, Jek
- 15 - At Any Price
- 16 - The Slippery Slope
- 17 - Power Play
- 18 - Action Figures
- 19 - Gamekeeper Kytani Has Left the Field
- 20 - Fungus Humongous
- 21 - Future Imperfect: written by Christy Marx and Randy Littlejohn
- 22 - Tainted Gold
- 23 - These Arms of Mine
- 24 - Rise of the Undermaster: The Beginning
- 25 - Rise of the Undermaster: Part 1
- 26 - Rise of the Undermaster: Part 2
