= Glenn Leopold =

Story editor and writer

- Occupations: Writer, musician
- Years active: 1977–present
- Notable work: CB Bears; The Smurfs; The Pirates of Dark Water; SWAT Kats: The Radical Squadron; Biker Mice from Mars
- Awards: 1994 Emmy nomination for The Town That Santa Forgot

Glenn Leopold is an American writer and musician. He worked for Hanna-Barbera as a story editor, writer, character creator, and show developer. He is also a member of the rock band Gunhill Road.

== Screenwriting credits ==
=== Television ===
- CB Bears (1977)
- Dinky Dog (1978)
- Yogi's Space Race (1978)
- The All-New Popeye Hour (1978-1981)
- Buford and the Galloping Ghost (1979)
- Godzilla (1979)
- The New Fred and Barney Show (1979)
- The New Shmoo (1979)
- Scooby and Scrappy Doo (1979)
- Drak Pack (1980)
- The Flintstone Comedy Show (1980)
- The Smurfs (1981-1989)
- Benji, Zax & the Alien Prince (1983)
- Lucky Luke (1983)
- Shirt Tales (1983)
- The New Scooby and Scrappy-Doo Show (1983-1984)
- Super Friends (1984-1985)
- Pink Panther and Sons (1984-1986)
- Snorks (1985)
- The 13 Ghosts of Scooby-Doo (1985)
- The Jetsons (1985)
- Paw Paws (1986)
- The New Adventures of Jonny Quest (1986)
- Small Wonder (1987)
- Throb (1987)
- Gravedale High (1990)
- The Pirates of Dark Water (1991-1993)
- SWAT Kats: The Radical Squadron (1993-1995)
- Biker Mice from Mars (1995)
- Dumb and Dumber (1995)
- Fantastic Four (1995)
- The Hot Rod Dogs and Cool Car Cats (1995)
- The Real Adventures of Jonny Quest (1996-1997)
- Adventures from the Book of Virtues (1996-1998)
- Doug (1998-1999)
- The New Woody Woodpecker Show (1999-2002)
- Sabrina: The Animated Series (1999)
- Kong: The Animated Series (2000)
- Capertown Cops (2000)
- Mega Babies (2000)
- Ultimate Book of Spells (2001)
- Alien Racers (2005)
- Zorro: Generation Z (2006)
- Biker Mice from Mars (2006-2007)
- Dork Hunters from Outer Space (2008)
- Pac-Man and the Ghostly Adventures (2013)

=== Films ===
- The Prowler (1981)
- Too Scared to Scream (1985)
- Scooby-Doo and the Ghoul School (1988)
- The Adventures of Ronald McDonald: McTreasure Island (1990)
- The Town Santa Forgot (1993)
- A Flintstones Christmas Carol (1994)
- Scooby-Doo! in Arabian Nights (1994)
- Scooby-Doo on Zombie Island (1998)
- Scooby-Doo! and the Witch's Ghost (1999)
- Scooby-Doo and the Alien Invaders (2000)

== As character creator ==
- The Smurfs (Clockwork Smurf, Clockwork Smurfette)
- The Real Adventures of Jonny Quest (Ezekiel Rage) [3]

== Awards ==
Leopold received a 1994 Emmy nomination for The Town that Santa Forgot.

== Music ==
Glenn Leopold was also a member of the American band Gunhill Road, along with Steven Goldrich and Gil Roman. The band is most famous for their 1973 hit single, “Back When My Hair Was Short.”
