= Sean Catherine Derek =

American television producer (born 1953)

Seán Catherine Derek (born October 16, 1953) is an American writer, story editor and television producer. She is the daughter of John Derek and Pati Behrs.

== Early life ==
Sean Catherine Derek is the daughter of John Derek and Pati Behrs. In 1982, Derek wrote an autobiography titled Cast of Characters about her stepmothers (John Derek's wife Bo Derek and his ex-wives Ursula Andress and Linda Evans) and John Derek, with whom she had an unhappy relationship. She also helped Evans write her memoirs in 2011.

Derek is the great-grandniece of Leo Tolstoy.

== Career ==
Derek's screenwriting debut, Foodfight!, was released in 2012. She wrote the script for the fourth Bionicle film, The Legend Reborn. Derek also wrote the ZhuZhu Pets direct-to-video film Quest for Zhu.

Derek worked at Hanna-Barbera Productions as a story editor for series such as The Smurfs and Captain Planet. Derek was also a story editor/writer of Batman: The Animated Series during its first season. She won an Emmy Award for Outstanding Writing in an Animated Program in her work on Batman: The Animated Series.

Derek's other works include Mortal Kombat: Conquest, Mortal Kombat: The Animated Series, Spider-Man: The Animated Series, and Pac-Man and the Ghostly Adventures.
