= Hypernauts =

US television program

- Genre: Action; Science fiction
- Created by: Ron Thornton; Christy Marx
- Starring: See characters
- Country of origin: United States
- No. of seasons: 1
- No. of episodes: 13 (5 unaired)

Production
- Executive producers: Douglas Netter; Ron Thornton; John Copeland
- Running time: About 22 min. per episode
- Production companies: DIC Productions, L.P. Foundation Imaging; Netter Digital Entertainment

Original release
- Release: March 1 – April 13, 1996

Related
- Photon

Hypernauts is a proof of concept show produced by Foundation Imaging and Netter Digital Entertainment. To further prove that the computer-generated imagery and visual effects created in Babylon 5 were easily applied to other venues, the Hypernauts were born. ABC purchased thirteen episodes of the show from DIC Productions, L.P., eight of which ran on Saturday mornings for a single season in 1996 at 10:00 AM. ABC decided not to pick up the series for a second season, and did not air the five remaining episodes. The show was created and produced by Ron Thornton and Douglas Netter, its executive story editor was Christy Marx, who also wrote four episodes. Marx had previously written for both Babylon 5 and Captain Power. Another series writer was Katherine Lawrence who was nominated for a Writers Guild of America Award due to her script for Ice Bound.

== Plot ==
Due to its lineage, Hypernauts featured relatively detailed designs of its technology and its aliens, as well as a fairly intricate plot, especially for a Saturday morning children's series. The premise of the series was that three cadets from the Academy of Galactic Exploration become lost in a Hyper Bubble (hyperspace) mid-jump and must band together with an alien named Kulai in order to survive in an unfamiliar part of the galaxy. Kulai (unbeknownst to the cadets) is a Chalim priestess from a planet called Pyria, a planet that was strip-mined by a warlike race called the Triiad, led by the Pyran traitor, Paiyin. The sole purpose of the Triiad is to wipe out intelligent races, and in the process acquire raw materials from their destroyed planets to continually create new war machines using automated self-replicating factory ships called "Makers".

The Hypernauts, as they are called in the academy, cannot match the Triiad's firepower with their own so they must rely on stealth, wits and (occasionally) their modified "mech suits" in order to escape the Triiad. They are based in an ancient abandoned exploration ship called the Star Ranger which is hidden in an asteroid field. The ship's obsolete AI is named Horten. For long-range missions they use a four-person "jump" ship called the Flapjack which is Hyper Bubble capable but has a short range, unlike a full-fledged exploration ship. They use the Star Ranger as a mother ship (with fusion engines) and with its vast database of explored nearby planets, they continue exploring (as they are trained to).

After learning of the Hypernauts (from their first encounter with Paiyin), the Triiad have activated and englobed the central region of the Milky Way Galaxy in a sensor net called "The Sphere of Interception", which can identify any end-to-end destination point for any hyperspace jump passing in and out of it (which includes any form of communication) so returning/calling home would lead the Triiad directly to Earth. The Hypernauts must keep the location of Earth a secret and somehow try to warn Earth of the Triiad's existence.

== Hypernauts characters ==
The Hypernauts and Kulai

=== Ace ===
Russell 'Ace' Antonov (Glenn Herman) is the team's "ace' pilot who joined to Max and Sharkey on the discipline mission as a punishment for using the Academy of Galactic Exploration's sim trainer to play war games. Ace pilots the team's shuttle known as the "Flapjack" on excursions away from the Star Ranger, and is also the team's best mech pilot.

=== Max ===
Noriko 'Max' Matsuda (Heidi Lucas) is the team medic who was sent on the disciplinary mission that stranded the three Hypernauts because of unauthorized calls to her sister. Legally separated from her family to join the Academy, Max joined the Academy in defiance of the wishes and beliefs of her people, the isolationist and xenophobic Caduceus Enclave.

=== Sharkey ===
Ricardo 'Sharkey' Alvarez (Marc Brandon Daniel) is the team's engineer and computer technician who was placed on the disciplinary mission after hacking into the Academy's mainframe. As a child, Sharkey was injured in an accident that killed his parents. Unresolved trauma from this incident led to Sharkey's claustrophobia.

=== Gloose ===
Gloose is a three legged alien found on a planet decimated by the Triiad and kept as a pet on board the Star Ranger.

=== Horten ===
Horten (Lewis Arquette) is the Star Ranger's discrete AI. He is used to control and monitor the systems of the ship.

=== Kulai ===
Kulai (Carrie Dobro) is the last Chalim (spiritual leader) from Pyrus. She joined the Hypernauts as a friend and mentor due to the help they provided in the conflict with Paiyin. The average Pyran lives about 300 years. Kulai is 342 and has an extended lifespan which is a part of the unique abilities with which she was born and which make her a Chalim, so she will probably live another 200 years. Pyrans share a common psychic bond, a sense of shared existence. The presence of a Chalim generates a critical element of the bond which keeps the race strong, healthy and able to procreate. Without a Chalim, the Pyran race would lack a crucial psychic catalyst. No matter where she is, Kulai can sense whether or not her people continue to exist, and they, to a lesser degree, can sense her existence.

=== Paiyin ===
Paiyin (Ron Campbell) was decreed a traitor after he betrayed his people to the Triiad, and facilitated the destruction of his own homeworld. He now serves the Triiad.

== Episodes ==
The following is a complete list of episode titles for Hypernauts, in original broadcast order. The broadcasts aired on successive Saturday mornings on ABC. Episode descriptions courtesy of Hypernauts On the Net and Christy Marx.com.

No.	Title	Directed by	Written by	Original release date	Prod. code
1	"First Contact"	Leslie B. Hill	Christy Marx	March 1, 1996	101
Max, Ace and Sharkey are accidentally catapulted into the galactic core where they rescue Kulai and the Gloose from Kulai's enemy, Paiyin.
2	"The Star Ranger"	Jim Johnston	Christy Marx	March 9, 1996	102
The kids and Kulai locate a long-abandoned, deep space Earth science station which they make their base. Ace has a very close and dangerous encounter with the Triiad Armada.
3	"Icebound"	Janet Greek	Katherine Lawrence	March 2, 1996	103
The Star Ranger begins to run low on water, so the Hypernauts land on a nearby ice moon where they discover an ancient space craft, and giant heat seeking worms.
4	"Battle at Vekara"	Jon Kroll	Larry DiTillio	March 16, 1996	104
The Hypernauts go to the local trade planet, Vekara, to repair and update the ship and mechsuits after a conflict with the Triiad.
5	"Cloudholm"	Jon Kroll	Richard Mueller	March 23, 1996	105
A low tech world named Cloudholm is in the path of a Triiad prospector probe. The Hypernauts and Kulai attempt to warn the planet's inhabitants the Hokita, who live in gas powered zeppelin platforms.
6	"A Walk in the Garden"	Leslie B. Hill	Len Wein	March 30, 1996	106
The Hypernauts, unwilling to tolerate the processed rations stored on the Star Ranger, land on an earthlike world in order to collect clippings for Max so that she may begin a garden.
7	"Into the Dark So Deep"	Ron Thornton	J. Larry Carroll, David Bennett Carren	April 6, 1996	107
The Hypernauts and Kulai go to rescue survivors of a maker attack. Sharkey learns to confront his fear of enclosed spaces.
8	"Gone to Meet the Maker"	Adam Weissman	J. Larry Carroll, David Bennett Carren	April 13, 1996	108
The Star Ranger is in danger of being discovered when a maker begins to process the asteroid field the station is hiding in.
9	"Reunion"	Christen Harty Schaefer	D.C. Fontana	TBA	109
10	"Hole in the Sky"	Jon Kroll	Larry DiTillio	TBA	110
11	"New Alliances"	Jon Kroll	Katherine Lawrence	TBA	111
12	"The Challenge: Part One"	Adam Weissman	Christy Marx	Unaired	112
Some of the aliens races blame their woes with the Triiad on the Hypernauts. Stung by this, the Hypernauts set out to destroy one of the largest ships in the Triiad fleet in order to prove their worth. While they're making plans, Kulai accepts a secret challenge from Paiyin to a duel of honor. Kulai is taken hostage, but she places herself into a special Chalim trance called the endless sleep that shuts down her mind.
13	"The Challenge: Part Two"	John Vulich	Christy Marx	Unaired	113
The Hypernauts seek the help of the Sacul to get revenge for what has been done to Kulai. They give the Hypernauts a weapon capable of generating power equivalent to a small star. The Hypernauts manage to enter the main Triiad fortress ship and activate the Sacul weapon before escaping. The explosion destroys the fortress, the Triiad aliens and the fleet, Paiyin also escapes. Later Kulai is woken with the aid of a telepath.

== Multimedia ==
Reunion, Hole in the Sky, New Alliances, and the Challenge parts one and two never aired in the United States, but were available on various media in Australia, Japan and Germany. In Japan Hypernauts was released as Voyager on VHS.

== Production credits ==
- Executive Producers: Andy Heyward, Michael Malliani, Robby London
- Story Editors: John Sandford
- Live Action Produced by: Marsha Goodman
- Executive in charge of production: Brain A. Miller
- Cast: Jan Knoots, Marsha Goodman, Jabeel White, Phil Harnage
- International Executive Producers: Jean Chaplon
- Created by: Danny Florman
- Based on the Hypernauts book by Maranget Goodman
