= G.I. Joe Extreme =

Television series

- Type: Action figures
- Company: Kenner
- Country: United States
- Availability: 1995–1997
- Slogan: "Extreme times call for extreme heroes!"

G.I. Joe Extreme is a line of military-themed toys that was sold in retail from 1995 to 1997. The toys were produced by Kenner following their acquisition by former competitor Hasbro and was intended to succeed the G.I. Joe: A Real American Hero line, which was discontinued the previous year. It was supported by a syndicated animated series that ran for two seasons and a series of comics.

The line features a storyline quite similar to the A Real American Hero line. In a "near-future" continuity, a new G.I. Joe Team fights to stop a rising terrorist organization called S.K.A.R. (short for Soldiers of Khaos, Anarchy and Ruin) and their leader, a mysterious, shrewd, and incredibly powerful military leader only known as Iron Klaw.

== Toyline ==
The title logo was reminiscent of the original G.I. Joe logo from the 1960s and 1970s. The 3.75" scale was discarded in favor of a new 5" scale, which allowed a greater level of detail especially in the facial and muscular features.

Carded figures were released in two varieties, basic figures and deluxe figures. The deluxe versions of the figures, which were advertised as featuring "Ultra SLAM Firepower", came packaged with a backpack accessory connected to a missile launcher via a tube. The launcher shoots its missiles by lowering the plunger on the backpack. A single two-pack was also released. The vehicles and playsets were also advertised with "Ultra SLAM Firepower".

The Extreme line never approached the success of the Real American Hero line and was canceled after its first wave. A second wave of figures and playsets was showcased in Toy Fair '96, but only two figures (Black Dragon and Harpoon) were given full releases. The rest, which included Mayday (the sole female Joe in the Extreme lineup), were shelved

The 25th Anniversary G.I. Joe Collector's Club had a figure of Iron Klaw where his bio mentions that it is unknown if he is an enemy or ally of Cobra with S.K.A.R. also being antagonized by G.I. Joe. Steel Raven's figure was also released in the same Collector's Club.

=== Carded figures ===
- Basic figures
  - Lt. Stone
  - Mayday
  - Black Dragon
  - Metalhead
  - Quick Stryke
  - Harpoon
  - Ballistic
  - Sgt. Savage
  - Freight
  - Iron Klaw
  - Inferno
  - Steel Raven
- Deluxe figures
  - Lt. Stone with Mortar Launcher
  - Iron Klaw with Attack Rocket
  - Ballistic with Sidearm Blaster
  - Metal Head with Shoulder Cannon
- Two-pack
  - Lt. Stone vs. Iron Klaw

=== Vehicles and playsets ===
- Heavy Artillery sets
  - Detonator combat cannon with Sgt. Savage figure
  - Spitfire battering platform with Inferno figure
- Vehicles
  - Road Bullet assault cycle
  - Sky Stalker
  - Sand Striker all-terrain vehicle
  - Bone Splitter armored tank

=== Other toys ===
- Die-cast vehicles with Compass - A set of four small scale versions of vehicles from the main toyline. Also came packaged with a compass.
- Water Blaster - A G.I. Joe-themed Super Soaker that straps onto one's arm.

=== Unreleased products ===
- Carded figures
  - Mayday
  - Quick Stryke
  - Rampage
  - Wreckage
  - Deluxe Freight
  - Deluxe Wreckage
  - Urban 4-Pack (included urban-themed repaints of Lt. Stone, Sgt. Savage, Freight and Metal Head)
- Heavy Artillery set
  - Ice Station Zero
- Vehicles
  - Thunderin' Fury tank with Freight
  - Tigerhawk
- Action packs (accessory packs for action figures)
  - Alpine Enforcer
  - Cybernetic Exo-Armor
  - Shadow Stealth Defender
- Other products
  - Carrying Case
  - Combat Communicators (role-playing toy)

== Animated series ==
G.I. Joe Extreme
- Developed by: Michael Edens (season 1); Roger Slifer (season 2)
- Composers: Paul Weinberg; Rusty Andrews; Lee Curreri
- Country of origin: United States
- No. of seasons: 2
- No. of episodes: 26

Production
- Executive producers: Joe Bacall; Tom Griffin; C.J. Kettler
- Running time: 30 minutes
- Production companies: Sunbow Entertainment; Graz Entertainment (season 1); Gunther-Wahl Productions (season 2)

Original release
- Network: First-run syndication
- Release: September 24, 1995 – February 21, 1997

G.I. Joe Extreme is an American animated series that was produced by Sunbow Entertainment (who co-produced the first G.I. Joe TV series), Graz Entertainment and Gunther-Wahl Productions and distributed by Claster Television. The program was part of a checkerboard series of cartoons Claster sold to stations under the umbrella title of The Power Block.

Set in the (at the time) "near future" of 2006, the show's main threat is a new, emerging terrorist organization called S.K.A.R. led by Iron Klaw, disguised as the former count of an eastern European country, whose identity he took over after kidnapping him.

According to the one-minute intro (which resembles a news flash), a "former super-power" has collapsed with several factions vying for control against a new global terrorist organization "known only as S.K.A.R." whose goal is nothing less than total world domination. Iron Klaw claims: "We will be VICTORIOUS!" to which Lt. Stone replies "Not on MY watch!" followed by an introduction to the new Joe roster.

The opening concludes with a news reporter giving odds of survival as "a million to 1" and Stone yelling: "...and that's the way we LIKE it!" Season 1 with a one-minute intro with all of the live-action segments during the beginning of all the episodes, Season 2 with a thirty-second intro during Friday's The Power Block.

The new Joe team operates in a post-Cold War world wracked by chaos and carnage, and battling against both SKAR and independent mercenaries, who seek to further destabilize an already unstable world. Unlike the previous series, the cartoon featured a pre-credits teaser featuring a mixture of both live actors with the voices dubbed over and CGI. However, as with the previous series, the end of the episode featured new public service announcements in the same vein as the popular "Knowing is Half the Battle" PSAs.

=== Episodes ===
==== Season 1 (1995–96) ====
No. overall	No. in season	Title	Directed by	Written by	Original release date
1	1	"A Summoning of Heroes"	Unknown	Buzz Dixon	September 24, 1995
With the mysterious organization SKAR (Soldiers of Kaos, Anarchy, and Ruin) poised to assault Europe, a new team of Joes must be formed to deal with the threats faced in this brave new world.
2	2	"Serious Leg Work"	Unknown	Julia Jane Lewald	October 1, 1995
Mayday is injured and is forced to stay behind to "guard" the Joe's base while the rest of the team is out on a new mission. Iron Klaw sees this as the perfect opportunity to assault the base, dispatching Inferno and a squadron of Skyreens to do just that.
3	3	"Point of Honor"	Unknown	Rick Merwin	October 8, 1995
The Joes are dispatched to claim an old missile silo before SKAR can get there. Lt. Stone opts to send Ballistic, Mayday (who is still injured from the last episode), and the mercenary Quick Stryke on this mission, but just who is Quick Stryke really working for?
4	4	"Chips and a Cold, Cold Drink"	Unknown	Richard Mueller	October 15, 1995
Black Dragon and Metal Head launch a daring strike against SKAR in an attempt to steal a valuable piece of technology. They have to deal with a very upset Rampage who intends to utilize this technology himself in his bid to overthrow Iron Klaw.
5	5	"To Catch a Klaw"	Unknown	Mark Edens	October 22, 1995
After Ballistic, Mayday, and Lt. Stone walk into a trap set by SKAR, the team begins to suspect that Count von Rani may be working for SKAR. Although Clancey, the team's contact, dismisses this immediately, Lt. Stone decides to infiltrate von Rani's castle while Sgt. Savage launches an attack against SKAR forces in order to gauge the Count's reaction.
6	6	"Relics"	Unknown	Matthew Edens	November 5, 1995
When Iron Klaw busts an old Iron Army cryogenics expert out of prison, Sgt. Savage takes it upon himself to see that he is recaptured. Along the way we learn a little about the team's "oldest" member.
7	7	"Dawn's Oily Light"	Unknown	Steve Cuden	November 19, 1995
When SKAR seeks to disrupt the world's oil supply by seizing oil rigs in the Gulf of Mexico, Harpoon, Metal Head, and Black Dragon move to stop them. But when Rampage captures Metal Head and Black Dragon, Harpoon must rely on his Navy SEALs training to rescue his comrades and foil SKAR's latest scheme.
8	8	"Crawling from the Wreckage"	Unknown	Len Wein	December 3, 1995
After a new weapons satellite is downed, it's a race against time for the Joes to beat both Inferno and the super-soldier Wreckage to the scene of the crash.
9	9	"Extend a Helping Klaw"	Unknown	Richard Mueller	December 10, 1995
Rampage creates a new weapon that turns living beings into walking time bombs. When Stone is hit by the weapon defending Count von Rani, help in dispatching Rampage comes from an unlikely source...
10	10	"Now Hear This"	Unknown	Larry Parr	December 17, 1995
When Inferno steals a device that projects subliminal messages called the Mesmerizer, his real aims in life become apparent, as does his life story.
11	11	"Winner Take All"	Unknown	Katherine Lawrence	January 7, 1996
After Metalhead is critically wounded, Freight leaves the Joes and returns to his career in football. Iron Klaw is in the market for a new super soldier.
12	12	"Coup of the Klaw"	Unknown	Matthew Edens	January 14, 1996
Iron Klaw seizes control of the United States and orders the Army to hunt down and eliminate the Joes still on the loose. Despite the fact that the situation seems hopeless, the Joes continue to fight even as the country they knew seems to collapse around them.
13	13	"Rebellion"	Unknown	Mark Edens	January 21, 1996
The Joes continue their efforts to dislodge SKAR from American soil.

==== Season 2 (1996–97) ====
No. overall	No. in season	Title	Directed by	Written by	Original release date
14	1	"SKAR Under Siege"	Unknown	Roger Slifer	September 20, 1996
With Iron Klaw's apparent defeat, SKAR begins to fall to ruin as the Joes try and discover what really happened in Count von Rani's castle the night before.
15	2	"Operation: Underground"	Unknown	Marv Wolfman	September 27, 1996
SKAR recruiting efforts, a mad bomber, and an attempt to get the team disbanded plague the Joes on a very bad day indeed.
16	3	"A Traitor Among Us"	Unknown	Roger Slifer	October 4, 1996
The situation comes to a head when Sgt. Savage accuses Metalhead of treason when the latest in a string of missing security briefings points directly to the computer hacker.
17	4	"Iron Klaw Unmasked"	Unknown	David Anthony Kraft	October 11, 1996
The source of Clancy's erratic behavior is discovered, but is it too late?
18	5	"The Search for Clancy"	Unknown	David Anthony Kraft	October 18, 1996
Now that "Clancy" has been revealed to be Iron Klaw, the search for the real Clancy begins. But what exactly did happen to the team's contact after the failed SKAR invasion of the United States?
19	6	"Sabotage in the Sky"	Unknown	George Bloom	October 25, 1996
A raid on a SKAR research facility reveals links to a large aviation corporation. Stone orders Mayday and Harpoon to infiltrate the company and discover what is going on.
20	7	"The Silencer"	Unknown	Jay Bacal and Lloyd Goldfine	December 20, 1996
The assassin known as The Silencer lures Eagle Eye to his island hideaway to settle an old score. Soon after, Eagle Eye's shooting hand is injured and his vision is impaired by The Silencer as the two men began a nightlong game of cat and mouse.
21	8	"Rampage for President"	Unknown	David Anthony Kraft	December 27, 1996
The leaders of SKAR free Rampage from prison and set him on the path to election as President of the African nation of Comchaka. The Joes become involved and realize that Rampage isn't about to leave the outcome to the electorate.
22	9	"Hard Road Home"	Unknown	Roy Thomas	January 3, 1997
Rogue General Leon Bosch takes an Inter-Alliance peacekeeping effort hostage in a bid to fully seize control of his country. The Joes are dispatched to rescue the team and end the General's reign of terror.
23	10	"Wreckage: Revenge!"	Unknown	Steve Englehart	January 10, 1997
Rampage has organized a gun-running deal, but needs a little muscle in case things get rough. He convinces Wreckage to provide that muscle, promising to reveal Wreckage's origin to him. When things don't turn out as planned, Wreckage ends up on a journey with Freight. Together they discover Wreckage's true origins, helping to free the man who has become a monster.
24	11	"Fear at Fifty Fathoms"	Unknown	David Anthony Kraft	February 7, 1997
After an Air Force fighter squadron disappears in the Bermuda Triangle, Clancy sends the Joes in to find the missing airmen.
25	12	"Metalhead goes A.W.O.L."	Unknown	Roger Slifer	February 14, 1997
Tired of Savage's constant suspicion, Metalhead leaves the Joe Team and goes AWOL.
26	13	"Betrayal"	Unknown	Roger Slifer	February 21, 1997
Metalhead and Iron Klaw plot to further weaken the Joes and the Inter-Alliance by staging a rally for the entire world to see. Matters get worse when Black Dragon is captured and his execution becomes the cornerstone of the event.

== Comics ==
G.I. Joe
- Cover to G.I. Joe #1. Art by Frank Miller.

Publication information
- Publisher: Dark Horse Comics
- First appearance: G.I. Joe #1, Dec. 1995
- Created by: Mike W. Barr, Hasbro

In-story information
- Type of organization: Military unit
- Base(s): G.I. Joe Headquarters

Roster

Dark Horse Comics acquired the G.I. Joe comic license in 1996. The initial four issue mini-series, simply titled G.I. Joe (which featured the tagline "extreme times call for extreme heroes!" on the cover of each issue), was written by Mike W. Barr, with art by Tatsuya Ishida and Scott Reed. The cover to the first issue (The Hour of the Iron Claw) was done by Frank Miller, the second issue (Pawn of the Iron Klaw) by Norm Breyfogle, and issues three (The Gang's All Here) and four (The Ultimate Price) by Walter Simonson. The plot of the mini-series revealed events that occurred after the ones depicted in the television series, but also contradict them on several points, notably in that Iron Klaw is, at the very beginning, the second-in-command of the military wing of S.K.A.R. The original leader was a woman named The Duchess of M'Klavia, who wanted her royal line to regain control of her country's government through whatever means necessary. She was assassinated by Iron Klaw, when he became more ambitious and craved for world domination. At this point, the new Joe Team included two new members, Short Fuze (unrelated to the character of the same codename from the A Real American Hero series) and Tall Sally.

The mini-series led to an ongoing series following the same continuity, and beginning with a three-part story: (Red Scream: Hunted, Red Scream: Shakes Hands with Satan, Red Scream: Island Assault). The plot featured an anti-globalist group led by a woman called Red Scream, who sought to discredit (and eventually destroy) the Inter-Alliance, by using Joe impostors to commit acts of terrorism. The storyline concluded with both Red Scream's and Iron Klaw's capture. A fourth issue (All This and World War II and The Last Wild Heart: The Fourth Man) began a new story following the still-active remnants of the I.R.O.N. Army, but the comic was put on an indefinite "hiatus", and publication never resumed.

== Characters ==
=== G.I. Joe Team ===
- Mr. Clancy (voiced by Campbell Lane) - He is the Joe Team's presidential liaison and the true team leader, very much like General Flagg in the original series. He dresses in a black suit and is always wearing sunglasses, resembling the men in black.
- Lt. Stone (voiced by Garry Chalk) - Field commander. After foiling an attempted kidnapping by S.K.A.R. soldiers, both he and Sgt. Savage were approached by Mr. Clancy to form a new G.I. Joe Team.
- Sgt. Savage (voiced by Michael Dobson) - Master Sergeant Robert S. Savage Jr. was the only character carried over from A Real American Hero, as he was part of the short-lived Sgt. Savage and his Screaming Eagles subline. Savage is the "oldest" member of the team and he once had a wife and child.
- Ballistic/Eagle Eye (voiced by Brian Drummond) - Albert Salviatti is the team's sharp shooter. He has a strong rivalry with his former comrade-in-arms Silencer. Ballistic is referred to as "the guy who never misses". His codename was inexplicably changed to Eagle Eye in Season 2.
- Black Dragon (voiced by Tony Lung in Season 1, Terry Klassen in season 2) - Kang Chi Lee is the Joe Team's resident ninja and martial artist. He is from Hong Kong (as revealed in "The Search for Clancy") and has a history with a crime family from that area. Black Dragon has no connection with the Black Dragon organization.
- Freight (voiced by Blu Mankuma) - Omar Diesel is a former professional football player and the team's demolitions expert. Freight served in the U.S. Army before becoming a football player. He left football when he heard about the reformation of the Joe Team (as seen in "Crawling from the Wreckage" and "Winner Take All").
- Harpoon (voiced by Francisco Trujillo) - Jose Montalvo is a former Navy SEAL and the team's nautical expert (as seen in "Dawn's Oily Light"). He provides comic relief for the G.I. Joe team.
- Mayday (voiced by Randall Carpenter) - Mayday is the lone female of the Lt. Stone's G.I. Joe Team. She is an aggressive and determined skilled fighter and aircraft pilot.
- Metalhead (voiced by Matt Hill) - Matthew Hurley is the team's communications expert and hacker. He was the first person recruited to join the new Joe Team (as seen in "Summoning of Heroes"). He is unrelated to the Iron Grenadier member who was introduced in A Real American Hero line.
- Quick Stryke (voiced by Blu Mankuma) - A former S.K.A.R. operative who defected to the Joe Team after the death of his brother Jonathan (as seen in "Point of Honor").
- Red McKnox (voiced by Dale Wilson) - A scientist of Scottish descent who designed most of the equipment used by the Joe Team.
- Tracker - (voiced by Paul Dobson) - An expert tracker recruited by Stone in order to find Mr. Clancy. Tracker possesses extra-sensory perception (as seen in "The Search for Clancy").
  - Lakota - Tracker's trained wolf.
- Short-Fuze - A member of the Joe Team, appearing only in the comic series. He is an expert in demolitions, unrelated to the original one from A Real American Hero series.
- Tall Sally - A second female character appearing only in the comic series. "Sally" is a nickname short for Salindra.

=== S.K.A.R. ===
- Iron Klaw (voiced by Richard Newman) - The leader of the military wing of S.K.A.R. He has a fascination and deep respect for Genghis Khan (as seen in "Relics", "Rebellion", and "The Search for Clancy"). Iron Klaw operates under the alias of Count von Rani, the ruler of a small Eastern European nation called Kalistan who he kidnapped and stole the identity of.
- Steel Raven (voiced by Elizabeth Carol Savenkoff) - Iron Klaw's right-hand woman, Steel Raven becomes the main instrument of his will by the second season of the TV series.
- Inferno (voiced by Ian James Corlett) - Kidwell Pyre served Iron Klaw throughout the first season of the television series. Inferno grew up as the adopted son of a poor single mother who worked as a maid while his two brothers Miles and Fredwick bullied him at an early age. Refers to his arm-mounted flamethrowers as his "Toys" and talks with a hissing voice.
- Wreckage (voiced by Dale Wilson) - He was once a soldier named Eric Alexander who fought alongside Freight in the American military until he went M.I.A. In reality, Wreckage was experimented upon in an early attempt by Iron Klaw to create a cybernetic super soldier when he was captured during a major military conflict in South America (as seen in "Crawling from the Wreckage"). The experiments made Wreckage extremely strong and resilient, but prone to fits of rage.
- Rampage (voiced by Colin Murdock) - J. Remington III is an arms manufacturer who operates legitimate business fronts and black market deals. Rampage is S.K.A.R.'s primary weapon supplier. However, he seeks to eliminate Iron Klaw and seize control of the organization. Rampage possesses the ability to transform into a grotesque devilish green-skinned creature (as seen in "Crawling from the Wreckage" and "Extend a Helping Klaw"). In addition when he's in battle, he also wears a battle armor with guns on it that often vary from a chain-gun to a rocket launcher.
- Duchess of Mklavia - The former leader of the military wing of S.K.A.R., the Duchess appears only in the first comic series. Iron Klaw assassinated her to replace her as head of both Kalistan and S.K.A.R.
- S.K.A.R. Soldiers - The robotic foot soldiers of S.K.A.R.

=== Non-aligned villains ===
- Silencer (voiced by David Kaye) - Although not technically a member of S.K.A.R., the Silencer is often found in their employ. He is a freelance mercenary known for his expert marksmanship. Silencer used to be a member of the U.S. Special Forces serving with Ballistic/Eagle Eye. However, he was court-martialed for his actions and thrown out of the military.
- Red Scream - Appearing only in the comic series, Red Scream is an anti-globalist terrorist who sought to destroy the Inter-Alliance by discrediting the Joe Team through the use of imposters. Her identity was later revealed to be Commander Roston, an American military officer with access to the Joe Team's files.

== Voices ==
- Randall Carpenter - Mayday
- Garry Chalk - Lt. Stone
- Ian James Corlett - Inferno
- Michael Dobson - Sgt. Savage
- Brian Drummond - Eagle Eye/Ballistic
- Matt Hill - Metalhead
- Terry Klassen - Black Dragon (Season 2)
- Campbell Lane - Mr. Clancy
- Tong Lung - Black Dragon (Season 1)
- Blu Mankuma - Freight, Quick Stryke
- Colin Murdock - Rampage
- Richard Newman - Iron Klaw
- Elizabeth Carol Savenkoff - Steel Raven
- Francisco Trujillo - Harpoon
- Dale Wilson - Red McKnox, Wreckage

=== Additional voices ===
- Kathleen Barr -
- Lisa Ann Beley -
- A.J. Bond -
- Roger Cross -
- John Kirk Connell -
- Paul Dobson - Tracker
- Christopher Gray -
- Saffron Henderson -
- David Kaye - Silencer
- Ken Kramer -
- Kyle Labine -
- Andrea Libman -
- Chris Turner -

== Crew ==
- Susan Blu - Voice Director
