= Tony Christopher =

Anthony Christopher may refer to:

- Tony Christopher, Baron Christopher (1925–2026), British businessman, trade unionist and tax official
- Tony Christopher (American businessman) (born 1952), CEO and president of Landmark Entertainment Group
