= Conquests of the Longbow: The Legend of Robin Hood =

1991 video game

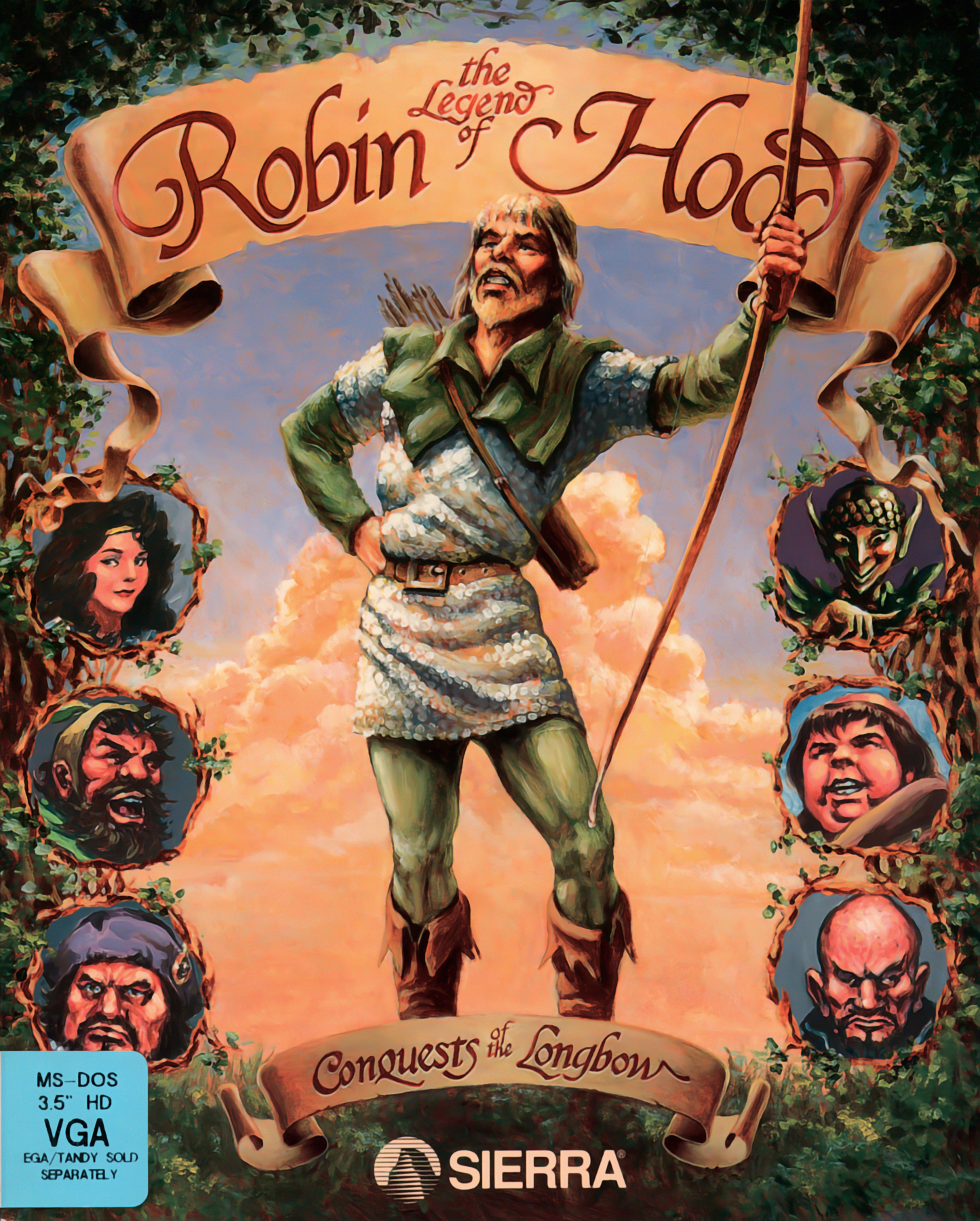
- Developer: Sierra On-Line
- Publisher: Sierra On-Line
- Directors: Christy Marx; Bill Davis (creative)
- Producer: Guruka Singh-Khalsa
- Designer: Christy Marx
- Programmer: Richard Aronson
- Artist: Kenn Nishiuye
- Composer: Mark Seibert
- Platforms: MS-DOS, Amiga, Classic Mac OS
- Release: 1991: MS-DOS; 1992: Amiga; 1992: Mac
- Genre: Adventure
- Mode: Single-player

Conquests of the Longbow: The Legend of Robin Hood is a graphic adventure game designed by Christy Marx and published by Sierra On-Line in 1991. It is the second and final part of the Conquests series, which begins with Conquests of Camelot: The Search for the Grail. It features VGA graphics and Sierra's standard icon-driven interface first seen in King's Quest V.

The player assumes the role of the legendary Robin Hood in his efforts to restore King Richard I to the throne of England. To do so, he must collect enough money to pay the king's ransom while avoiding the efforts of the Sheriff of Nottingham to capture and hang him and all his men.

== Gameplay ==
Most of the game takes place in a standard adventure game mode, in which the player causes an avatar of Robin Hood to walk between screens and interact with characters and objects by clicking on them. For navigation between screens, the game has several hot spots built into a map. There are also minigames involving archery, combat and nine men's morris with adjustable difficulty.

Gameplay is divided into days, each day ending with a cutscene of Robin Hood and his men discussing the plot and the day's events. Each day involves certain actions that must be completed before advancing, though it is possible to leave vital tasks undone, leading to a potentially worse ending.

Like most games of this period, it relies heavily on the player's ability to read instructions and character dialogue and contains almost no voice acting. Several of the puzzles are entirely language-based. Even though Sierra was an American company, the entire game (with some oversights) is written and punctuated using British English conventions.

The game keeps score in three ways: the number of points for puzzles solved, the amount of money collected for King Richard's ransom, and the number of Robin's outlaws who are still alive. There is one opportunity to recruit new members and several chances to get them killed.

Depending on how well the player performs, there are four possible endings. Robin Hood can be hanged for his crimes, given a pardon but no other reward, pardoned and offered a job in the king's service but denied Maid Marian's hand, or he can be granted a noble title and married to Maid Marian.

== Characters ==
- Robin Hood is depicted as a gallant, yellow-bearded woodsman and master of disguise. While the game introduction mentions that Robin was driven into outlawry by corrupt men, it is not established whether he is a commoner or a disinherited nobleman. He is shown as devoted to commoners, women, his king and the Virgin Mary.
- Maid Marian is living a double life as a young noblewoman of Nottingham and pagan forest priestess. Though she sees no conflict between her priestess duties and Christianity, equating the "Virgin Queen of Heaven" with the Virgin Mary, she fears being burned as a witch if she is ever caught. Her primary role in the story is as Robin Hood's love interest and his contact with the Queen Mother's network of spies and loyalists, who are also trying to raise money for King Richard's ransom (the Queen, an unseen character, is Eleanor of Aquitaine). Marian's priestess duties include, among other things, a one-person spiral dance.
- The Sheriff of Nottingham is a slovenly, cruel, and somewhat stupid man. Loyal to Prince John, he works with the Abbot of St. Mary's and the Prior to divert ransom money away from the Queen and ensure that Richard will remain a prisoner.
- The Abbot of St. Mary's is shown as greedy and cunning. He is fond of jewels, young women, and drinking contests.
- Friar Tuck, a curtal friar, is the band's chaplain, treasurer, and chef. Though shown as "fond of food for a holy man" himself, he also shows distaste for laziness and soft living.
- Little John, Will Scarlet, Much the Miller's Son, and Alan-a-Dale are, along with Tuck, Robin Hood's inner circle. Will is the best woodsman. Little John is the strongest. Alan is shown as a troubadour. The game mechanics permits Robin to call John, Scarlet, Much, Alan, and Tuck to discuss strategies with him before most big heists.
- King Richard the Lionheart is shown in the prologue: As he is returning from the crusades, he is captured in Austria and held for a ransom of 100,000 golden marks by King Leopold, which his regent, Price John, refuses to pay.
- The Widow lives in an isolated cottage in Sherwood Forest with her three sons, Hal, Hob and Dicken. She offers the outlaws help in the form of spun wool and advice. She is later revealed to be Marian's predecessor as forest priestess, knowledgeable about tree lore and other subjects.
- The Prior runs a monastery in the fens full of militant monks loyal to Prince John. Though they live a disciplined monastic life, every one of them was a soldier before taking vows. Their weapon of choice is the quarterstaff.
- Fulk is King Richard's jester.
- Lobb the Cobbler is a commoner living in Nottingham. Along with Marian, he is secretly loyal to King Richard and working with the Queen to secure his freedom.
- The Green Man is a powerful forest spirit whose trust Robin must win.
- The Bartender is a veteran of the Crusades, now running the Trip to Jerusalem pub in Nottingham.
- Matilda, the Sheriff's Wife is a plump and shrill woman who is fond of jewels.
- Roger, Giles, and Jack are the three of the Sheriff's guards most often depicted in cutscenes.

== Development ==
Conquests of the Longbow involved considerable historical and cultural research for detail within the story's setting and puzzles. The game manual lists twenty-eight volumes in the bibliography, including Robin Hood by J. C. Holt, The Outlaws of Medieval Legend by Maurice Keen, and The White Goddess by Robert Graves. The manual includes essays by Marx outlining the history of the legend and the approximate dates at which different characters were incorporated into the Robin Hood legend, such as Friar Tuck and Marian in the 15th century. Guy of Gisbourne is mentioned but absent from the game. Other essays cover the tree lore, early British history, and video game piracy.

Mark Seibert served as music director and provided sound effects while Ken Allen, Christopher Braymen, Orpheus Hanley, and Aubrey Hodges supplied synthesized score and sounds.

== Reception ==
Jim Trunzo reviewed The Legend of Robin Hood: Conquests of the Longbow in White Wolf #31 (May/June, 1992) and stated that "Most impressive is the game's diversity. Combat, puzzles, and arcade sequences (set to whatever degree of difficulty you like) all add to the overall feel of the product."

In 1992, Dragon gave the game 5 out of 5 stars. That year Computer Gaming World named it one of the year's top four adventure games.

In a 2009 retrospective review, Adventure Gamers gave it 4.5 stars out of 5; they praised the puzzles, writing, historical research, branching plot and graphics, while criticising unresponsive controls in the action segments, and regarded the game as a classic despite its obscurity relative to other Sierra games.

In 2011, Adventure Gamers named Conquests of the Longbow the 42nd-best adventure game ever released.
