= Captain Power and the Soldiers of the Future =

- The Captain Power title card
- Created by: Gary Goddard; Tony Christopher
- Developed by: Marc Scott Zicree
- Starring: Tim Dunigan; Peter MacNeill; Sven-Ole Thorsen; Maurice Dean Wint; Jessica Steen; David Hemblen
- Countries of origin: Canada; United States
- No. of episodes: 22 (+3 cartoons and compilation TV movie)

Production
- Executive producers: Gary Goddard; Tony Christopher; Douglas Netter
- Producer: Ian McDougall
- Production locations: Toronto, Ontario, Canada
- Running time: approx. 22 minutes
- Production company: Landmark Entertainment Group

Original release
- Network: Syndication
- Release: September 1, 1987 – March 27, 1988

Captain Power and the Soldiers of the Future is a science fiction-action television series, merging live action with animation based on computer-generated images, that ran for 22 episodes in Canadian and American syndication. A toy line was also produced by Mattel, and during each episode there was a segment that included visual and audio material which interacted with the toys. A production of Landmark Entertainment Group, Captain Power and the Soldiers of the Future was created by Gary Goddard and Tony Christopher, and developed by Marc Scott Zicree, with J. Michael Straczynski becoming de facto head writer. Plans to bring the series back, set 28 years after the first series, were announced in July 2016. Goddard Film Group, headed by one of the original series co-creators, Gary Goddard, was one of the development teams working on the new series.

== General plot ==
The storyline is set on Earth in the 22nd century following the Metal Wars, a cybernetic revolt that resulted in the subjugation of the human race by intelligent machines. Captain Jonathan Power and a small group of guerrilla fighters, called the "Soldiers of the Future", oppose the machine forces that dominate Earth.

== Central storyline ==
Each episode began with the following introduction, plus a recap of the storyline:

"Power on". Actor Tim Dunigan, outfitted in his character's full regalia (one of the "Power Suits" of exoskeletal armor that Robert Short Productions created for the show), turned to the camera and delivered this line.

Voiceover artist Brad Crandall:

Captain Power and the Soldiers of the Future

Earth, 2147. The legacy of the Metal Wars, where man fought machines—and machines won.
Bio-Dreads—monstrous creations that hunt down human survivors... and digitize them.
Volcania, center of the Bio-Dread Empire; stronghold and fortress of Lord Dread (David Hemblen), feared ruler of this new order.
But from the fires of the Metal Wars arose a new breed of warrior, born and trained to bring down Lord Dread and his Bio-Dread Empire.
They were "Soldiers of the Future"--mankind's last hope.
Their leader--Captain Jonathan Power (Dunigan), master of the incredible Power Suits, which transform each soldier into a one-man attack force.
Major Matthew 'Hawk' Masterson (Peter MacNeill), fighter in the skies.
Lieutenant Michael 'Tank' Ellis (Sven-Ole Thorsen), ground assault unit.
Sergeant Robert 'Scout' Baker (Maurice Dean Wint), espionage and communications.
And Corporal Jennifer 'Pilot' Chase (Jessica Steen), tactical systems expert.
Together they form the most powerful fighting force in Earth's history.
Their creed: to protect all life. Their promise: to end Lord Dread's rule.

Their name: Captain Power and the Soldiers of the Future!

By the year 2132, advanced robotic soldiers known as "Bio-Mechs" had replaced humans in the armed forces of the world's nations. The existence of Bio-Mechs meant that wars could be fought without significant loss of life, allowing turning war into a nearly harmless battle between machines. A group of scientists, led by Dr. Stuart Gordon Power (Bruce Gray), had begun working on an advanced supercomputer, called OverMind, capable of overriding the control systems which the world's armed forces used to operate the Bio-Mechs, and thus stop them, bringing an end to war. It required an equivalent to human brain patterns to become operational, but Dr. Power's closest associate, Dr. Lyman Taggart (David Hemblen), became impatient with the slow pace of the project and hooked himself up to the system, bringing the supercomputer to operational status.

With the new opportunities offered by the human-machine combination, Taggart becomes obsessed with the precision and "perfection" of machines and convinces himself that merging human consciousness with mechanical bodies is the next step in human evolution. OverMind achieves self-awareness and shares Taggart's beliefs as they take over Bio-Mech armies throughout the world and attack humanity in a conflict known as the Metal Wars.

World governments turn to Dr. Power to find a way to stop Taggart. He develops the "Power Suits", a combination of exoskeletal body armor and advanced weapons and prepares a number of prototypes for testing. Power, however, apparently dies trying to rescue his son Jonathan from Taggart, though Jonathan is convinced that his father is still alive somewhere. Taggart himself is severely wounded, and OverMind saves him by implanting cybernetic mechanisms into his body, eventually calling himself Lord Dread.

By 2147, fifteen years after the Metal Wars broke out, humanity had been largely annihilated by Lord Dread's forces, and those who survive live miserable existences in hiding lest they be discovered by Bio-Mechs and "digitized" as virtual beings within OverMind. Advanced Bio-Mechs called Bio-Dreads and humans loyal to Dread carry out the extermination, as Dread rules from his headquarters in Volcania, somewhere in North America. In episode 8 "And Study War No More", the location of Volcania is announced as being in "sector 9 by 6". The computer map shows its location near the Great Lakes region of North America.

Despite the dire situation, a number of human forces band together and fight the Bio-Dread Empire. One of the leading human resistance groups, Jonathan Power's "Power Team", uses his father's Power Suits to mount attacks on Bio-Dread forces. They stage out of the "Power Base", an abandoned NORAD installation in the Rocky Mountains, and are guided by a supercomputer programmed with Mentor, an artificial intelligence designed by Dr. Power in his own image and voice to guide his son and the group. It is later revealed that there are human resistance groups in other locations.

=== "Project New Order" ===
During the show's only season, there was a story arc involving Project New Order, Lord Dread's plan to eradicate human life and develop his ideal world. The plan consisted of four stages:

- Styx, the release of a powerful toxin into the human population.
- Charon, the creation of an advanced Bio-Dread warrior force.
- Icarus, the construction of a massive orbital platform capable of large-scale digitizing.
- Prometheus, the release of a plasma storm capable of scorching the Earth's surface.

Captain Power's group uses a system of teleportation portals, called "transit gates", both to move quickly around North America and to keep their base's location secret. At the conclusion of the first season, however, Lord Dread breaks the gates' access codes and sends forces to assault the base. Power and most of his team escape the facility, but Corporal Jennifer "Pilot" Chase, a former member of the "Bio-Dread Youth", is trapped and activates the base's self-destruct mechanism, killing herself and the Bio-Dread troops.

J. Michael Straczynski was the writer of the last episode of the series. He commented about Pilot's death, revealing that the scene was inspired by a particularly tragic event in his own past:

"I've never talked about this before—said I was in a thoughtful mood—but I've known several people, friends, who've taken their own lives. In one case, I spoke to her just beforehand. Tried, through the phone lines, to reach her one more time, pull her back from the edge. I couldn't. Years pass. Time comes for me to write the last filmed episode of Power".

He also added:

"Jennifer Chase is going to die, partly of her injuries, partly of her own volition. Part of my life went into that scene, in the way it was constructed, and what was said. And what was not said, what never had the chance to be said, and thus still burns. I knew that, at the crucial moment of that scene, he couldn't be near her, as I wasn't near my friend...it had to be long-distance, hearing but not seeing her, and the terrible pain of arriving too late. I cannot watch that episode without crying. Ever".

=== Proposed second season ===
The second season focuses on an anguished Captain Power neglecting his duties as the leader of the team and obsessed with killing Dread and Locke, the slicer who had betrayed them in the previous season finale, to avenge Pilot's death. Major Hawk would have assumed more leadership roles as Power goes off on his vendetta. Two characters were to have been introduced: Chris "Ranger" O'Connor, a woman who would be Tank's love interest; and Private Chip "TNT" Morrow, a soldier who had appeared in the first season under the name of Andy Jackson.

The plot also covered the team's quest to find "Eden II", a supposed secret human refuge mentioned in the first season, while setting up a base of operations on a facility that was the prototype of the Power Base. Lord Dread would have gained a new mechanical form, as actor David Hemblen was not required back except, perhaps, for voice work. His new army would have consisted of "Hunter-Seeker" troops and a new Warlord-class Bio-Dread called Xenon. Dread would also have gained a new assistant called Morgana II, a machine with the mind of his former lover, who would have proven to be Jonathan Power's mother.

OverMind would have taken a larger role in the war and revealed a hidden agenda: after digitizing all the remaining human beings, it would erase them from existence. Wanting to keep this secret from Dread, the plot would have seen the AI give Soaron secret programming to assassinate Lord Dread in case he suspected anything.

In the recent DVD release, series head writer J. Michael Straczynski reveals that the planned end for the series was Lord Dread learning of OverMind's hidden agenda, and as a result, teaming up with Captain Power to free all of humanity from OverMind.

=== Adult storyline ===
A great majority of the show's storyline was filled with romance and intrigue, which was made for the adults who watched the show with their children. Thus, the story was filled with romantic kisses, sexual innuendo, and occasionally scenes which implied sexual encounters between characters. Mild profanity was also present; "damn" was said on at least one occasion, and Pilot told Blastarr to "go to hell" in response to his order to surrender. In addition, the violent death of one of the major ongoing characters in the series (detailed above) was also an unusual development for a children's series. The inclusion of a "Bio-Dread Youth", which recruited young survivors to Lord Dread's ideals to further advance his agenda, also paralleled fascist regimes.

== Criticism and cancellation ==
Captain Power attempted to appeal to both children and adult audiences, with its dark, post-apocalyptic storyline showing the aftermath of nuclear war and featured allegories on topics such as Nazism. Ultimately, this became the show's undoing. It was seen as too violent for children because of its toys for shooting at the television and live-action violence. Its less mature aspects, such as the title, drove away adult audiences. Other factors contributing to the show's failure included the higher cost of a live-action show (each episode cost an estimated $1 million to produce) compared to the cheaper production costs of a cartoon, as well as the fact that the gameplay between the show and the toys was extremely poor. Poor transmission time-slot choices also contributed to the show's cancellation: it was sold to syndication as opposed to a regular network time-slot, which resulted in some television stations airing it in the 5:00-6:00 AM time-slot on Sunday mornings. The subsequent poor ratings hastened the show's demise. In an article from Starlog #128 written by Marc Shapiro with quotes from one of the writers of the show, Larry DiTillio, there are the following statements:

But for all those noble sentiments, Captain Power, to the public at large, is perceived as just another excuse to sell toys. It is a notion that rubs story editor Larry DiTillio the wrong way.

"We're not writing stories with the idea of turning each episode of Captain Power into a video game", declares DiTillio. But DiTillio, a first season staff writer who became story editor when J. Michael Straczynski (Starlog #111) left the position for a similar post with the revived Twilight Zone, claimed that ramrodding the script side of Captain Power hasn't been easy.

"This show has definitely not made my life easier", chuckles DiTillio. "This is not just another kid's cartoon show. The writing is always to an adult level. There is the interactivity which has been centered mainly in the battle sequences but we aren't in a position of having to write X amount of animation and interactivity into each episode. I want to make it very clear that around here, we're working for the story".

There is a tone of desperation in DiTillio's voice as he defends the writing integrity of Captain Power. It's a desperation resulting from dealing with cliché story submissions that have come streaming in amid the confusion about how childlike or adult Captain Power is. "People are coming in with the same old stories", DiTillio laments. "I'm getting Star Trek, Star Wars and Terminator. If I wanted another Terminator, I would call James Cameron".

Matthew Costello was critical of the show in 1988: "Not only is the 'show' a thirty-minute ad for the toys (as is He-Man and the many other toy-based programs), but Captain Power sets up two classes of viewers — those who have a collection of the toys (which interact with the program during a special five-minute segment), and those who don't".

In a subsequent Starlog article a year after the cancellation, DiTillio cited many reasons for Mattel cutting off the show's funds, resulting in the show's cancellation: "Mattel's tie-in toys didn't sell up to expectations, parents group charges that the show was too violent, and having to shell out Screen Actors Guild and Writers Guild residual payments because Captain Power was live-action".

J. Michael Straczynski commented about the show's cancellation and the planned second season.

Re: Captain Power "...Yeah, that's a show that is an example of what to strive for, and how sometimes good intentions can get derailed. We genuinely wanted to come up with a long-term story, and by and large, we succeeded. The problem was the marketing in front of the show, and the merchandising behind the show...we got killed from both sides".

"There's an entire second season of unproduced CP scripts, story edited by Larry DiTillio, in which he follows up on the arc that I and others established during the first season. You would have found out what Dread became, what happened to Power's mother, where Eden was (and there would be direct contact), what the secret was in Soaron's programming, and so on".

In 1987, Captain Power was one of the targets of anti-toy related children's television advocates who claimed that the series focused on selling children expensive toys for full participation. For British viewing, the BBC and the commercial ITV network as well as its stations gave them thumbs down on the series, so they enabled the British cable channel Super Channel to pick up the series, despite the fact they have lobbying from the distributors, which was set to air beginning in 1988, given by the fact the present climate on Britain over sex, violence and commercialism in programming.

== Action figures and interactive game ==
A line of toys and interactive television games were released by Mattel, whose distributor MTS Entertainment is a subsidiary. Some ships and playsets, when firing at the screen, could interact with various segments of the Saturday morning TV program.

The first interactive toy and game for the series was a toy XT-7 jet with a video cassette. There were three tapes: "Future Force Training", "Bio-Dread Strike Mission", and "Raid On Volcania". The tapes featured live introduction and end segments with the cast of the television show. The actual mission itself was animated and took place in the jet cockpit from the first-person point of view of the pilot/player. Players would hold the toy jet and face the screen. The toy was actually a sort of light gun that responded to signals from the television playing the tape. The toy jet would get points by firing at appropriate targets on the screen and lose points when the sensor on the jet got "hit". Upon reaching zero points, the cockpit would eject automatically. Since the "game" was only a VHS tape, the missions always played out the same way. The toy could also interact with the live action television broadcast in the same manner. Other interactive objects in this series were the "Phantom Stryker" Bio-Dread ship, the "Interlocker Throne" for Lord Dread, which consisted of a stationary tank on a tripod and an optional target viewer that could be taken on and off, and the "Power On" platform, which the user could plug the Captain Power figure into. Whenever the transformation was triggered on screen or the base was fired at by one of the other vehicles, the toy would immediately trigger the "Power On" sequence causing the chest of the figure to glow.

The toys also had the ability to interact with each other, similar to the laser tag toys popular at the time. When played in this way, each toy had a limited number of hit points, but any points earned by playing against the television show increased this total.

In 1988, a second and slightly more scarce series was released. It is unknown whether the Dread Trooper and Dread Commander action figures were ever released: pictures of these figures were shown in the Mattel dealer catalog, but no other photograph of them exists.

== Episodes ==
=== Season 1 ===
No.	Title	No. in prod.	Directed by	Written by	Original release date	Prod. code
1	"Shattered"	02	Mario Philip Azzopardi	Larry DiTillio	September 20, 1987	TBA
Power is lured to a devastated San Francisco ("San-Fran"), where he meets an enigmatic woman from his past.
2	"The Abyss"	03	Mario Azzopardi	J. Michael Straczynski	September 27, 1987	TBA
The team encounters an old general who has been broken by Lord Dread's offensives.
3	"Final Stand"	05	Doug Williams	J. Michael Straczynski	October 4, 1987	TBA
Tank meets another man from the Babylon 5 genetic engineering facility and must confront him when civilian hostages are taken.
4	"Pariah (Note: "Pariah" was the pilot for the series.)"	01	Otta Hanus	Marc Scott Zicree	October 11, 1987	TBA
Hawk rescues a boy pursued by Dread's forces. The team is determined to discover more about the boy's origins, especially when the places he just left become contaminated by a mysterious illness.
5	"A Fire in the Dark"	06	Doug Williams	Marv Wolfman	October 18, 1987	TBA
Lord Dread commissions a blind artist prodigy to create portraits of his ideal world. Power tries to make her understand Lord Dread's deception, especially after Lord Dread threatens to kill her friends.
6	"The Mirror in Darkness"	07	Otta Hanus	Marc Scott Zicree, J. Michael Straczynski	October 25, 1987	TBA
A Captain Power impostor (Canadian-born actor David James Elliott) is on the prowl, searching for human survivors for Soaron to digitize. It is up to the real Captain Power to shut him down and regain the humans' trust.
7	"The Ferryman"	08	Otta Hanus	J. Michael Straczynski	November 1, 1987	TBA
Captain Power obtains information about Charon, one element of Lord Dread's Project New Order, designed to produce a new fleet of Bio Dreads.
n–a	"The Room (Note: These episodes were not produced when the order was cut from 24 episodes to 22 episodes.)"	09	n/a	J. Michael Straczynski (story); Katherine Lawrence (teleplay)	Unaired	not produced
The Power Team discovers entire areas devoid of human life, but find leaflets offering promise of a well-stocked human settlement. Power decides to pose as a refugee to find out more, but the mission takes an unexpected turn.
8	"And Study War No More"	10	Jorge Montesi	Michael Reaves	November 8, 1987	TBA
The Power Team traces strange transmissions to a place called Haven, where non-violence is a way of life. A closer look reveals that the citizens were coerced to work in another Project New Order element codenamed Styx.
9	"The Intruder"	11	Jorge Montesi	Marc Scott Zicree (story); J. Michael Straczynski (story and teleplay)	November 15, 1987	TBA
A former Earth Forces soldier infiltrates the Power Base to present himself as an additional candidate for the Power Team, but his brazenness and the risk of compromising the base angers the group.
10	"Wardogs"	04	George Mendeluk	Larry DiTillio	November 22, 1987	TBA
Hawk tracks a mysterious band of humans and discovers their leader has a link to his past. Meanwhile, Scout and Tank investigate Project New Order, unaware that Dread is manipulating events.
n–a	"The Rose of Yesterday"	12	n/a	Katherine Lawrence	Unaired	not produced
The Bio-Dread Empire orders the destruction of all books. The Power team scramble to save all literary artifacts, but Tank is wounded in an attempt to save a librarian and her collection of antique tomes.
11	"Flame Street"	13	Otta Hanus	J. Michael Straczynski (story); Michael Reaves (teleplay)	November 29, 1987	TBA
Captain Power plugs into the "web" to learn more information about Project New Order, but Lord Dread is aware of his online presence and tries to stop him.
12	"Gemini and Counting"	14	Otta Hanus	J. Michael Straczynski (story); Christy Marx (teleplay)	January 10, 1988	TBA
Pilot uses her past in the BioDread Youth to infiltrate one of the BioDread Empire's medical laboratories to steal a vaccine. The mission is put at risk as she encounters another BioDread Youth who attacks her.
13	"And Madness Shall Reign"	15	Jorge Montesi	Larry DiTillio	January 17, 1988	TBA
Tank goes berserk after he drinks water laced with a psychotic drug. Hawk is assigned to calm him down while the others trace the source of the drug.
14	"Judgement"	16	Jorge Montesi	Larry DiTillio	January 31, 1988	TBA
Pilot and Power successfully fight off Soaron during a desert patrol, but Power's injuries prompt Pilot to leave him behind and seek medical help. A visit to a nearby town goes awry, as its residents recognize Pilot and put her on trial for atrocities she committed on the town during her service with the Dread Youth.
15	"A Summoning of Thunder, Part I"	17	Otta Hanus	J. Michael Straczynski	February 7, 1988	TBA
Captain Power visits his father's grave, where he remembers the origins of the Metal Wars and his father's role in it. Lord Dread, who was once a close friend of Power's father, goes out to find the younger Power.
16	"A Summoning of Thunder, Part II"	18	Otta Hanus	J. Michael Straczynski	February 14, 1988	TBA
Lord Dread's race to find Power triggers his own memories of the Metal Wars and how he and Power's father parted ways. The origins of Soaron are also revealed.
17	"The Eden Road"	19	Ken Girotti	J. Michael Straczynski	February 21, 1988	TBA
The Power Team head to Darktown to meet a courier from Eden II, a secret human refuge often derided as a myth. Determined to prove Eden II's existence, Power tries to coerce more information from the courier, who gives them an orange apparently grown at Eden II's natural gardens.
18	"Freedom One"	20	Aiken Scherberger	J. Michael Straczynski (story); Christy Marx (teleplay)	February 28, 1988	TBA
The East Coast Resistance organizes a meeting of top rebel leaders with the Power Team's help. A traitor puts everything in jeopardy.
19	"New Order, Part I: The Sky Shall Swallow Them"	21	Otta Hanus	Larry DiTillio	March 6, 1988	TBA
Realizing that Lord Dread has completed the Icarus and Prometheus phases of Project New Order, the Power Team assaults the Icarus command station in Volcania and reprogram the satellite to crash on the place in the hope of destroying both programs.
20	"New Order, Part II: The Land Shall Burn Them"	22	Otta Hanus	Larry DiTillio	March 13, 1988	TBA
Despite Soaron's best efforts to stop it, the Icarus satellite crashes into the main structure in Volcania causing extensive damage to the base, but deflector shields minimize the damage to the Prometheus facilities. The Power Team heads back to Volcania to finish the job but Blastarr, a new BioDread Warlord, stands in the way. Power also has a short fight with Lord Dread.
21	"Retribution, Part I"	23	Jorge Montesi	J. Michael Straczynski	March 20, 1988	TBA
Three weeks after the Power Team's disruption of Project New Order, Lord Dread launches a worldwide crackdown against all of humanity. The Soldiers of the Future combat Dread's troops at every possible hotspot and try to save as many people as they can. After being injured during one of the battles, however, Blastarr discovers the Power Team's warpgate capabilities and alerts Lord Dread. Activating his stealth camouflage, Soaron provides Lord Dread with the frequency of the Power Team's warp gate activation code. Concerned that OverMind is corrupting Lackki to watch over him, Lord Dread engineers an accident to dispose of the robot for good.
22	"Retribution, Part II"	24	Jorge Montesi	J. Michael Straczynski	March 27, 1988	TBA
Emboldened with the information given by Soaron, Lord Dread sends Blastarr and a squad of soldiers to ambush the male members of the team as they exit the gate on a Christmas Day patrol, and slip through to the Power Base, where Pilot has to fight off the invaders on her own. In a last act of defiance, she wires the base to self-destruct, but not before sending various equipment and key elements of Mentor (the Power Base's AI matrix, fashioned in the likeness of Power's father) out on a hover-bike for the rest of the team to recover.

=== Season 2 (unproduced) ===
Scripts for a second season were commissioned and written, but the season was never produced. Twenty-two scripts were assigned, but that number was later reduced to 18.

No.	Title	Script No.	Directed by	Written by	Original release date	Prod. code
n–a	"Vendetta, Part I"	01	N/A	Larry DiTillio	Unaired	not produced
Power and his team are on the run after the Power Base is destroyed by Pilot. They take refuge in the Passages to lick their wounds, but Power is consumed by his desire for revenge on Locke, the man responsible for the death of Pilot. His plan ultimately brings him face to face with the new Lord Dread, a cyborg who is now far more machine than man. Also, a woman by the name of Chris "Ranger" O'Connor comes into the picture.
n–a	"Vendetta, Part II"	02	N/A	Larry DiTillio	Unaired	not produced
Power attempts to find and activate a new Power Base, which had been created by his father somewhere within the Arctic Circle, but first they raid a Dread installation for supplies and fuel. Their mission is cut short when the JumpShip is severely damaged and crash lands in a densely forested area in northern Canada.
n–a	"The Archers, Part I: The Order of the Arrow"	03	N/A	Christy Marx	Unaired	not produced
Crashing in the Great Northern Forest, Power and his men are attacked by a phalanx of troopers and then captured by an armed group carrying high tech bows and arrows who call themselves "The Archers". Angry that the JumpShip's crash has destroyed a large amount of prime forest and fearful that the crash will draw Dread's forces into their land in greater numbers, the Archers threaten to kill Power and his team.
n–a	"The Archers, Part II: Visions in Ultraviolet"	04	N/A	Christy Marx	Unaired	not produced
While Power and the team are gaining the trust of the Archers, Dread seeks an alliance the "Baron", a tyrant who attempts to rule the forest people through his use of force. Learning of the unholy alliance, the Power team and the Archers mount a joint recon mission, but the Captain finds himself in great personal danger when his Power Suit runs out of juice as the "clickers" attack.
n–a	"The Archers, Part III: The Willow and the Oak"	05	N/A	Christy Marx	Unaired	not produced
Unable to find Jonathan after his fall from the cliff, the remaining team members go with the Archers to a meeting with a man they call the "Trader". Unbeknownst to his team, Power was rescued from the river by the Trader, who identifies him as being wanted by Dread. Dread sends his newest BioDreads, the "Hunter-Seekers" to attack the rebellious group, who find the new units nearly indestructible. The group manages to escape, but Dread orders them to surrender at once or he will create a plasma storm which will burn everything within a 1000 km radius.
n–a	"The Archers, Part IV: Plasma Storm Raging"	06	N/A	Christy Marx	Unaired	not produced
The Hunter-Seekers begin igniting a plasma storm as ordered while the Power team watches in horror from a distance. Dread vows to destroy the entire forest unless Power surrenders to him. Ignoring the Captain's orders, Hawk attempts to stop the BioDreads from spreading the holocaust, but when his suit's power begins to fail, he is shot out of the sky and falls into the middle of the raging plasma storm.
n–a	"The Archers, Part V: Death and Beyond"	07	N/A	Christy Marx	Unaired	not produced
After finding parts to repair the JumpShip in a raid of the Baron's warehouse, Hawk and Scout struggle to repair the ship while Tank, Chris and the Archers attempt to capture the Baron's laser cannon. Only the cannon has sufficient power to hold off the growing plasma storm, but Dread has too many forces protecting the cannon, so Captain Power draws attention away from it by challenging Dread to a fight to the death.
n–a	"The Observer"	08	N/A	Mark Cassutt	Unaired	not produced
The story deals with a possibly alien race or humans in exile who escaped Earth and are sitting in judgment over what has transpired on Earth. One of these neutral observers of the battle between Power and Dread chooses to align himself with the humans, violating his non-interference directive.
n–a	"The Blood Dimmed Tide, Part I: The Ceremony of Innocence"	14	N/A	Michael Reaves	Unaired	not produced
While attempting to gather more data on Project Rebirth, Captain Power, Tank and Ranger are marooned on a tropical island where the evil Dr Severius is carrying out horrific experiments for Lord Dread, experiments which have created a race of mutants with strange powers. While Jonathan strives to persuade the mutants to ally with the humans struggling for freedom, Hawk, Scout and TNT must hold out against Dread and his forces all by themselves. The title for this three part story arc comes from the poem The Second Coming by William Butler Yeats, which includes the lines: "The blood-dimmed tide is loosed, and everywhere The ceremony of innocence is drowned".
n–a	"The Blood Dimmed Tide, Part II: Tyger, Tyger"	15	N/A	Michael Reaves	Unaired	not produced
While attempting to gather more data on Project Rebirth, Captain Power, Tank and Ranger are marooned on a tropical island where the evil Dr. Severius is carrying out horrific experiments for Lord Dread, experiments which have created a race of mutants with strange powers. While Jonathan strives to persuade the mutants to ally with the humans struggling for freedom, Hawk, Scout and TNT must hold out against Dread and his forces all by themselves. The sub-title for the second part of the story arc is from the poem The Tyger by William Blake, which begins, "Tyger! Tyger! Burning bright".
n–a	"The Blood Dimmed Tide, Part III: Ozymandias"	16	N/A	Michael Reaves	Unaired	not produced
While attempting to gather more data on Project Rebirth, Captain Power, Tank and Ranger are marooned on a tropical island where the evil Dr Severius is carrying out horrific experiments for Lord Dread, experiments which have created a race of mutants with strange powers. While Jonathan strives to persuade the mutants to ally with the humans struggling for freedom, Hawk, Scout and TNT must hold out against Dread and his forces all by themselves. The sub-title for the final chapter of this story arc comes from the poem Ozymandias by Percy Bysshe Shelley, which includes the line, "My name is Ozymandias, king of kings: Look on my works, ye Mighty, and despair!"
n–a	"Face of Darkness"	n/a	N/A	David Bennett Carren, J. Larry Carroll	Unaired	not produced
The Power Team head to the old city of Toronto to try and save the human settlement there being threatened by Dread and his Bio-Dredds. During the rescue operation, Scout comes across a mysterious figure in the tunnels below the city, known only as 'Mindi 7'.
n–a	"A Passion Forged in Steel"	n/a	N/A	Steve Gerber	Unaired	not produced
The Power Team pick up a bunch of refugees after staving off a Dread attack on them. Power suspects a spy amongst the refugees and dispatches Scout to unveil the snitch. Steve Gerber's script introduces the mysterious operative Morgana and sets the tone for her relationship with Lord Dread (featuring the first ever cyber-sex scene in television history, according to Larry DiTillio), with an unexpected twist for Captain Power.
n–a	"Code Name: Ranger"	n/a	N/A	Larry DiTillio	Unaired	not produced
n–a	"Unnamed script 15"	n/a	N/A	n/a	Unaired	not produced
n–a	"Unnamed script 16"	n/a	N/A	n/a	Unaired	not produced
n–a	"Unnamed script 17"	n/a	N/A	n/a	Unaired	not produced
n–a	"Unnamed script 18"	n/a	N/A	n/a	Unaired	not produced

== Characters ==
- Tim Dunigan – Captain Jonathan Power. The son of a prominent scientist who tried to create a special computer to handle all BioMechs around the world, Captain Power leads a band of "Soldiers of the Future", also called "The Power Team", to combat Lord Dread's forces.
- Peter MacNeill – Major Matthew "Hawk" Masterson. A specialist in air operations, Masterson is seen as the team's father figure and was an old friend of Stuart Power.
- Sven-Ole Thorsen – Lieutenant Michael "Tank" Ellis. The genetically engineered "Tank" Ellis is the team's burliest member. He is an expert in heavy weapons and wears a heavily armored power suit.
- Maurice Dean Wint – Sergeant Robert "Scout" Baker. The team's communications expert, who wears a special power suit that can help disguise him as a BioDread Empire trooper or give him other appearances.
- Jessica Steen – Corporal Jennifer "Pilot" Chase. A former BioDread Youth member and the only female Soldier of the Future, Chase helms the Jump-Ship, an armored personnel carrier that serves as the group's primary aircraft, and atop which Power's personal aircraft, the XT-7 PowerJet, is docked when not in use. She and Power have a mutual attraction that is not resolved with her death in the season finale.
- David Hemblen – Lord Dread/Dr. Lyman Taggart. A world-renowned expert in artificial intelligence, Taggart became Lord Dread after his experiment linked his mind with that of the computer OverMind.
- Bruce Gray – The Mentor/Dr. Stuart Gordon Power. The father of the show's main protagonist and the creator of the Soldiers of the Future's Power Suits, Dr. Power was close friends with Dr. Lyman Taggart until their differences surfaced over how the BioMechs should be used. He dies trying to save his son from being assimilated by Taggart. He also created Mentor, an artificial intelligence version of himself, to help Power live life even after his death.

A promotional video produced months before the series aired featured a sixth "Soldiers of the Future" member: Colonel Nathan "Stingray" Johnson, a specialist in seaborne operations. In the recent DVD release, series creator Gary Goddard reveals that the character of "Stingray" Johnson was cut shortly before the series went to production, simply because Landmark Entertainment was unable to afford to build a water tank to film aquatic battles.

=== Voice actors ===
- Deryck Hazel – Soaron: a flying "Warlord-Class" Bio-Dread designed to digitize humans at will.
- Tedd Dillon – OverMind: a supercomputer created by Drs. Power and Taggart to manage all BioMechs around the world, OverMind casts his lot with Taggart after he assumes the personality of Lord Dread.
- John Davies – Blastarr: the only product of Project New Order's Charon program, Blastarr is a BioDread equipped with fingertip lasers and feet that also have tank treads.
- Don Francks – Lackki: a BioDread servant who is actually working for OverMind, but Lord Dread sees his real purpose and engineers an accident to dispose of him for good.

== Comic book ==
The show also spurred a short-lived comic book of the same name, published by Continuity Comics in 1988–1989, illustrated by Neal Adams with stories by J. Michael Straczynski, who was also the series story editor, writing half the episodes and providing stories or outlines for many more.

== DVD release ==
The complete series was released on a 4-disc DVD set in region 1 in December 2011. The set contains all 22 episodes plus much bonus material including interviews and commentaries with cast members.

== Reboot: Phoenix Rising ==
In September 2012, Ain't It Cool News reported that series creator Gary Goddard was in the process of reviving the series. The new series project, titled Phoenix Rising, uses the original rising phoenix symbol of the Captain Power franchise, though the motif has been slightly altered. The series was to be a one-hour weekly drama, looking at both sides of the post-apocalyptic conflict, starting with the origins of characters (which were only touched upon halfway through the first season). No networks or cable channels have been announced as being a part of the project, nor have any casting choices been revealed. On board with the project were the writer/producers Judith and Garfield Reeves-Stevens, who have been tapped to develop the revival/reboot of the franchise. Stephan Martinière was heading up the conceptual art for the show. A 2014 interview revealed that, despite delays, the revival was still in the works.

An announcement teaser for the new series was uploaded to YouTube in July 2016, with the show making an appearance at San Diego Comic-Con.

== Video game ==
There is a video game for Captain Power and the Soldiers of the Future, published by Box Office Software in 1987 for the PC, and 1988 for Commodore 64.

A re-imagined 'singe' based simulation of the VHS XT-7 games has been created using the Hypseus Singe LaserDisc emulator.
