= Darkstalkers (disambiguation) =

Darkstalkers is a fighting game series by Capcom.

Darkstalker(s) may also refer to:

- Darkstalker, an antagonist (and name of one of the novels) in Tui T. Sutherland’s book series Wings of Fire.
- Darkstalkers (TV series), a 1995 American animated series.
- Night Warriors: Darkstalkers’ Revenge (OVA), a 4-episode anime based on the video game.
