= Conquests of Camelot: The Search for the Grail =

1990 video game

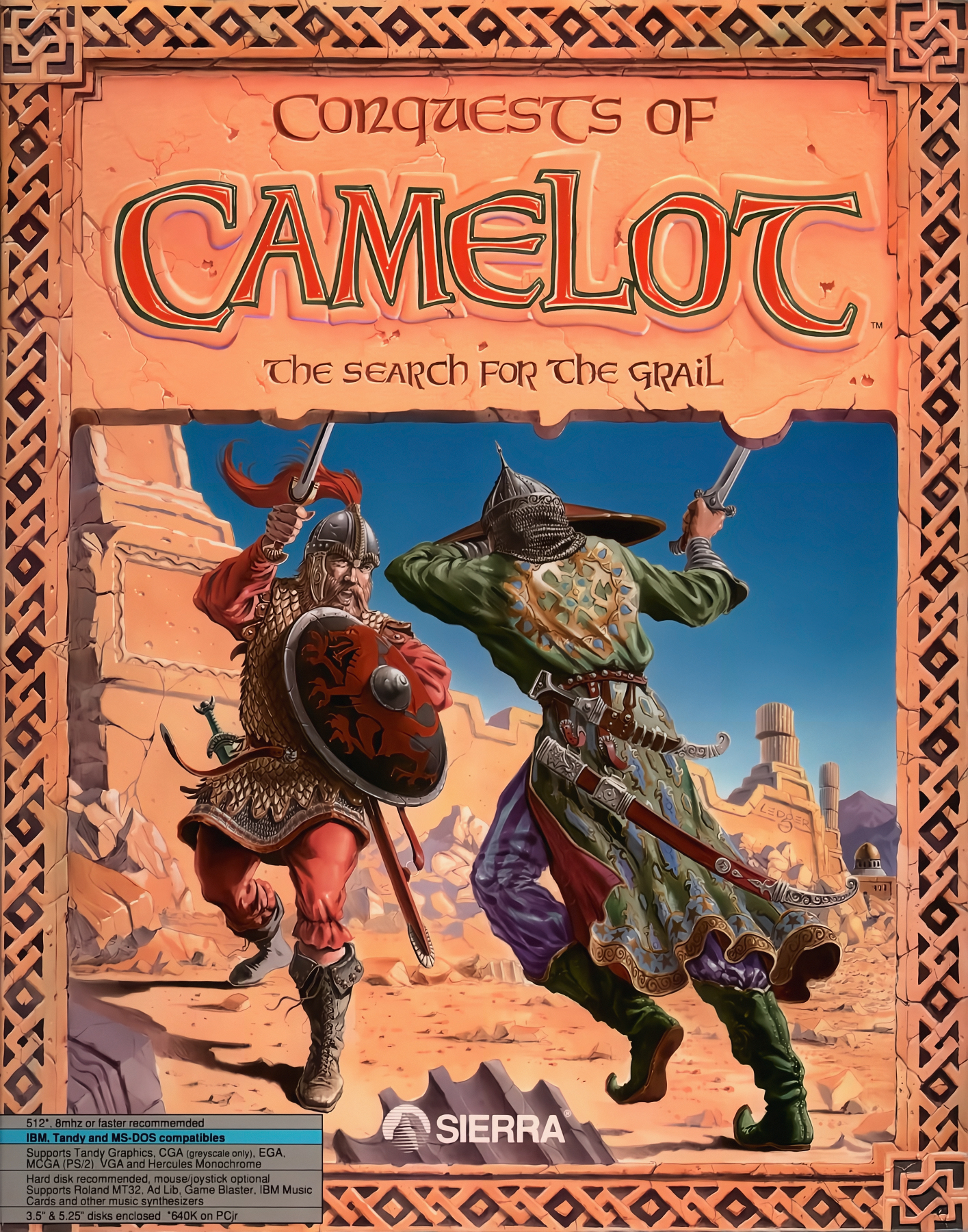
- Cover art by Peter Ledger
- Developer: Sierra On-Line
- Publisher: Sierra On-Line
- Producer: Guruka Singh-Khalsa
- Designer: Christy Marx
- Programmer: David Slayback
- Artist: Peter Ledger
- Composer: Mark Seibert
- Platforms: MS-DOS, Amiga, Atari ST
- Release: March 1990
- Genre: Adventure
- Mode: Single-player

Conquests of Camelot: The Search for the Grail is a graphic adventure game released in 1990 by Sierra On-Line. It was the first game in the Conquests series designed by Christy Marx and her husband Peter Ledger. The only other game in the series was 1991's Conquests of the Longbow: The Legend of Robin Hood. Marx did the majority of the design work while Ledger created the game and package art.

== Gameplay ==
The gameplay is typical of the Sierra adventure games of that time, including several action sequences, puzzles and riddles. Occasionally, some alternative solutions to puzzles are available.

Scoring is based on three kinds of points: Skill (when the player performs deeds that help him in his quest, or defeats enemies), Wisdom (when examining things, talking to others, or gaining hints) and Soul (performing good deeds to help others). The options provide a difficulty setting for the action sequences, but with lower points. The game features a soundtrack of authentic-sounding medieval music composed by Mark Seibert.

The message boxes (narration) are the wizard Merlin speaking and counseling the player. The in-game text displays lesser-known forms of words, for example Gwenhyver, Excaliber, Gawaine, Launcelot, and magick instead of the better-known Guinevere, Excalibur, Gawain, Lancelot, and magic. The parser, however, understands all spellings.

The package includes a map of Europe in Arthurian times and an illustrated manual called Liber Ex Doctrina (Latin for either "Book (derived) from Knowledge" or "Book of Doctrine"). This book includes information about the evolution of the Arthurian and Grail myths as well as Greek and Roman mythology; some of this information is required in order to answer riddles within the game.

== Plot ==
The game begins at the decline of Camelot because of the love triangle between King Arthur, Guinevere and Lancelot. This 'curse' brought famine and drought in the kingdom. After having a vision of the Holy Grail covered by a silver cloth, Gawain, Lancelot and Galahad departed on a quest for the Holy Grail, but they did not return. The player controls Arthur in his search for the missing knights and the Grail.

The adventure begins at Camelot and then the player travels across England. On his way to Glastonbury Tor he is challenged to a joust by a Black Knight before rescuing Gawain. In the ruins of the Tor he meets a mad hermit, a monk who serves the "Old Ones" and claims he has the Grail, left by Joseph of Arimathea. Afterwards, he visits Ot Moor where the frozen (due to the curse) Lady of the Lake challenges Arthur to a riddle in order to rescue the imprisoned Lancelot.

From Southampton, Arthur leaves England in order to follow Galahad's traces. He arrives in Gaza where he is hosted by a man called Al Sirat, who will introduce him to the cult of the Six Goddesses. At Jerusalem Arthur is tried throughout his acts of selflessness and helping people. After traversing a series of perilous catacombs and saving Galahad from his terminal illness, the player reaches the ancient Temple of Aphrodite, where the goddess directs him to the Grail. Arthur recovers the Grail but it is promptly snatched by the thief from Gaza. After Arthur deals with the thief, he and Galahad are transported back to Camelot. The Grail is offered to the Christian altar within the Chapel then disappears, driving away Mithras, ending the famine and restoring prosperity within Camelot. Though the curse from the love triangle is lifted from the land, it remains within Arthur's heart.

== Historical references ==
The game is marked by folkloric knowledge that is woven between the dialogues and the descriptions as the plot unfolds. When the player moves the cursor around the map of England, Merlin will comment on legendary figures such as Brutus of Troy or Ascapart and early legendary saints. In the scenery representing the ruins of Glastonbury Tor, there is a Glastonbury Thorn, which Merlin mentions originated with the Joseph of Arimathea. There is also a well, the lid of which resembles the Chalice Well. Before reaching Jerusalem, Arthur has a stop at the Pool of Siloam.

== Themes ==
A theme seen throughout the game is the intermediate period of Sub-Roman Britain before Christianity, as a new religion, replaces the old ones. In Camelot there is a Chapel dedicated both to Mithras (who is however represented by a labarum) for the soldiers of Roman heritage, and Jesus Christ for the Christian soldiers. Cernunnos and Aphrodite are portrayed as real gods, but their powers and influence are in decline because of the advent of Christianity. In the ending sequence of the game, the Grail obliterates the purported "symbol of Mithras" in the chapel. The Grail's power seems to be universal both as a Christian relic and an artifact (the cauldron) of feminine power of the Goddess in pagan folklore.

Another theme interwoven with the gameplay is that Arthur is supposed to perform good deeds to prove himself worthy of the Grail. In the Jerusalem sequence, the player has to discern the locals' problems and help them in order to advance the game. If the player decides not to help even one of his knights and thus avoid the trials and action sequences, the game can be completed, but the Grail will kill Arthur near the end of the game.

== Reception ==
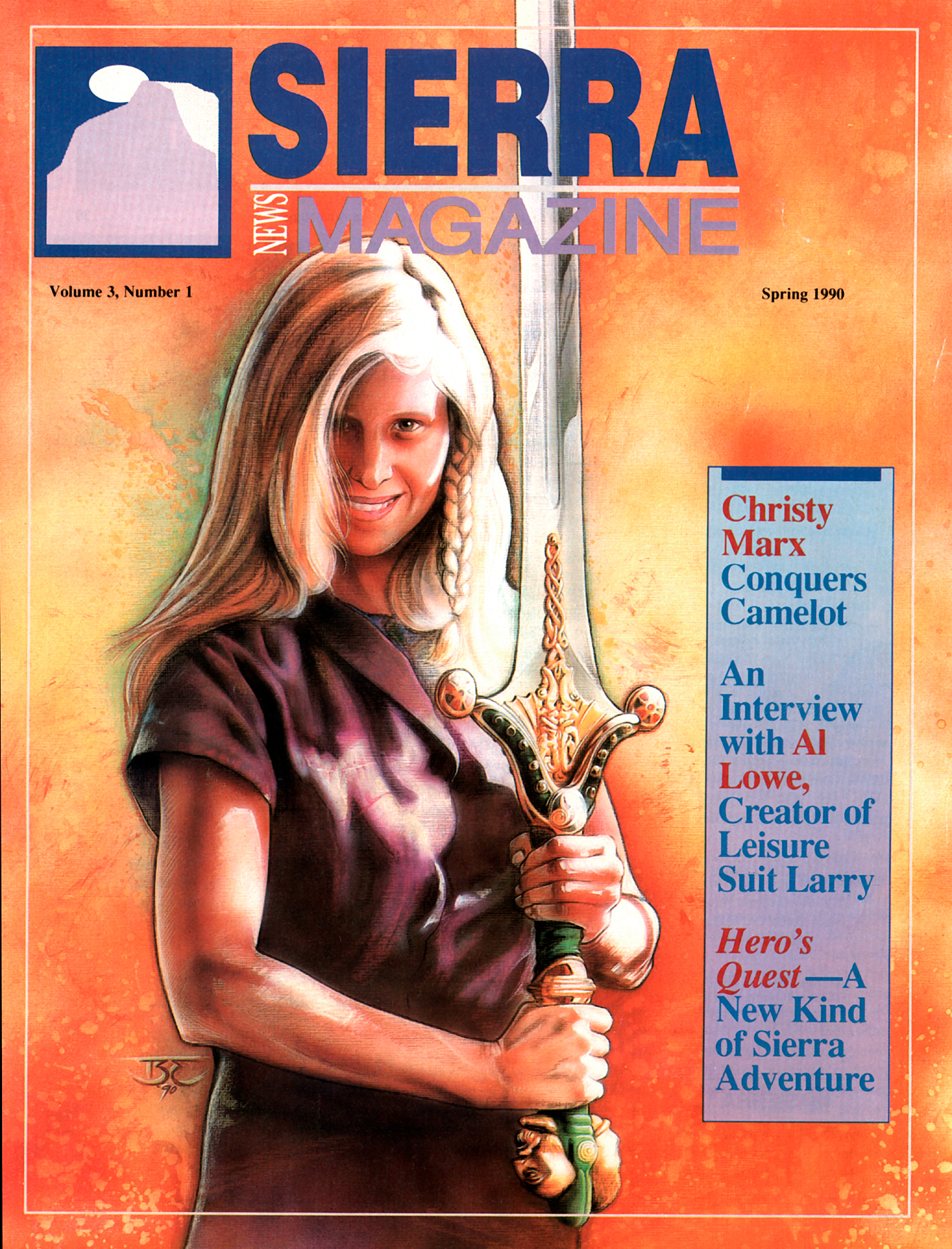
Marx promoting Conquests of Camelot on the cover of the Sierra Magazine.

In the July 1990 edition of Games International (issue 16), Theo Clarke stated that "Conquests of Camelot has a delicacy that is unusual in this field. There is little overt humour but a gentle wit pervades the game", but felt that the EGA graphics needed to be upgraded. Nevertheless Clarke concluded by giving the game excellent ratings of 9 out of 10 for both gameplay and graphics, saying the game was "a refreshing, challenging adventure game which should appeal strongly to those with a taste for medieval romance".

In the July–August 1990 edition of Computer Gaming World, Scorpia stated that Conquests of Camelot's EGA graphics were inferior to those of previous Sierra games, and she did not recommend the game to more experienced adventurers because of the low difficulty level of the puzzles.

In the August 1990 Dragon (Issue 160), Hartley, Patricia and Kirk Lesser called this "a beautifully crafted animated adventure. Sierra, long recognized as a leader in the animated adventure market, continues to lead the way with offerings such as this colorful journey to the time of King Arthur". They concluded by giving the game an excellent rating of 4½ out of 5, saying, "Conquests of Camelot is yet another 'must buy' from the talented folk at Sierra".

== Reviews ==
- Amiga Joker (September 1990)
- Amiga Computing (September 1990)
- Enchanted Realms (November 1990)
- Atari ST User (April 1991)
- Joker Verlag präsentiert: Sonderheft (1993)
