= Douglas Netter =

American television executive

Douglas Netter (May 23, 1921 – May 8, 2017) was an American television executive, largely in the science fiction genre. His first credit was as associate producer of the 1967 Matt Helm (Dean Martin) comedy The Ambushers, about a government-built flying saucer.

== Biography ==
In October 1967, Netter was signed as a producer to actor Jack Lemmon's independent film production company, Jalem Productions. His role was to develop properties for production, either starring or non-starring properties for Lemmon, as the company had deals with Columbia Pictures and Cinema Center Films. In December 1967, it was reported that Netter was developing the property The Crime Against Marcella for Jalem Productions, a film which was not to star Lemmon (like Cool Hand Luke, also produced by Lemmon) with financing and distribution through Cinema Center Films. The film was never made.

Between 1970 and 1975 Netter was the Executive Vice President and Chief Operating Officer at MGM Studios. It was a controversial period at the studio with many filmmakers unhappy with the treatment they received from Netter and studio president James Aubrey.

In 1975 he produced the Dean Martin crime movie Mr. Ricco, and in 1978 was co-producer of the African mercenary movie The Wild Geese. The next year he began a period when he concentrated on the Western genre, producing The Sacketts, a TV miniseries based on Louis L'Amour's Sackett family and serving as executive producer of the NBC TV movie Buffalo Soldiers. Over the next two years he also executive produced Wild Times and L'Amour's The Cherokee Trail.

1987 saw Netter's first involvement with J. Michael Straczynski, when he was producer of Captain Power and the Soldiers of the Future that was story-edited and partially written by Straczynski, after which he was executive producer of the Babylon 5 TV series and various spin-offs (sharing equal executive producer credit with Straczynski). A still photo of Netter shows him portraying the Babylon 5 character of Earth Alliance President Luis Santiago (The A-Z Guide to Babylon 5, ISBN 0-440-22385-7).

Between the third and fourth seasons of Babylon 5, he founded and appointed himself CEO of Netter Digital, a CGI special effects company. Netter Digital then replaced Foundation Imaging as the special effects studio for the series, doing all the CGI work for the final season of that show, as well as several of the Babylon 5 telefilms, and did all the effects for its short-lived spinoff, Crusade. He was also an executive producer for the only season of Hypernauts in 1996.

With the cancellation of Crusade in 1999, Netter Digital lost its only client. Unable to promptly replace it with other customers, the company went out of business in 2000.

In 2006, Netter began executive producing Babylon 5: The Lost Tales, his last venture set in the Babylon 5 universe. The direct-to-DVD publication was released on July 31, 2007. Netter died on May 8, 2017.

His grandson Jason Netter was an associate editor on Babylon 5 and has gone on to produce a number of shows, including Preacher (2016-2019) for AMC and The Boys for Amazon Prime.
