= Christy Marx =

American screenwriter

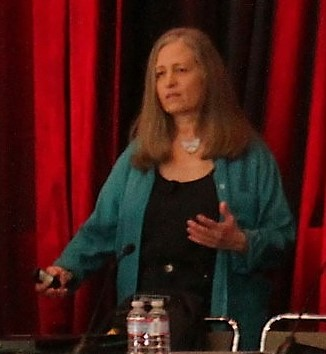
- Marx at the 2015 Game Developers Conference
- Born: 1952 (age 73–74)
- Occupation: Screenwriter
- Spouse(s): Randy Littlejohn; Peter Ledger (1983–1994; his death)
- Writing career
- Years active: 1978–present
- Notable works: Jem, Teenage Mutant Ninja Turtles, Conan the Adventurer, G.I. Joe, Hypernauts, Captain Power

Christy Marx (born 1952) is an American scriptwriter, author, game designer, and narrative designer. She is best known for her work on various television series including Jem, Teenage Mutant Ninja Turtles, Conan the Adventurer, G.I. Joe, Hypernauts, and Captain Power. She is also known for her comic book work, including her original comic book series Sisterhood of Steel as well as work on Conan, Red Sonja, and Elfquest. Marx has also authored several biographies and history books.

== Career ==
Marx's earliest published works in the comics industry included Red Sonja stories.

She would make her debut in the gaming industry with both writing and designing with Conquests of Camelot in 1990, and followed it with Conquests of the Longbow.

She began working at Zynga in late 2010, where she continued to work with games such as Hidden Chronicles. She left the company in 2017.

In June 2012, it was announced that Marx would be writing the character of Amethyst, Princess of Gemworld in a revival of the comic book series Sword of Sorcery, which was released in August 2013.

She has also authored a writing manual, Writing for Animation, Comics, and Games. The book covers how to write for multiple mediums and formats.

== Personal life ==
Marx's first husband, Peter Ledger, was an illustrator. The computer game Conquests of Camelot and the 1987 Sisterhood of Steel graphic novel by Eclipse features his art.

== Awards ==
- In 2000, Marx won the Animation Writers Caucus Animation Award from the Writers Guild of America for her contributions to the field of animation writing.
- Best Computer Adventure game 1990, by Video Games and Computer Entertainment Magazine, for Conquests of Camelot: The Search for the Holy Grail
- Best Adventure game 1991, by Computer Game Review and Enchanted Realms, for Conquests of the Longbow: The Legend of Robin Hood
- Marx was part of the team that won a 2006 Distinguished Achievement Award from the Association of Educational Publishers for the Harcourt Achieve Steck-Vaughn IMPACT Graphic Novels series

== Publications ==
=== Books ===
- Life in the Ocean Depths (Life in Extreme Environments) 2003
- Watson and Crick and DNA (Primary Sources of Revolutionary Scientific Discoveries and Theories) 2005
- The Great Chicago Fire of 1871 (Tragic Fires Throughout History) 2004
- Jet Li (Martial Arts Masters) 2002
- Writing for Animation, Comics, and Games 2007

=== Comics ===
- Sword of Sorcery Volume 1: Amethyst, 2013
- Birds of Prey #27, 2014
- Convergence: Zero Hour Book 1, published in 2015

== Filmography ==
=== Television ===
(series head writer denoted in bold)

- The New Fantastic Four (1978)
- Spider-Man (1981-1982)
- Spider-Man and His Amazing Friends (1981-1982)
- G.I. Joe: A Real American Hero (1985)
- **Jem** (1985-1988)
- Captain Power and the Soldiers of the Future (1988)
- Teenage Mutant Ninja Turtles (1988)
- Dino-Riders (1988)
- The Twilight Zone (1989)
- G.I. Joe: A Real American Hero (1990)
- Bucky O'Hare and the Toad Wars! (1991)
- **Conan the Adventurer** (1992-1993)
- Babylon 5 (1994)
- Mighty Max (1994)
- Darkstalkers (1995)
- **Hypernauts** (1996)
- Captain Simian & the Space Monkeys (1997)
- ReBoot (1997)
- Pocket Dragon Adventures (1998)
- Beast Wars: Transformers (1998)
- Shadow Raiders (1998-1999)
- Roswell Conspiracies: Aliens, Myths and Legends (1999)
- Kong: The Animated Series (2000)
- X-Men: Evolution (2001)
- Ultimate Book of Spells (2001)
- Stargate Infinity (2002)
- He-Man and the Masters of the Universe (2003)
- Alien Racers (2005)
- Zorro: Generation Z (2006)
- Legend of the Dragon (2006)
- Biker Mice from Mars (2006)
- Dork Hunters from Outer Space (2008)

=== Film ===
- What Waits Below (1984)
- 20,000 Leagues Under the Sea (2002)
- Jem and the Holograms (2015)

== Video games ==
- Conquests of Camelot: The Search for the Grail (1990)
- Conquests of the Longbow: The Legend of Robin Hood (1991)
- The Legend of Alon D'ar (2001)
- Tao Feng: Fist of the Lotus (2003)
- CSI: Hard Evidence (2007)
- The Lord of the Rings: War in the North (2011)
