= Peter Ledger =

Australian cartoonist, artist, and illustrator

- Born: 25 October 1945; Sydney, New South Wales, Australia
- Died: 18 November 1994 (aged 49); Oakhurst, California, United States
- Occupations: Cartoonist; illustrator; painter
- Writing career
- Period: 1970s–1994

Peter Ledger (25 October 1945 – 18 November 1994) was an Australian cartoonist, comic book artist, commercial airbrush artist, and illustrator.

== Biography ==
In addition to studying art, Ledger worked with surveying teams in the Australian outback, hunted deer for the government in New Zealand, was a professional scuba diver, a leathermaker, and a gourmet cook. He raced motorcycles, flew hot air balloons, was a body builder, and in later years became a private pilot.

Ledger rose to the top as an illustrator in Australia, famous for his intricate airbrush work and fantasy images. Ledger prepared the graphics for the 1974 Australian film, Stone, as well as the 1976 film, Oz. In 1977, he won the "Art Directors Silver Award" for his Surfabout poster. That same year, one of his posters for Golden Breed (an Australian surfing apparel brand) was honored in the Graphis yearbook of award-winning posters from around the world. In 1979 he won an Australian King of Pop award for "Best Album Cover Design" for The Angels' album Face to Face. From around 1978–1979, he lived in New York and worked for Marvel Comics. One of his contributions to the comic book field was the fully painted and airbrushed work on the series, Weirdworld: Warriors of the Shadow Realm.

In 1981, he moved to Los Angeles to work on a project funded by George Lucas and Gary Kurtz. It was a coffee table art book of Uncle Scrooge McDuck: His Life and Times, as written and drawn by Carl Barks. Ledger was a big fan of Barks' duck art. His contribution was to hand-paint and airbrush all the stories. He met writer Christy Marx for the second time in that year. They were married on Catalina Island in March 1983. They worked together on comic book, movie, and game projects for a total of thirteen years.

As a team, they produced a number of comic book stories such as Carlos McLlyr and The Sisterhood of Steel graphic novel.

Ledger worked in the film and television business, mainly doing storyboards and preproduction design. He painted robot suits and designed aliens for the movie The Ice Pirates. He created the first Babylon 5 logo, did the first character illustrations and an initial painting of the B5 station. J. Michael Straczynski used this art while selling the series.

Ledger loved planes and his particular deep interest, since he was a boy, was the German planes of World War II, most especially the jet aircraft developed during the war. In 1988, Ledger and his wife travelled to Bonn, Germany to have his limited edition aviation print signed by famous German World War II ace, Adolf Galland.

Toward the end of 1988, Ledger and Marx started working on computer games for Sierra On-Line. He created the art for Conquests of Camelot: The Search for the Grail (1990 – Sierra On-Line), Ringworld: Revenge of the Patriarch (1992 – Tsunami Media Inc), Blue Force (1993 – Tsunami Media Inc) and Blood & Magic (1996 – Interplay Productions Inc).

From about 1990 on, Ledger concentrated on doing large wall murals and trompe-l'œil paintings. He partnered with British artist, Susie Wilson. Together, they created many trompe l'oiel works in the Fresno, Oakhurst and Monterey areas. Most are in private homes, but some of their work was seen at Castillo's Mexican Restaurant in Oakhurst, California (later renamed Casa Velasco), on the way to Yosemite National Park: jungle scenes, desert scenes, parrots, a pterodactyl bursting in through an open (trompe-l'œil) window.

=== Death ===
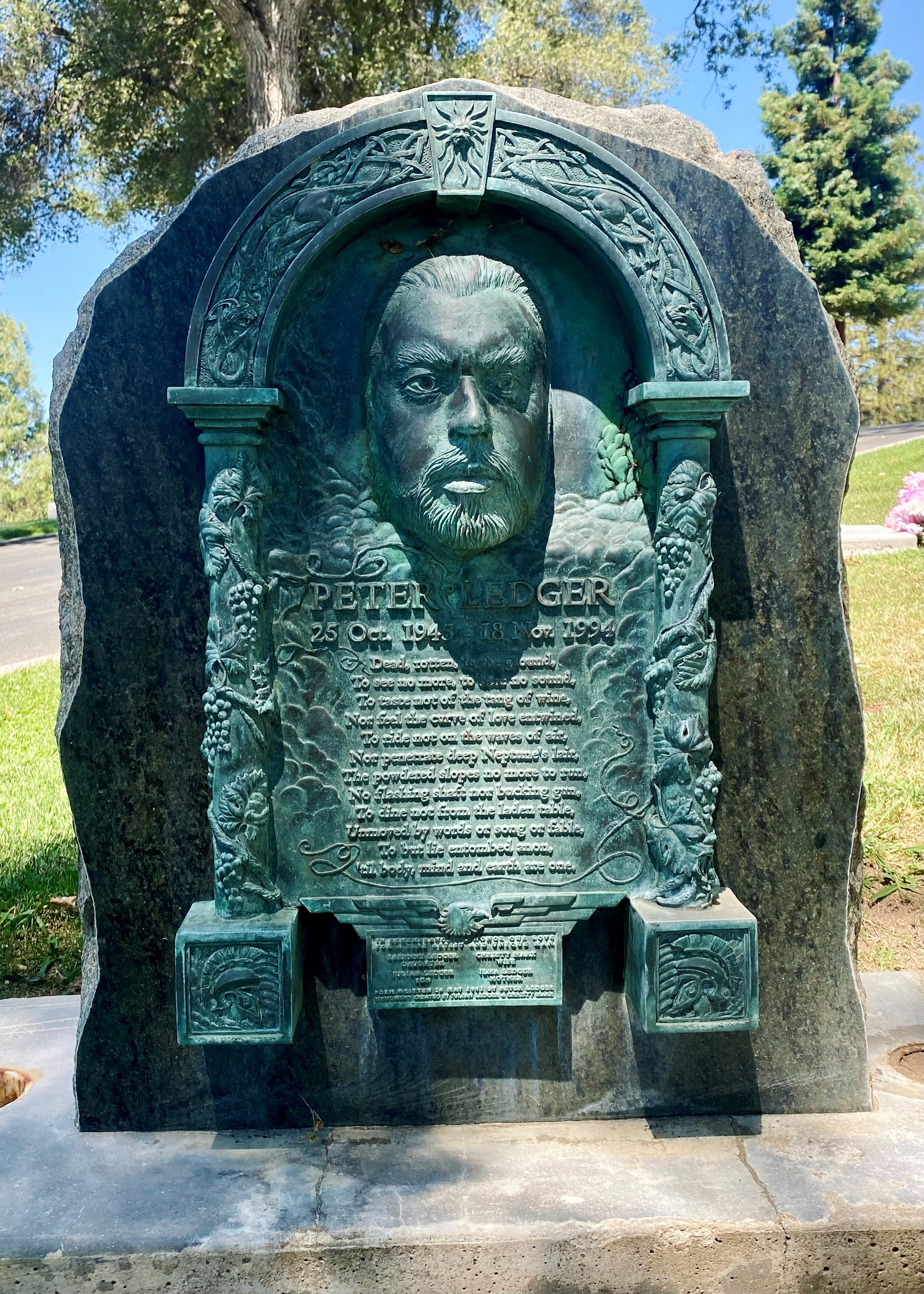
Peter Ledger’s headstone in Oakhill Cemetery in Oakhurst.

Ledger's wife Christy Marx includes an account of his death in a biographical article on her official website. On the evening of 18 November 1994, Ledger was driving home to Oakhurst from Monterey. Ledger was on a dark country road and is believed to have either missed or ignored a stop sign at a blind corner. He was hit broadside by a semi-trailer hauling a full load of cotton, with both vehicles destroyed in the crash. The truck driver survived; however, Ledger died instantly. He was buried in the small, historic cemetery in Oakhurst.

His gravestone features a bronze plaque of his face (taken from a life mask), an epitaph poem that Ledger had written a few years earlier, and numerous sculpted details created by his son, Julian Ledger.

== Legacy ==
The Ledger Awards, named in honour of Ledger's contribution to comic book art, were organised to "acknowledge excellence in Australian comic art and publishing." The Ledger Awards commenced in 2004 and ran until 2007. They were revived beginning in 2014.

== Comics bibliography ==
=== Celestial Arts ===
- Uncle Scrooge, His Life and Times (colourist) (1981)

=== Eclipse Comics ===
- Alien Encounters (1985–1987)
  - #2 "The Monster of Planet Og!" (artist/colourist)
  - #6 (cover artist and colourist)
  - #11 "A World A Hurtin'" (artist/colourist)
  - #13 "The Light at the End" (artist/colourist)
- Eclipse Monthly (1984)
  - #6 "Carlos McLyr, the Californio: Old Gods, New World" (artist/colourist)
  - #7 "Carlos McLyr, the Californio: Old Gods, New World Part 2" (artist/colourist)
  - #8 "Carlos McLyr, the Californio: Old Gods, New World Part 3" (artist/colourist)
- Tales of Terror #13 (cover artist/colourist) (1987)

=== Fantagraphics Books ===
- The Flames of Gyro (inker/colourist) (1979)

=== Marvel Comics ===
- Howard the Duck vol. 2 #1–2 (cover artist/colourist) (1979)
- The Hulk! #15 (one page illustration) (1979)
- Marvel Super Special (1979)
  - #10 "Star-Lord" (cover colourist)
  - #11–13 "Warriors of the Shadow Realm" (colourist)
  - #14 "Meteor" (cover inker/colourist)
- Open Space #2 (1990)
  - "The Armada Operation" (artist)
- Savage Sword of Conan #55 (one page illustration) (1980)
- Sisterhood of Steel #5 (cover colourist) (1985)

=== Mattel ===
- Masters of the Universe: Skeletor's Dragon (artist) (1985)

=== TSR, Inc. ===
- Warhawks Comics Module #1 (penciller/colourist) (1990)
