= Netter Digital =

Netter Digital Entertainment
- Company type: Corporation (NETTQ)
- Industry: Visual effects, CGI animation
- Founded: North Hollywood, California (1995)
- Headquarters: North Hollywood, California, United States
- Revenue: $23.3 million (1999)

Netter Digital Entertainment (NDE) was a visual effects and CGI special effects company founded in 1995 and went out of business in 2000.

== History ==
Netter Digital Entertainment was created by Douglas Netter in 1995. The company produced the show Hypernauts before moving to digital EFX work and replacing Foundation Imaging in the final two seasons of Babylon 5 as the sole producer of CGI special effects for that series as well as several of the B5 Made-For-TV movies. NDE also produced all the effects for its short-lived spinoff, Crusade.

With the cancellation of Crusade in 1999, Netter Digital lost its only client. They subsequently worked on the Dan Dare, Max Steel, and Robotech 3000 animated television series, but this was not enough to prevent them going out of business in 2000. They were replaced on Dan Dare and Max Steel by Foundation Imaging.

== Filmography ==
- Babylon 5
- Crusade
- Dane Dare
- Max Steel
- Robotech 3000
