= Mike Vosburg =

American comic book artist

- Born: Michael Vosburg; July 23, 1947 (age 79)
- Areas: Penciler, inker
- Pseudonym: Voz
- Notable works: Tales from the Crypt

Michael Vosburg (/ˈvɒzbɜːrɡ/; born July 23, 1947), also known as Voz, is an American comic book artist primarily known for his work on the Tales from the Crypt TV series.

== Career ==
Mike Vosburg's comics career began in the 1960s, when as a 15-year-old teenager he started Masquerader in 1962, one of the first comic book fanzines, which lasted eight issues (0-7) until 1964. He began working in underground comics in the 1970s, with creations such as Split Screen, written by Tom Veitch. Later in the 1970s and 1980s, Vosburg contributed to horror titles by Western Publishing and Charlton Comics. His story "Mail Order Brides", published in Kitchen Sink Press's Bizarre Sex #3, was in a similar horror/mystery vein.

Around this time, Vosburg also did various work for DC Comics and Marvel Comics. His works from that period include Savage She-Hulk, Sisterhood of Steel, and G.I. Joe: A Real American Hero. He also worked on the Valiant Comics' titles Bloodshot and Archer & Armstrong.

From 1989 to 1996, for the TV series Tales from the Crypt, Vosburg illustrated comic book covers designed to look like the original 1950s eponymous comics. Originally hired to do concept drawings for the wraparound sequence, Vosburg ended up storyboarding the title segment as well as illustrating almost every cover used in the show's 93 episodes (although at least one was by Shawn McManus, "The Man Who Was Death").

While Vosburg still does occasional comics work like covers and pinups, or his self-published Lori Lovecraft books, most of his time is currently devoted to television and film. He has done storyboarding work for such directors as John Frankenheimer, Robert Zemeckis, Allan Arkush, and Gilbert Adler; on projects as diverse as David Mamet's The Water Engine, the Elian Gonzalez Story, Prince Charming, and Demon Knight. He has also done storyboarding for music videos, such as "Stan" and "Let Me Blow Ya Mind".

== Personal life ==
Vosburg attended Oakland University. He married Anna Moon in 1984, and shortly thereafter moved back to California.
