= Sisterhood of Steel =

The Sisterhood of Steel

Publication information
- Publisher: Epic Comics
- Schedule: Irregular
- Format: Limited series
- Publication date: December 1984 – February 1986
- No. of issues: 8

Creative team
- Created by: Christy Marx
- Written by: Christy Marx
- Artist: Mike Vosburg

The Sisterhood of Steel is a series of comics by Christy Marx.

In the series, a society of warrior-women has survived for generations by hiring out its elite forces. Each Sister has been trained in the art of battle since childhood. The series focuses on the life of Boronwë, a young woman coming of age in a world where survival rests on the edge of a blade.

== Publication history ==
The comic was first published as an eight-issue limited series by Epic Comics, a division of Marvel Comics that specialized in creator-owned books for an adult audience. Mike Vosburg did the artwork.

During the run of the series, Marx started a self-published bi-monthly newsletter called Scrolls of the Sisterhood which ran behind-the-scenes information on The Sisterhood of Steel.

Marx and Epic were in negotiations to continue with a series of graphic novels, until this was derailed in a disagreement over content restrictions on the books.

Subsequently, Marx took the series to Eclipse Comics, which in partnership with Moonfire Productions (Marx's self-publishing imprint), published the graphic novel, Boronwë: Daughter of Death, in both paperback and hardcover. Peter Ledger illustrated it.
