= Dungeons & Dragons (TV series) =

1983 animated television series

- DVD cover
- Genre: Action; Adventure; Fantasy
- Created by: Kevin Paul Coates; Dennis Marks; Takashi
- Based on: Dungeons & Dragons by TSR
- Developed by: Mark Evanier
- Written by: Karl Geurs
- Directed by: John Gibbs
- Voices of: Willie Aames; Don Most; Adam Rich; Peter Cullen; Teddy Field III; Katie Leigh; Sidney Miller; Tonia Gayle Smith; Frank Welker
- Composers: Johnny Douglas; Rob Walsh (additional music)
- Country of origin: United States
- Original language: English
- No. of seasons: 3
- No. of episodes: 27

Production
- Executive producers: David H. DePatie (season 1); Lee Gunther (seasons 1–3); Margaret Loesch (seasons 2–3)
- Producers: Bob Richardson (season 1); Karl Geurs (seasons 2–3)
- Running time: 24 minutes
- Production companies: Marvel Productions; D&D Entertainment

Original release
- Network: CBS
- Release: September 17, 1983 – December 7, 1985

Dungeons & Dragons is an American fantasy animated television series based on TSR's Dungeons & Dragons role-playing game. It is a co-production of Marvel Productions and TSR, with animation services provided by Japanese studio Toei Animation. It ran on CBS from 1983 through 1985 for three seasons, for a total of twenty-seven episodes.

The show focuses on a group of six friends who are transported into the realm of Dungeons & Dragons, following their adventures as they try to find a way home with the help of their guide the Dungeon Master while combating an evil wizard.

== Overview ==
The show focuses on a group of friends aged between 8 and 15 who are transported to the realm of Dungeons & Dragons by taking a magical dark ride on an amusement park roller coaster. Upon arriving in the realm they meet Dungeon Master (named for the referee in the tabletop role-playing game), who gives each child a magical item granting each of them powers appropriate to a D&D character class.

The children's main goal is to find a way home, but they often take detours to help people or find that their fates are intertwined with that of others. The group comes across many different enemies, but their primary antagonist is Venger. He is a powerful wizard who wishes to rule the realm and believes the power from the children's weapons will help him to do so. Another recurring villain is Tiamat, who is a five-headed dragon and the only creature that Venger fears.

Throughout the series, a connection is suggested between Dungeon Master and Venger. At the end of the episode "The Dragon's Graveyard", Dungeon Master calls Venger "my son". At the end of "The Treasure of Tardos", he states "We all make mistakes. Venger... was mine." The final unproduced episode "Requiem" would have confirmed that Venger is the Dungeon Master's corrupted son (making Kareena the sister of Venger and the daughter of Dungeon Master), redeemed Venger (giving those trapped in the realm their freedom), and ended on a cliffhanger where the six children could finally return home or deal with evil that still existed in the realm.

This unproduced episode would have served as both a conclusion to the story and as a re-imagining of the show, had it been picked up for a fourth season, but was canceled before the episode was made. The script has since been published online and was performed as an audio drama as a special feature for the BCI Eclipse DVD edition of the series.

== Characters ==
=== Heroes ===
Hank, Eric, Diana, Presto, Sheila, Bobby, and Uni in the first episode "The Night of No Tomorrow".

- Hank, the Ranger (voiced by Willie Aames) – at 15 years of age, he is the leader of the group. Hank is brave and noble, maintaining a focus and determination even when presented with grave danger. Hank is a Ranger, with a magical bow that shoots arrows of glowing energy. These arrows can be used in many different ways such as a climbing tool, to hurt enemies, to bind them, to create light, or to form temporary makeshift cages.
- Eric, the Cavalier (voiced by Don Most) – a Cavalier who is 15, he is a spoiled child, originating from a rich home. On the surface, Eric is a big-mouthed comic relief coward. Eric has a heroic core, and frequently saves his friends from danger with his magical shield decorated with a griffin, which can project a force field. Despite his aloofness and several instances of selfishness, Eric shares the common camaraderie of the group, and occasionally steps to the fore as a substitute leader in Hank's absence.
- Diana, the Acrobat (voiced by Tonia Gayle Smith) – a brave, athletic, and outspoken 14-year-old girl, she is an Acrobat who carries a magical quarterstaff which can change size to suit her needs and be easily reconstructed if broken. Diana is also known to provide inspiration, guidance, and support for her friends at times of peril or worry.
- Presto, the Magician (voiced by Adam Rich) – a 14-year-old Wizard of the team, equipped with a magic hat. Friendly and fiercely loyal to all in the group, Presto fulfills the role of the well-meaning, diligent magic user whose spells frequently—though not always—either fail or produce unintended results.
- Sheila, the Thief (voiced by Katie Leigh) – as a Thief, Sheila, aged 13, has a cloak which makes her invisible when the hood is raised over her head. Although occasionally emotionally vulnerable, somewhat worrisome and with a great fear of being alone in the realm, Sheila regularly utilizes the stealth attributes of her cloak at great peril to herself for the benefit of the common goals of her group.
- Bobby, the Barbarian (voiced by Ted Field III) – the youngest member of the team at nine years old and the younger brother of Sheila. He is a Barbarian, as indicated by his fur pants and boots, horned helmet, and cross belt harness. Brash, brave and selfless but occasionally impulsive, Bobby's personality frequently puts himself and his friends in danger. His magic cudgel, which can shake the ground when struck against it, saves the protagonists from peril on numerous occasions.
- Uni (vocal effects provided by Frank Welker) – Uni is Bobby's pet, a baby unicorn. Markedly timid, she is remarkably intelligent, shown to be capable of using Presto's hat's magic on at least one occasion, and can teleport once per day.
- Dungeon Master (voiced by Sidney Miller) – the group's mentor, he provides important advice and help, but often in a cryptic manner that does not make sense until the team has completed the quest of each episode. Dungeon Master supplies the companions with their weapons and clues for their numerous opportunities to return home.

=== Villains ===
Venger as seen in "The Dragon's Graveyard".

- Venger, the Force of Evil (voiced by Peter Cullen) – the main antagonist and the Dungeon Master's son, Venger is an evil wizard of great power sporting one horn, white skin, fangs, and bat-like wings. He seeks to use the children's magical weapons to bolster his power.
  - Shadow Demon (voiced by Bob Holt) – a shadowy demon who is Venger's personal spy and assistant. Shadow Demon often informs Venger about the children's current quests and refers to them as "Dungeon Master's young ones".
  - Night-Mare – a black horse that serves as Venger's mode of transportation.
- Tiamat (voiced by Frank Welker) – a fearsome five-headed dragon with a reverberating multi-level voice. Her five heads are a white head that breathes ice, a green head that breathes poison gas, a central red head that breathes fire, a blue head that breathes lightning, and a black head that breathes acid. Tiamat is known to be the sole creature that Venger fears.
- Kareena (voiced by Diane Pershing) – Venger's sister and rival. Kareena first appears in the episode "Citadel of Shadow" when she encounters Sheila as she herself is confined within a force field imposed by Venger. Sheila's altruism within this episode unleashes humanity within Kareena. The unmade final episode to the series "Requiem" was planned to confirm that Kareena was also Dungeon Master's daughter.

== Episodes ==
=== Season 1 (1983) ===
| No. | Title | Directed by | Written by | Original release date |
|---|---|---|---|---|
| 1 | "The Night of No Tomorrow" | John Gibbs & Bob Richardson | Mark Evanier | September 17, 1983 |
Tricked by Venger, Presto conjures up a horde of fire-breathing dragons to threaten the town of Helix. The kids must rescue Presto and save Helix before it is too late.
| 2 | "The Eye of the Beholder" | John Gibbs & Bob Richardson | Hank Saroyan, Mark Evanier, Kimmer Ringwald | September 24, 1983 |
Led by a cowardly knight named Sir John, the children must seek and destroy an evil monster known as the Beholder to find a gateway back to their own world.
| 3 | "The Hall of Bones" | John Gibbs & Bob Richardson | Paul Dini | October 1, 1983 |
Dungeon Master sends the kids on a journey to the Ancient Hall of Bones, where they must recharge their magical weapons. As usual, trouble awaits them around every corner.
| 4 | "Valley of the Unicorns" | John Gibbs & Bob Richardson | Paul Dini & Karl Geurs | October 8, 1983 |
Bobby and the others must rescue Uni when she is captured by a fiendish sorcerer named Kelek, who plans to remove the horns of all unicorns and steal their magical power. Of course he will have to give the unicorn horns to his master Venger when he arrives.
| 5 | "In Search of the Dungeon Master" | John Gibbs & Bob Richardson | Jeffrey Scott | October 15, 1983 |
Dungeon Master is captured by Warduke and frozen in a magic crystal. When the kids discover this terrible truth, they try to rescue him before Venger gets there first.
| 6 | "Beauty and the Bogbeast" | John Gibbs & Bob Richardson | Jeffrey Scott | October 22, 1983 |
Eric is turned into a comical but ugly Bogbeast when he sniffs a forbidden flower. Now he must help the others of this cowardly race defeat an evil ogre who is damming The River that Rains Upside Down.
| 7 | "Prison Without Walls" | John Gibbs & Bob Richardson | Steve Gerber | October 29, 1983 |
The search for the gateway home leads the kids into the Swamp of Sorrow, where they meet a fearsome monster and the dwarf wizard, Lukyon, who guides them on a journey to the Heart Of The Dragon.
| 8 | "Servant of Evil" | John Gibbs & Bob Richardson | Jeffrey Scott | November 5, 1983 |
Bobby's birthday is ruined when Sheila and the others are captured and thrown into Venger's Prison of Agony. With Dungeon Master's guidance, Bobby and Uni must locate the prison, befriend a giant, and rescue their friends.
| 9 | "Quest of the Skeleton Warrior" | John Gibbs & Bob Richardson | Buzz Dixon | November 12, 1983 |
Dekkion, a spellbound ancient warrior, sends the kids to the Lost Tower, where they must face their greatest fears as they seek the Circle Of Power.
| 10 | "The Garden of Zinn" | John Gibbs & Bob Richardson | Jeffrey Scott | November 19, 1983 |
When Bobby is bitten by a poisonous Dragon Turtle, he and Sheila must remain in the care of a strange creature named Solarz while the others seek out an antidote – the foot of a yellow dragon – in the mysterious Garden of Zinn. To save Bobby, Eric must become a king in the realm he hates so much.
| 11 | "The Box" | John Gibbs & Bob Richardson | Jeffrey Scott | November 26, 1983 |
The kids accidentally find Zandora's Box, which can open doorways to many other places. This may be their best chance of getting home, but only Zandora herself knows how to use the box, and she is trapped somewhere inside it.
| 12 | "The Lost Children" | John Gibbs & Bob Richardson | Jeffrey Scott | December 3, 1983 |
With the help of another group of lost children, the kids must brave the dangers of Venger's castle to locate a spaceship which, according to Dungeon Master, just might take them home.
| 13 | "P-R-E-S-T-O Spells Disaster" | John Gibbs & Bob Richardson | Jeffrey Scott | December 10, 1983 |
Another one of Presto's spells misfires, this time leaving Presto and Uni to search for the others who are trapped in a giant's castle and pursued by a strange creature called a Slime Beast.

=== Season 2 (1984) ===
| No. | Title | Directed by | Written by | Original release date |
|---|---|---|---|---|
| 14 | "The Girl Who Dreamed Tomorrow" | John Gibbs | Karl Geurs | September 8, 1984 |
The kids meet Terri, a lost child like themselves who is also a clairvoyant who can dream the future and leads them toward their doorway home – where trouble awaits. Bobby must make a heartbreaking choice to save his soulmate Terri from Venger.
| 15 | "The Treasure of Tardos" | John Gibbs | Michael Reaves | September 15, 1984 |
Dungeon Master warns the kids that they are in danger from the monstrous Demodragon, a half-demon, half-dragon monster capable of destroying the entire realm. Now they must find a bit of dragonsbane in order to render the monster helpless while contending with Venger, Shadow Demon, and an army of orcs.
| 16 | "City at the Edge of Midnight" | John Gibbs | Michael Reaves & Karl Geurs | September 22, 1984 |
The kids must seek out The City At The Edge of Midnight and save its children from The Nightwalker, who steals little children at the stroke of midnight.
| 17 | "The Traitor" | John Gibbs | Jeffrey Scott | September 29, 1984 |
Dungeon Master warns the kids that they are about to face the most difficult trial of their lives. The others are shocked when Hank turns out to be a traitor, not only to them, but to his own courage and insight. Fortunately, it is this that leads him to redemption.
| 18 | "Day of the Dungeon Master" | John Gibbs | Michael Reaves | October 6, 1984 |
When Dungeon Master decides to take a rest and gives Eric his Garb of Power, Venger goes after the Garb, and Eric's powers are truly put to the test.
| 19 | "The Last Illusion" | John Gibbs | Jeffrey Scott | October 13, 1984 |
When Presto finds himself lost in a forest, he sees the apparition of a beautiful young girl named Varla. Dungeon Master tells Presto that by finding the girl, he may find his way home. Though Venger has plans to use Varla in his latest plot to claim the kids' weapons by framing Presto for causing harm to a local village.
| 20 | "The Dragon's Graveyard" | John Gibbs | Michael Reaves | October 20, 1984 |
At the end of their patience with Venger ruining their attempts to return home with the latest attempt involving Venger attacking them with a frost giant, the kids resolve to bring the fight to him. The kids seek the help of Tiamat, the most dangerous dragon in the realm, who assists them in a confrontation with Venger and helps them get one step closer to home.
| 21 | "Child of the Stargazer" | John Gibbs | Michael Reaves | October 27, 1984 |
Kosar, the son of an astrologer from another country, escapes from the evil Demon-Queen Syrith and involves the kids in a battle against good and evil. Diana must make a personal choice regarding going home – her soulmate Kosar, or saving a community.

=== Season 3 (1985) ===
| No. | Title | Directed by | Written by | Original release date |
|---|---|---|---|---|
| 22 | "The Dungeon at the Heart of Dawn" | John Gibbs | Michael Reaves | September 14, 1985 |
While in the Tower of Darkness, the kids open The Box of Balefire and let loose the ultimate evil called the Nameless One who is Venger's master. The Nameless One strips Dungeon Master and Venger of their powers. The kids must now venture to The Heart Of Dawn to restore Dungeon Master's powers while holding a truce with Venger and Shadow Demon when things get worse.
| 23 | "The Time Lost" | John Gibbs | Michael Reaves | September 21, 1985 |
Venger has been abducting military personnel from different battles in Earth, and his latest captive is a US Air Force pilot, whose fighter jet Venger commandeers. Venger then goes to the Second World War and captures a Luftwaffe pilot named Josef, intending to give him the modern fighter jet to make World War II an Axis victory, which would change Earth's history and prevent the kids from ever being born. Josef has a severe struggle within himself about Venger's temptation to make him a war hero, although getting to know the kids revealed his true nature when he privately disposed of his swastika armband, happy to learn from the kids that his native Germany ended being "freed from that tyrant".
| 24 | "Odyssey of the Twelfth Talisman" | John Gibbs | Mark Shiney & Michael L. DePatie | September 28, 1985 |
The Dungeon Master assigns the kids to find the missing Stone Of Astra, the Twelfth Talisman, which makes the wearer invincible. An evil wizard named Korac, who also wants the talisman, wreaks havoc until Venger, who also wants the talisman, instigates a battle.
| 25 | "Citadel of Shadow" | John Gibbs | Katherine Lawrence | October 12, 1985 |
While fleeing an army of orcs, the kids hide in The Hills Of Never; Sheila helps a young woman named Kareena trapped by a spell – whom the children discover is Venger's sister and rival in evil. With two magic rings Sheila must make a personal choice-of either going home-or saving Kareena from being destroyed by Venger.
| 26 | "Cave of the Fairie Dragons" | John Gibbs | Katherine Lawrence | November 9, 1985 |
When they are attacked by giant ants, the kids are saved by Amber, a Fairie Dragon. Amber then asks them to help rescue the Queen of the Fairie Dragons, who was kidnapped by the evil King Varin. The kids must help the Fairie Dragons and find a portal that will take them home at last.
| 27 | "The Winds of Darkness" | John Gibbs | Michael Cassutt & Kathy Selbert, Karl Geurs (Story) | December 7, 1985 |
The Darkling has created a purple fog that consumes all trapped in it, and the kids try to enlist the aid of Martha, an embittered former pupil of Dungeon Master, to save Hank from the fog and destroy The Darkling.

=== Unfinished finale ===
The intended final episode from the third season, and potential series finale, entitled "Requiem," was written by the series' frequent screenwriter Michael Reaves, but was not finished due to the show's cancellation. It would have served as both a conclusion to the current story as well as a re-imagining of the series, had the show continued into a fourth season. Reaves has discussed the episode online, and published the original script on his personal website. The BCI Eclipse Region 1 DVD release includes the script recorded in the form of an audio drama as a special feature.

A fan-made animated version of the finale appeared online in 2020. It includes the original audio drama, with animations mostly recut from the series. It stars Wally Wingert as Dungeon Master and Hank, Daniel Roebuck as Eric, Jarrod Nead as Presto, Neil Kaplan as Venger, and Ryan Nead as Redeemed Venger, with Katie Leigh and Frank Welker reprising their roles as Sheila and Uni, while Leigh also voices Bobby.

== Cast ==
- Willie Aames – Hank the Ranger
- Don Most – Eric the Cavalier
- Tonia Gayle Smith – Diana the Acrobat
- Adam Rich – Presto the Magician
- Peter Cullen – Venger, The Darkling (in the episode "The Winds of Destruction"), additional voices
- Teddy Field III – Bobby the Barbarian
- Katie Leigh – Sheila the Thief
- Sidney Miller – Dungeon Master
- Frank Welker – Uni, Tiamat, Sir John (in the episode "The Eye of the Beholder"), Starfire (in the episode "The Time Lost"), Fairy, Jimmy's Dad, Pilot (in the episode "The Time Lost"), Rugar (in the episode "Dungeon at the Heart of Dawn"), Fairie Dragon (in the episode "Cave of the Faerie Dragons"), additional voices

=== Additional voices ===
- Laurie O'Brien
- Jennifer Darling
- Gary Goren
- Bob Holt – the Shadow Demon
- Georgi Irene
- Maia Mattisse
- Diane Pershing – Kareena (in the episode "Citadel of Shadow")
- Hank Saroyan
- Russi Taylor – Amber the Fairie Dragon (in the episode "Cave of the Faerie Dragons")

== Reception ==
The series received critical acclaim but the level of violence was controversial for American children's television at the time, and the script of one episode, "The Dragon's Graveyard," was almost canceled because the characters contemplated killing their nemesis, Venger. In 1985, the National Coalition on Television Violence demanded that the FTC run a warning during each broadcast stating that Dungeons & Dragons had been linked to real-life violent deaths. The series spawned more than 100 different licenses, and the show led its time slot for two years.

=== Awards ===
For her work on the series, Tonia Gayle Smith (as "Diana") was nominated for Outstanding Young Actress in an Animation Voice-over at the 1984–1985 Youth in Film Awards. In January 2009, IGN ranked Dungeons & Dragons at #64 on its "Best 100 Animated Series" list.

== Home media ==
In 2004, Contender Entertainment Group released the series on four stand-alone DVDs (under license from Fox Kids Europe/Jetix Europe). Extra features on each volume include fan commentary tracks on two episodes, character profiles, and DVD-ROM content. The original series bible, scripts, character model sheets, original promo artwork, an interview with Michael Reaves (writer on the unproduced finale episode "Requiem"), and a featurette on the title sequence are spread amongst the discs. The fourth volume includes the script for "Requiem" and a featurette about it. The four DVDs each have different original cover artwork (by Eamon O'Donoghue) that form a panorama when placed side by side, depicting the main characters of the series: Hank and Sheila with Venger, Presto with Tiamat, Eric and Diana with Shadow Demon, and Bobby with Uni and Dungeon Master.

The first Region 1 DVD release, Dungeons & Dragons – The Complete Animated Series, was released on December 5, 2006, by BCI Eclipse LLC, under its Ink & Paint classic animation entertainment brand (under license from Disney). The 5-disc set featured all 27 episodes, uncut, digitally re-mastered, and presented in story continuity order, as well as an extensive array of special features including documentaries, commentaries, character profiles, a radio play of the unproduced finale episode "Requiem", and more. This release is now out of print, as BCI Eclipse ceased operations in December 2008.

In 2009, Mill Creek Entertainment released the complete series on August 25 (once again under license from Disney), in a 3-disc set without any special features, but with almost all the original music restored; the release contains all the televised episodes but does not contain the radio play of "Requiem".

The complete series was streamed on Twitch on July 9, 2021, as part of the Saturday Morning D&D Secret Lair, which is a limited edition of Magic the Gathering cards showcasing characters from the cartoon, later released on October 29 the same year.

== Merchandise and other media ==
The show produced a variety of spin-off merchandise.

=== Board games ===
In 1984 TSR, Inc. released the board game named Quest for the Dungeonmaster, inspired by the episode "In Search of the Dungeon Master", in which Dungeon Master is captured by Warduke and frozen in a magic crystal, and the kids try to rescue him before Venger gets there. Brazilian company Grow released a Portuguese-language version of this game in 1993.

=== Books ===
Several books based on this series were released at the time of its highest popularity:

- Pick a Path to Adventure books: TSR published six gamebooks written from the point of view of each of the children, each focused on a different character (though Eric's book gave the role of protagonist to his younger brother Michael, who did not appear in the cartoon series).
- UK Annuals: Two hardcover books published in the United Kingdom in 1985 and 1987 by World International Publishing Limited, each including various prose stories. The first featured seven original adventures, while the second only included three, plus Comics Forum's adaptation of "The Eye of the Beholder" (translated as "The Eye of the Watchman!").
- Donjons et Dragons: Published in France, a six-book collection adapting different episodes in storybook form.
- A Little Golden Book titled The Adventure Begins! (2023) written by Dennis R. Shealy with illustrations by Nate Lovett, adapts the episode The Night of No Tomorrow written by Mark Evanier.

=== Card games ===
In 2021, Wizards of the Coast released a "Secret Lair set" for Magic the Gathering based on the animated series.

=== Comic books ===
- Dragones y Mazmorras are comic book adaptations of all 27 episodes by Comics Forum, a division of Spanish publisher Editorial Planeta De Agostini under license from TSR.
- Marvel Summer Special 1987: Published in the United Kingdom, it is an English-language reprint of Comics Forum's adaptation of the episode "Prison Without Walls".
- Forgotten Realms: The Grand Tour: one-shot comic book published by TSR in 1996. It features the now-adult protagonists still living in a Dungeons & Dragons world, this time the Forgotten Realms, with Presto seeking an apprenticeship with Elminster the Sage.
- A miniseries based on the show, Saturday Morning Adventures, written by David M. Booher and Sam Maggs, with artwork by George Kambadais, was released in March 2023 by IDW Publishing.

=== Music ===
A full orchestral version of the Dungeons & Dragons animated series main theme, composed by Johnny Douglas, was released as the sixth track of the 1991 album The Johnny Douglas Strings – On Screen, published by the label Dulcima, a record label founded by Douglas in 1983.

=== Roleplaying games ===
Dungeons & Dragons 3.5 – Animated Series Handbook was produced by Wizards of the Coast and included with the DVD box set of the series released by Ink & Paint in 2006. It contains profiles of each protagonist and an adventure to be played, set chronologically before the episode "The Dragon's Graveyard". In 2024 and 2025, characters from the series appear in the D&D Beyond adventures Uni and the Hunt for the Lost Horn,Scions of Elemental Evil and Hold Back The Dead.

=== Television advertisements ===
The characters were licensed for a Brazilian live-action television advertisement, released in May 2019 to promote the launch of Renault's Kwid Outsider, which saw the characters using it to return home to the real world. It was shot in Salta, in Argentina, near the Andes mountain range.

=== Toys and collectibles ===
An Advanced Dungeons & Dragons toy line was produced by LJN in 1983, including original characters such as Warduke, Strongheart the Paladin, and the evil Wizard Kelek, who would later appear in campaigns for the Basic Set of the roleplaying game. None of the main characters from the TV series are in the toy line, but Warduke, Strongheart, and Kelek each appear in one episode of the series. Only in Spain and Portugal were PVC figures of the main characters produced. The Brazilian company Iron Studios released in 2019 an entire set of polystone collectible statues for most of the Dungeons & Dragons cartoon characters, using a 1/10 scale and forming a full diorama. The same year, PCS Collectibles released two versions of Venger in 1:4 scale, both fully sculpted and hand painted polystone statues. In 2022, Hasbro launched the Cartoon Classics action figurine series based on Dungeons & Dragons.

In 2024, the characters in the series won miniatures given by the Brazilian fast food chain Giraffas.

In 2026, the characters in the series won miniatures given at the Brazilian affiliate Domino's Pizza.

=== Film ===
The 2023 film Dungeons & Dragons: Honor Among Thieves featured adult versions of Hank, Bobby, Sheila, Diana, Eric and Presto in live-action cameos with Edgar Abram as Hank, Luke Bennett as Bobby, Emer McDaid as Sheila, Moe Sasegbon as Diana, Trevor Kaneswaran as Eric, and Seamus O'Hara as Presto. They are seen competing in a special tournament in Neverwinter and have made it to a cage in the middle of a shifting labyrinth.

==== Stop-motion short film ====
In December 2024 during CCXP, the Brazilian blog Jovem Nerd and Hasbro announced a stop-motion animated short based on the series called "O Episódio Perdido" (The Lost Episode).

=== Video games ===
Between 2024 and 2025, the characters from the animated series were also added to Idle Champions of the Forgotten Realms as playable champions.
