= Short-Fuze (G.I. Joe) =

G.I. Joe character

Short Fuze
- G.I. Joe character
- Illustration of Short-Fuze from G.I. Joe: Order of Battle. Art by Herb Trimpe.
- First appearance: 1982
- Voiced by: Frank Welker (Sunbow/Marvel)

In-universe information
- Affiliation: G.I. Joe
- Specialty: Mortar Soldier
- File name: Freistadt, Eric W.
- Birth place: Chicago, IL
- SN: RA380225432
- Rank: E-4 (Corporal) (1982); E-5 (Sergeant) (1997); E-6 (Staff Sergeant) (Devil's Due comics)
- Primary MOS: Artillery
- Secondary MOS: Infantry Engineer
- Subgroups: Night Force

Short-Fuze (also released as Short-Fuse) is a fictional character from the G.I. Joe: A Real American Hero toyline, comic books and animated series. He is the G.I. Joe Team's original mortar soldier and debuted in 1982.

== Profile ==
His real name is Eric W. Friestadt, and his rank is that of corporal E-4. Short-Fuze was born in Chicago, Illinois.

His primary military specialty is artillery and his secondary military specialty is infantry engineer. Short-Fuze is logical and sensitive. He also has a noticeable temper, hence his code-name. Short-Fuze was born into a military family, as his father and grandfather were both career Top Sergeants. He enjoys working on abstract mathematics and is able to plot artillery azimuths and triangulations just in his head. Short-Fuze received advanced infantry training, and specialized education in artillery school and engineer school. He is a qualified expert with the M-14, M-16, M79 grenade launcher, M-2 60mm light mortar, M-1 81mm medium mortar, and the M1911A1 Auto Pistol.

== Toys ==
Short-Fuze was first released as an action figure in 1982.

== Comics ==
=== Marvel Comics ===
Short-Fuze is one of the original members of the team, appearing in the premiere, double-sized issue of G.I. Joe: A Real American Hero. All the Joes take part in an effort to rescue a peace activist that Cobra forces had kidnapped and taken to one of their many bases, this one an island separate from the more well-known Cobra Island. The activist is safely freed.

Short-Fuze plays a support role in a mission to investigate a Cobra stronghold in the middle of mid-town Manhattan. The Joes soon storm the building with things bad and despite their best efforts, Scarlett, Zap and Snake Eyes are kidnapped. They later free themselves. In this issue, the code-name is spelled with an s, 'Short-Fuse'.

Short-Fuze participates in the unsuccessful pursuit of Cobra Commander through the outskirts of Washington D.C.

A Joe team escorts the Cobra ninja Storm Shadow to the island prison of Alcatraz. Short-Fuze pilots the boat.

During a party celebrating the repair of Joe HQ, General Austin transfers Short-Fuze and all of the original G.I. Joe members to administrative duties; the newer men and women are to be field officers.

Like all Joes, Short-Fuze participates in the invasion of Springfield, a Cobra controlled town.

He later takes part in another invasion, this time of Cobra Island, a separate land mass, to help neutralize the Cobra civil war.

=== Devil's Due ===
Short-Fuze and the Joes invade the island for a second time as Serpentor had used it to establish an army that answered only to him. Short-Fuze is a support character in the flashback series G.I.Joe: Declassified that examines the early days of the Joe team. He is known for his poor inter-personal skills.

== Animated series ==
=== Sunbow ===
He first appeared in the G.I. Joe animated series in the A Real American Hero mini-series. He was voiced by Frank Welker. In the mini-series, he was generally featured alongside another Joe, Steeler; for example, the two teamed with Clutch to create a killer satellite that was used unsuccessfully to destroy the Relay Star Satellite. He later paired up with Steeler again to man a copter during "Operation Big Lift".

In the "Revenge of Cobra" mini-series, Short-Fuze is one of the Joes who deliver Cobra Commander to Blackwater Prison and then try to recapture him when Zartan breaks him out. He also is part of the defense of Washington DC.

In the episode "Battle for the Train of Gold", Short-Fuze is part of a group of Joes who battle Cobra in the terrorist group's attempt to steal all the gold in Fort Knox. When the Joes have to chase Cobra on horseback, Short-Fuze is one of those who have trouble getting on their horse.

==== G.I. Joe: The Movie ====
Short-Fuze is seen briefly taking part in the battle at the Statue of Liberty in the opening to G.I. Joe: The Movie.
