= Tony Christopher (businessman) =

American businessman (born 1952)

- Born: Anthony Earl Christopher; June 14, 1952 (age 74); Santa Barbara, California
- Education: California Institute of the Arts
- Occupations: Co-founder, CEO and president of Landmark Entertainment Group

Anthony Earl Christopher (born June 14, 1952) is the CEO and president of Landmark Entertainment Group. He creates, directs, designs, and produces theatrical live entertainment and indoor and outdoor themed entertainment attractions.

== Early career ==
Christopher attended the California Institute of the Arts (CalArts), where he received his B.F.A. in Theatre and Dance in 1974. After graduating, he was hired by Robert F. Jani, then vice president of entertainment for Disneyland and Walt Disney World, where Christopher was an actor, stage manager and choreographer on "The Kids of the Kingdom" and the "Hoop-Dee-Doo Musical Review" at Walt Disney World's Pioneer Hall.

Christopher was appointed artistic director of the World Showcase Theatre at Epcot. When the project was cancelled, he left Disney and returned to Los Angeles, and subsequently performed as an actor, singer and dancer on Broadway and television. In 1980, he co-founded The Landmark Entertainment Group with former Disney associate Gary Goddard.

== Theme parks and attractions ==
- The Amazing Adventures of Spider-Man (at Islands of Adventure, and Universal Studios Japan)
- Terminator 2/3D: Battle Across Time (at Universal Studios Florida, Universal Studios Hollywood, and Universal Studios Japan)
- Jurassic Park: The Ride (Universal Studios Hollywood, Islands of Adventure, and Universal Studios Japan)
- Conan: A Sword and Sorcery Spectacular (Universal Studios Hollywood)
- Kongfrontation (Universal Studios Hollywood)
- Enchanted Kingdom (Philippines)
- Floraland (Chengdu, PRC)
- Harmonyland Theme Park (Ohita, Japan)
- Sanrio Puroland (Tokyo, Japan)
- Star Trek: The Experience (Las Vegas Hilton)
- Kung Fu Theme Park, WuDang Mountain, PRC

== Resorts and casinos ==
- The Venetian Hotel and Casino (Las Vegas)
- Caesars Palace Hotel and Casino (Las Vegas)
- MGM Grand Hotel and Casino (Las Vegas)
- Table Bay Hotel (Cape Town, South Africa)

== Retail ==
- The Forum Shops at Caesars Palace
- M & M's World (Las Vegas)
- Hershey's Chocolate World (Pennsylvania)
- Sanrio Gallery
- Star Trek Retail

== Theatre and entertainment ==
For decades Christopher served as an active member of the League of American Theatres and Producers, now known as The Broadway League and Stage Directors and Choreographers Society (SDC), producing long running Broadway hit, Strange Case of Dr Jekyll and Mr Hyde "Jekyll and Hyde"," "Sherlock's Last Case". Tony Christopher conceived and wrote with Gary Goddard and Ted King the acclaimed Las Vegas spectacular "EFX!". In 1992, Christopher produced, choreographed, and directed the 20th Anniversary National Tour of Broadway's "Jesus Christ Superstar". After touring for four years, the production grossed over $140 million and is now known as the most successful Broadway revival of all time.

In television, Christopher co-created and directed several television shows including Captain Power and the Soldiers of the Future for Mattel, "Mega Babies" for Fox Family and Skeleton Warriors for Playmates Toys and CBS.

- Jekyll and Hyde (1997 Plymouth Theatre)
- Tru (1989 Booth Theatre)
- Sherlock's Last Case (1987 Nederlander Theatre)
- The Rolling Stones - Bridges to Babylon Tour
- Jesus Christ Superstar 20th Anniversary National Tour
- Teenage Mutant Ninja Turtles Touring Show
- EFX (MGM Grand Hotel)
- Phantom of the Opera (Venetian Hotel)
- Caesars Magical Empire

== Awards and honors ==
- 1986: Grammy Award Nominee for Best Music Video
- 1990: Tony Award Nominee for "Tru" starring Robert Morse
- 1997: Tony Award Nominee for "Jekyll and Hyde"
- 1990–2000: Several Themed Entertainment Association (TEA) awards for Terminator 2/3D: Battle Across Time, Jurassic Park and Star Trek, The Experience

== See also ==
- Landmark Entertainment Group
