= Katherine Lawrence =

American writer

- Born: Katherine Selbert; December 11, 1954; San Bernardino, California, U.S.
- Died: March 25, 2004 (aged 49); San Pedro River, near Tucson, Arizona, U.S.
- Occupations: Screenwriter; author; writer

Katherine "Kathy" Lawrence (December 11, 1954 – March 25, 2004) was an American television series screenwriter, author of children's non-fiction educational books and a short story, science fiction and video game writer.

== Biography ==
Lawrence was born Katherine Selbert on December 11, 1954. She received her Bachelor of Arts degree in the English language from the University of Washington in Seattle.

She began her writing career in 1985 on the series Dungeons & Dragons, billed as Kathy Selbert, the name which she would use through the rest of the decade. In 1990, she chose her writing name of Katherine Lawrence because of her love for T. E. Lawrence and Jerome Lawrence, and she used that name professionally for all her subsequent writing work. In 1996, Lawrence was nominated for Outstanding Script by the Writers Guild of America for "Icebound", an episode of Hypernauts, a live-action science fiction series.

Lawrence suffered from chronic fatigue syndrome. On March 27, 2004, her body was found at San Pedro River in Arizona, along with a suicide note. Lawrence was 49 years old, and her death was apparently caused by a self-inflicted gunshot wound. Her ashes were spread over Mount Lemmon, which was her favorite area. In her farewell note, she wrote, "It's been a good life. I've vastly exceeded my teenage dreams. 'Tis sufficient."

== Writing credits ==
=== Television ===
- Dungeons & Dragons (1985)
- MoonDreamers (1986)
- Bionic Six (1987)
- Muppet Babies (1987)
- Beetlejuice (1991)
- Conan the Adventurer (1992–1993)
- Biker Mice from Mars (1994)
- Mighty Max (1994)
- Darkstalkers (1995)
- G.I. Joe Extreme (1996)
- Hypernauts (1996)
- Princess Gwenevere and the Jewel Riders (1996)
- ReBoot (1998)
- Shadow Raiders (1998)
- Roswell Conspiracies: Aliens, Myths and Legends (1999)
- Kong: The Animated Series (2000)
- X-Men: Evolution (2000)
- Stargate Infinity (2002–2003)
- Legend of the Dragon (2006)

=== Film ===
- The Secret of Mulan (1998)

=== Video games ===
- Mario is Missing! (1993)
- Inherit the Earth: Quest for the Orb (1994)
- This Means War! (1995)
- Battle Vision (1997)

=== Books ===
- Jean Claude Van Damme, Martial Arts Masters series, Rosen Publishing (2002)
- Life in the Desert, Life in Extreme Environments series, Rosen Publishing (2004)
- Laurence Yep, The Library of Author Biographies, Rosen Publishing (2004)
- Labor Legislation, The Struggle to Gain Rights for America's Workforce, Rosen Publishing (2006)

=== Short stories ===
- The Forest's Not for Burning, in Enchanted Forests, Katharine Kerr and Martin H. Greenberg, editors (1995)
- The Tarnished Soul, in The Ultimate Silver Surfer, Stan Lee, editor (1995)
- The Silicon Sword, in The Shimmering Door, Katharine Kerr, Editor (1996)
