= Ræder =

Ræder or Raeder is a surname. Notable people with the surname include:

- Anton Ræder (1855–1941), Norwegian philologist and historian
- Cap Raeder (born 1953), American former ice hockey goaltender and coach
- Carl Gustav Valdemar Ræder (1837–1887), Danish farmer and writer
- Einar Ræder (1896–1976), Norwegian long jumper
- Erich Raeder (1876–1960), naval leader in Germany who played a major role in the naval history of World War II
- Georg Ræder (1814–1898), Norwegian military officer, railway pioneer and politician
- Jacques Ræder (1831–1920), Norwegian military officer
- Johan Christopher Ræder (1859–1943), Norwegian military officer
- Johan Christopher Ræder (1782–1853) (1782–1853), Norwegian military officer
- Johan Georg A. Ræder (1905–1981), Norwegian diplomat
- Johan Georg Frederik Ræder (1834–1909), Danish civil servant and writer
- Johan Georg Raeder (1889–1959), Norwegian ophthalmologist known for his studies on glaucoma
- Johan Georg Ræder (1751–1808) (1751–1808), Norwegian military officer
- Lukas Raeder (born 1993), German footballer
- Nicolai Ditlev Ammon Ræder (1817–1884), Norwegian jurist and politician
- Ole Munch Ræder (1815–1895), Norwegian jurist and diplomatist
- Oscar Alexander Ræder (1844–1877), Danish writer
- Peter Nicolay Ræder (born 1943), Norwegian diplomat
- Rudolf Falck Ræder (1881–1951), Norwegian military officer, engineer and politician for the Liberal Left Party

== See also ==
- Rader, a surname
- Rayder, a surname
- Reder, a surname
- Rehder, a surname
