= Rader =

Rader is a German surname and may refer to:

- Abbey Rader (1943–2025), American jazz drummer and composer
- Andrew Rader, Canadian aerospace engineer
- Brad Rader, American comic book writer
- Bruce Rader (born 1954), American broadcaster
- Daniel Rader, American professor
- Danny Rader (born 1981), American musician
- Dave Rader (disambiguation)
- David Rader (born 1957), American football coach
- Dean Rader, American writer
- Dennis Rader (born 1945), American serial killer
- Don Rader (disambiguation)
- Dotson Rader (born 1942), American playwright
- Doug Rader (born 1944), American baseball player
- Drew Rader (1901–1975), American baseball player
- Erich Raeder (1876–1960), German admiral
- Frank Rader (1848–1897), American politician
- Gary Rader (1944–1973), American army officer
- Howie Rader (1921–1991), American basketball player
- Jack Rader, American politician
- Jason Rader (born 1981), American football player
- John Rader (born 1927), American politician
- Kevin Rader (disambiguation)
- L. E. Rader (1864–1910), American politician
- Len Rader (1921–1996), American basketball player
- Lloyd E. Rader Sr. (1906–1986), American politician
- Marie Rader (born 1941), American politician
- Matthew Rader (1561–1634), Italian philologist
- Melvin Rader (1903–1981), American author
- Michael Rader, American actor
- Moira Rader, American politician
- Paul Rader (born 1934), American religious leader
- Paul Rader (evangelist) (1878–1938), American evangelist
- Peary Rader (1909–1991), American bodybuilder
- Randall Ray Rader (born 1949), American judge
- Richard Rader (born 1959), U.S. Virgin Island equestrian
- Ripley Rader, American fashion designer
- Stanley Rader (1930–2002), American attorney
- Stephanie Rader (1915–2016), American undercover agent
- Tristan Rader, American politician
- William C. Rader (born 1938), American psychiatrist

== See also ==
- Lori Rader-Day, American author of mystery, crime, and suspense novels
- Rader, Missouri, a community in the United States
- Rader's FFT algorithm, fast Fourier transform algorithm that computes the discrete Fourier transform of prime sizes
- Ræder, a surname
- Rayder, a surname
- Reder, a surname
- Rehder, a surname
