= Johan Ræder =

Johan Ræder is the name of:

- Johan Georg Ræder (1751–1808), military officer
- Johan Christopher Ræder (1782–1853), military officer
- Johan Philip Thomas Ræder (1795–1869), military officer
- Johan Georg Frederik Ræder (1834–1909), civil servant
- Georg Ræder, Johan Georg Ræder, (1857–1932), military officer
- Johan Christopher Ræder (1859–1943), military officer
- Johan Georg Ræder (1889–1959), ophthalmologist
- Johan Georg Alexius Ræder (1905–1981), diplomat
