= Raider =

Raider(s) may refer to:

== Arts and entertainment ==
=== Characters and concepts ===
- Cylon Raider, a fighter spacecraft in various Battlestar Galactica TV series and movies
- Raiders (comics), three Marvel Comics characters
- Raider, a G.I. Joe: A Real American Hero toy vehicle
- Raiders, a term for bandits and highwaymen in the video game series Fallout
- Raider, a Viking warrior in the video game For Honor

=== Film ===
- Western Approaches (film), a 1944 film alternatively titled The Raider
- The Raiders (1963 film), an American western directed by Herschel Daugherty
- Raiders of the Lost Ark, often referred to simply as Raiders
- Raiders!: The Story of the Greatest Fan Film Ever Made, a 2015 documentary about three fans who recreated Raiders of the Lost Ark

=== Literature ===
- The Raiders, an 1894 novel by S. R. Crockett
- The Raider, a 1929 novel by Charles Alden Seltzer
- "The Raider", a poem from the 1951 collection Wine of Wonder by Lilith Lorraine
- The Raiders, a 1955 novel by William E. Wilson
- "The Raider", a 1958 short story by Don Berry
- The Raider, a 1981 novel by Walter Jon Williams, Volume III of the Privateers and Gentlemen series
- Raider (novel), a 1995 novel by Susan Gates
- The Raiders, a 1995 novel by Harold Robbins, sequel novel to The Carpetbaggers
- The Raiders, a 1996 novel by Garry Kilworth

=== Music ===
- Paul Revere & the Raiders, an American rock band
- "Raider", a track from the 1969 album Farewell Aldebaran, by Judy Henske and Jerry Yester
- "Raiders", a track from the 1987 album Young and Free, by Rock Goddess

=== Television ===
- The Raider, an American television play
- "Raiders", The Bill series 8, episode 58 (1992)
- "The Raider", Combat! season 4, episode 16 (1965)
- "The Raider", Stagecoach West episode 31 (1961)
- "The Raiders", 77 Sunset Strip season 5, episode 4 (1962)
- "The Raiders", Born Free episode 12 (1974)
- "The Raiders", Broken Arrow season 1, episode 12 (1956)
- "The Raiders", Custer episode 16 (1967)
- "The Raiders", Dr. Finlay's Casebook series 3, episode 2 (1965)
- "The Raiders", Richard the Lionheart episode 32 (1963)
- "The Raiders", Spyforce episode 32 (1932)
- "The Raiders", The Buccaneers episode 2 (1956)

=== Video games ===
- Splatoon Raiders, a 2026 spin-off game for the Nintendo Switch 2

== Sports teams ==
=== Australia ===
- Adelaide Raiders, a football (soccer) club in Adelaide, South Australia
- Canberra Raiders, a National Rugby League team based in Canberra
- Toowoomba Raiders FC, a football (soccer) club from Toowoomba, Queensland
- Wodonga Raiders Football Club, a football (soccer) club in Wodonga, New South Wales

=== Canada ===
- Georgetown Raiders, a Junior "A" ice hockey team from Georgetown, Ontario
- Georgetown Raiders (senior), a former ice hockey team from Georgetown, Ontario
- Kingston Raiders, a junior ice hockey team in the Ontario Hockey League for the 1988–1989 season only
- Napanee Raiders, a Canadian Junior ice hockey team based in Napanee, Ontario
- Nepean Raiders, a Junior ice hockey team from Nepean, Ontario
- Ontario Raiders, a National Lacrosse League during the 1998 season
- Preston Raiders, a former (1965–1977) Canadian Junior "B" ice hockey team from Preston (now Cambridge), Ontario
- Prince Albert Raiders, a major junior ice hockey team based in Prince Albert, Saskatchewan
- Wexford Raiders, former name (1983–2006) of the Toronto Jr. Canadiens, a Junior "A" ice hockey team from Downsview, Ontario
- Raiders, the teams of Delhi District Secondary School, Ontario

=== New Zealand ===
- Hibiscus Coast Raiders, a rugby league club based on the Hibiscus Coast
- Waitakere City Raiders, rugby league club based in Waitakere City from 1994 to 1996

=== United Kingdom ===
- Barrow Raiders, an English rugby league team
- Bournemouth Raiders, a former American football team
- London Raiders, a slowpitch softball club based in London, England
- Plymouth Raiders, a British Basketball League team
- Romford Raiders, an English Premier Ice Hockey League based in Romford, London
- Telford Raiders, a rugby league club based in Telford, Shropshire, England
- Wightlink Raiders, an ice hockey team based in Ryde on the Isle of Wight, England

=== United States ===
==== Professional ====
- Las Vegas Raiders, an American football team based in Las Vegas, Nevada, formerly the Oakland Raiders
- Northern Raiders, a rugby league team based in Upstate New York
- Racine Raiders, an American football team based in Racine, Wisconsin
- Richmond Raiders, an indoor football team 2010–2016 based in Richmond, Virginia
- Rochester Raiders, an indoor football team 2006–2014 based in Rochester, New York
- Salem Raiders, an ice hockey team 1980–1982 based in Salem, Virginia
- Virginia Raiders, an ice hockey team 1982–1983 based in Salem, Virginia

==== Collegiate ====
- Colgate Raiders, the athletics teams of Colgate University, Hamilton, New York
- Southern Oregon Raiders, the athletic teams of Southern Oregon University, Ashland, Oregon
- Wright State Raiders, the athletics teams of Wright State University, Dayton, Ohio
- Milwaukee School of Engineering Raiders, the athletics teams from Milwaukee School of Engineering, Milwaukee, Wisconsin
- Rose State College Raiders, the athletics teams of Rose State College, Midwest City, Oklahoma
- Moorpark College Raiders, the athletics teams of Moorpark College, Moorpark, California

==== High school ====
- Plant City Raiders, the teams of Plant City High School, Plant City, Florida
- Lumberton Raiders, the teams of Lumberton High School (Lumberton, Texas)
- St. Thomas Aquinas Raiders, the teams of St. Thomas Aquinas High School (Fort Lauderdale, Florida)
- Roosevelt Raiders, the teams of Eleanor Roosevelt High School (Maryland)
- Flushing Raiders, the teams of Flushing High School (Michigan)
- Portland Raiders, the teams of Portland High School (Michigan)
- Seneca Valley Raiders, the teams of Seneca Valley Senior High School
- Hudson Raiders, the teams of Hudson High School, Wisconsin
- Glenbard South Raiders, the teams of Glenbard South High School
- Navarre Raiders, the teams of Navarre High School, Florida
- Rockledge Raiders, the teams of Rockledge High School, Florida
- Archbishop Ryan Raiders, the teams of Archbishop Ryan High School, Philadelphia, Pennsylvania
- Warwick Raiders, the teams of Warwick High School, Newport News, Virginia
- Reynoldsburg Raiders, the teams of Reynoldsburg High School, Reynoldsburg, Ohio
- Atholton Raiders, the teams of Atholton High School, Columbia, Maryland
- Walton Raiders, the teams of George Walton Comprehensive High School, Marietta, Georgia

=== Elsewhere ===
- Swarco Raiders Tirol, a semi-professional American football club based in Innsbruck, Austria
- Bydgoszcz Raiders, an American football team based in Bydgoszcz, Poland

== Military uses ==
- HMS Raider, several Royal Navy ships
- Marine Raiders, an elite, special operations US Marine Corps unit
- Merchant raider, a type of ship in naval warfare
- Northrop YC-125 Raider, a 1940s American three-engined STOL utility transport
- Sikorsky S-97 Raider, a high-speed scout and attack compound helicopter
- Northrop Grumman B-21 Raider, an American strategic bomber under development for the US Air Force
- Raider battalions, elite infantry units of the Indonesian Army

== Vehicles ==
- Dodge Raider, a rebadged Mitsubishi Montero sold by Dodge
- Mitsubishi Raider, a rebadged Dodge Dakota sold by Mitsubishi Motors
- Suzuki Raider 150, a motorcycle
- Raider, a custom version of the Yamaha XV1900A motorcycle
- A brand of skid loader

== Other uses ==
- Brad Rader, who has signed artwork as simply "Raider"
- Raider, the name of the Twix chocolate bar in several European countries until the 1990s
- HTC Raider 4G, a smartphone released in South Korea in 2011

== See also ==
- Ræder, a surname
- Rayder, a surname
- Reder, a surname
- Rehder, a surname
