= General Ræder =

General Ræder may refer to:

- Georg Ræder (1814–1898), Norwegian Army lieutenant general
- Jacques Ræder (1831–1920), Norwegian Army major general
- Johan Christopher Ræder (1859–1943), Norwegian Army major general

== See also ==
- Paul Rader (born 1934), 15th General of the Salvation Army
- General reader
