= Oscar Alexander Ræder =

Danish writer

Oscar Alexander Ræder (12 June 1844 – 16 November 1877) was a Danish writer.

He was born in Copenhagen as a son of Colonel Jacob Thode Ræder (1798–1853). He was a brother of Carl Gustav Valdemar Ræder and Johan Georg Frederik Ræder, grandson of Johan Georg Ræder, a nephew of Johan Christopher Ræder, Nicolai Ditlev Amund Ræder and Johan Philip Thomas Ræder, a first cousin of Jacques Ræder, Ole Munch Ræder, Nicolai Ditlev Ammon Ræder and Johan Georg Ræder and an uncle of Hans Henning Ræder. In September 1874 he married Agnes Elise Albertha Helsted, a daughter of Frederik Ferdinand Helsted. After Oscar's death she married Johan Georg Frederik Ræder.

He finished his secondary education at Copenhagen Metropolitan School i 1862, and graduated in history in 1866. He issued the historical-philosophical works Om den hellige og profane Historie in 1870, Historiske Love in 1871, De tyske og nordiske Nationer in 1873 and Om de uhistoriske og historiske Folk in 1875. He tried to take the doctorate with the latter book, but failed. He gave up historiography, and travelled to Rome where he became vice consul for Denmark, Sweden and Norway. He died in November 1877.
