= Johan Georg Ræder (1751–1808) =

Norwegian military officer (1751–1808)

Johan Georg Ræder (2 August 1751 – 13 November 1808) was a Norwegian military officer.

== Personal life ==
He was born on 2 August 1751, in Meldal, to Johan Christopher Rhäder and his second wife Cathrine Margrethe Riiber. He was the grandson of Johan Georg Rhäder, the person who immigrated to Norway and started the family branch there. In February 1782 in Copenhagen he married Catharina Margrethe Lind (1759–1820). They had nine children, including the sons Johan Christopher Ræder (1782–1853), Nicolai Ditlev Amund Ræder (1790–1867), Johan Philip Thomas Ræder (1795–1869), Jacob Thode Ræder (1798–1853) and Severin Henrik Ræder (1800–1878). He was the grandfather of Jacques Ræder, Ole Munch Ræder, Nicolai Ditlev Ammon Ræder and Johan Georg Ræder and great-grandfather of Anton Henrik Ræder, Johan Christopher Ræder and Rudolf Falck Ræder. In Denmark he had the grandsons Carl Gustav Valdemar Ræder, Johan Georg Frederik Ræder and Oscar Alexander Ræder and great-grandson Hans Henning Ræder.

He lived at Nes near Veblungsnes from 1787 to 1806, then in Orkdalsøra until leaving to fight in the war in 1808. Also in 1808, he contracted illness which developed into gall fever. He died in November 1808 in Kongsvinger.

== Career ==
He took his military education in Copenhagen, and from 1787 to his death he served in the Trondhjemske Regiment. He headed the Romsdalske Kompani from 1787, the 2nd Battalion from 1804 and then the 3rd Battalion from 1806. His forces were employed in the Theater War without entering battle, and in the Dano-Swedish War (1808–1809). Already from 1807, at the outbreak of the Gunboat War, his forces were in active garrison in Trondhjem. In the war of 1808–1809, Ræder had notable roles in the victorious Battle of Trangen and the non-victorious Skirmish of Mobekk. He reached the rank of second lieutenant in 1769, premier lieutenant in 1782, captain in 1787, major in 1804 and lieutenant colonel in 1808. In 1808, he was also decorated as a Knight of the Order of the Dannebrog. He died, and Carl Oscar Munthe called it the biggest loss of a single man in the war.
