= Carl Gustav Valdemar Ræder =

Carl Gustav Valdemar Ræder (16 July 1837 – 21 December 1887) was a Danish farmer and writer.

He was born in Copenhagen as a son of Colonel Jacob Thode Ræder (1798–1853). He was a brother of Johan Georg Frederik Ræder and Oscar Alexander Ræder, grandson of Johan Georg Ræder, a nephew of Johan Christopher Ræder, Nicolai Ditlev Amund Ræder and Johan Philip Thomas Ræder, a first cousin of Jacques Ræder, Ole Munch Ræder, Nicolai Ditlev Ammon Ræder and Johan Georg Ræder and an uncle of Hans Henning Ræder. In May 1866 he married Bertha Othilie Aarestrup.

He grew up in Altona, where his mother's family hailed from, returned to Copenhagen in 1848 before taking his agricultural training and education in Mecklenburg, Lauenburg/Elbe, Jena and Tirsbæk. He bought a farm in Kolding in 1862, and in addition to farming he made his mark as a writer. He issued Landøkonomiske Breve (1878-1879), Socialøkonomiske Betragtninger med særligt Hensyn til Agerbruget (1880), Udvandringsspørgsmaalet (1882) and Landbrugets nationale Betydning (1883).
