= Johan Georg Frederik Ræder =

Danish civil servant and writer

Johan Georg Frederik Ræder (16 August 1834 – 1909) was a Danish civil servant and writer.

He was born in Copenhagen as a son of Colonel Jacob Thode Ræder (1798–1853). He was a brother of Carl Gustav Valdemar Ræder and Oscar Alexander Ræder, grandson of Johan Georg Ræder, a nephew of Johan Christopher Ræder, Nicolai Ditlev Amund Ræder and Johan Philip Thomas Ræder and a first cousin of Jacques Ræder, Ole Munch Ræder, Nicolai Ditlev Ammon Ræder and Johan Georg Ræder. In 1869 he had the son Hans Henning Ræder. His first marriage was to Birgitte Cathinka von Holstein, a daughter of Ulrik Adolf von Holstein. She died in 1874, and he then married Agnes Elise Albertha Ræder, the widow of his brother Oscar. She was a daughter of Frederik Ferdinand Helsted.

He enrolled as a law student in 1853 and graduated with the law degree in 1860. He was hired in the Ministry of the Duchy of Schleswig. In 1861 he became county secretary in Tønder County, but when the Second Schleswig War broke out in 1864 he had to flee. He returned to the Ministry of the Duchy of Schleswig, and was hired in the Magistrate of Copenhagen in 1872. He advanced in the ranks here, and received the honorary title Councillor of Justice (Danish: Justitsråd). He issued the historical work Danmark under Svend Estridsen og hans Sønner in 1871, and the judicial handbook Forsørgelse af trængende efter dansk Ret in 1892. He died in 1909.
