= Raid =

Raid, RAID or Raids may refer to:

== Attacks ==
- Raid (military), a sudden attack without the intent to hold ground
- Corporate raid, a type of hostile takeover in business
- Panty raid, a prankish raid by male college students on the living quarters of female students to steal panties as trophies
- Police raid, a police action involving the entering of premises with the intent to capture personnel or evidence
- Union raid, when an outsider trade union takes over the membership of an existing union

== Arts, entertainment, and media ==
=== Films ===
- Raid (1947 film), an East German film
- Raid (2003 film), a 2003 Finnish film
- The Raid (2011 film), an Indonesian action and period crime thriller
  - The Raid 2, its 2014 sequel
- Raid (2018 film), an Indian period crime thriller by Raj Kumar Gupta
  - Raid 2 (2025 film), its sequel
- Raid (2023 film)

=== Gaming ===
- Raid (video games), a type of mission in a video game where a large number of people combine forces to defeat a powerful enemy
- Silent Assault, also known as Raid, a Nintendo Entertainment System title released by Sachen in 1989
- Raid over Moscow, a 1984 computer game re-released as Raid
- Raid: World War II, a 2017 computer game
- Raid: Shadow Legends, a 2018 mobile game
- Raid, in context of Twitch and other live streaming services, bringing a group of viewers from one channel to a target channel

=== Other uses in arts, entertainment, and media ===
- Raid (band), a Tennessee-based band, who helped pioneer the Vegan straight edge movement
- "Raid", a song by Lakeside on the album Untouchables
- R.A.I.D., a branch of the fictional Marvel Comics terrorist group Advanced Idea Mechanics

== Sports ==
- Raid (boating), a leisure pursuit combining sailing and rowing
- Rally raid, a form of off-road motorsport
- Rebreather Association of International Divers, a dive training organization

== Other uses ==
- Raid (surname), Estonian surname
- RAID (Redundant Array of Independent Disks), a data storage technology providing redundancy
- RAID (French police unit), Recherche, Assistance, Intervention, Dissuasion, an anti-terrorist unit of the French National Police
- Raid (insecticide), a consumer insecticide marketed by S. C. Johnson & Son
- Real-Time Adversarial Intelligence & Decision-making, a DARPA project to perform predictive analysis of enemy behavior
- RAID (in mental health), Reinforce Appropriate, Implode Disruptive, is a positive psychology least restrictive practice approach for working with people who exhibit challenging behavior
- Raids, Manche, France, a commune

== See also ==
- The Raid (disambiguation)
- Raider (disambiguation)
- Raiding (disambiguation)
- Raid 2 (disambiguation)
- Raed (Arabic: Rā'id), a given name (including a list of people with the name)
- Raid dingue, a 2016 French comedy film
