= Zee Cine Award for Best Performance in a Negative Role =

Film award in India

Zee Cine Award for Best Actor in a Negative Role
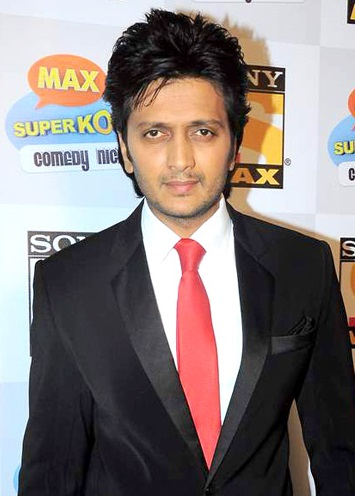
- The 2026 recipient: Riteish Deshmukh
- Awarded for: Best Performance by an Actor in a Negative Role
- Country: India
- Presented by: Zee Entertainment Enterprises
- First award: Kajol, Gupt: The Hidden Truth (1998)
- Currently held by: Riteish Deshmukh, Raid 2 (2026)

The Zee Cine Award for Best Actor in a Negative Role is presented by Zee Entertainment Enterprises to recognize outstanding performances by actors portraying antagonists. Winners are selected by a jury and announced at the annual Zee Cine Awards ceremony.

Ashutosh Rana and Bobby Deol share the record for the most wins in this category, with two awards each. Notably, both actors won in consecutive years—Rana in 1999 and 2000, and Deol in 2023 and 2024.

Kajol was the first female recipient of this award, followed by Supriya Pathak and Tabu in subsequent years.

== Multiple wins ==
Wins	Recipient
2	Ashutosh Rana
2	Bobby Deol

== Awards ==
The winners are listed below:-

Year	Winner	Film	Ref.
1998	Kajol	Gupt: The Hidden Truth	
1999	Ashutosh Rana	Dushman	
2000	Ashutosh Rana	Sangharsh	
2001	Sushant Singh	Jungle	
2002	Aftab Shivdasani	Kasoor	
2003	Ajay Devgan	Deewangee	
2004	Rahul Dev	Footpath	
2005	John Abraham	Dhoom	
2006	Nana Patekar	Apaharan	
2007	Saif Ali Khan	Omkara	
2008	Arjun Rampal	Om Shanti Om	
2009	Not Held		
2010	Not Held		
2011	Ronit Roy	Udaan	
2012	Prakash Raj	Singham	
2013	Rishi Kapoor	Agneepath	
2014	Supriya Pathak	Goliyon Ki Raasleela Ram-Leela	
2015	Not Held		
2016	Nawazuddin Siddiqui	Badlapur	
2017	Jim Sarbh	Neerja	
2018	Raj Arjun	Secret Superstar	
2019	Tabu	Andhadhun	
2020	Manoj Pahwa	Article 15	
2021	Not Held		
2022	Not Held		
2023	Bobby Deol	Love Hostel	
2024	Bobby Deol	Animal	
2025	Jaideep Ahlawat	Maharaj	
2026	Riteish Deshmukh	Raid 2	

== See also ==
- Zee Cine Awards
- Bollywood
- Cinema of India
