= Roswell Conspiracies: Aliens, Myths and Legends =

1999 animated TV series

- Genre: Science fiction; Mystery; Action
- Created by: Kaaren Lee Brown
- Written by: Bob Forward; Greg Johnson
- Directed by: Brad Rader
- Starring: Eli Gabay; L. Harvey Gold; Saffron Henderson; Janyse Jaud; Peter Kelamis; Scott McNeil; Richard Newman; Lee Tockar; Alec Willows; Dale Wilson; Alex Zahara
- Composer: Allen Bohbot
- Countries of origin: United States; Canada
- No. of episodes: 40

Production
- Executive producers: Allen Bohbot; Joe Pearson; Rick Ungar
- Producer: Stephanie Graziano
- Running time: 30 Minutes
- Production companies: BKN Studios; BKN Entertainment

Original release
- Network: Syndication (BKN - U.S.) (YTV - Canada)
- Release: August 27, 1999 – June 3, 2000

Roswell Conspiracies: Aliens, Myths and Legends is an animated television series that originally aired as part of BKN's cartoon programing block. The show's premise was that aliens had been living among humans for ages, and were the origins of many of the creatures humans know from myth, folklore and legends, including vampires and werewolves. The show was produced in part of BKN's drive to reinvent itself as a children's block and company in general.

In October 2019, it was announced that 41 Entertainment would produce an eight-episode computer-generated animation reboot of the series, which was scheduled to premiere in fall 2021 but has since been delayed indefinitely.

== Overview ==
On the show, the Roswell incident which is part of a conspiracy theory is portrayed as being a man made phenomenon. It was set up by humans to deflect popular attention from the truth. The unidentified flying object was a prop; the body of a little green or grey man was a dummy; the witnesses to the crash were plants; as were the Air Force investigators. In fact the whole shadow world surrounding Area 51 was nothing but a distraction from the fact that the aliens had landed long ago and there were known incidents of their desire to attack, assimilate and/or destroy the human race.

These known incidents could be found in legend, myth and folklore of beings so strange and alien that they became the fabric of what human beings thought of when they thought of being frightened; vampires, werewolves, banshees, manitou, evil spirits, etc. As human beings progressed into the Industrial Age the attacks seemed to lessen, but recently they have begun to go on the rise.

The story begins as Nick Logan, a bounty hunter, gets tapped to hunt down what he thinks is a regular bounty, but things don't stay regular for long. When his next bounty turns out to be a very unusual girl, he soon finds himself involved in something both incredibly outrageous but also potentially satisfying. There are aliens among us and he can possibly play a part in helping to protect the earth. His new circumstances could also help him discover the truth behind his biological father's disappearance. Raised and trained by a stepfather in the know, Nick is one of a few human beings born with an innate sense of seeing through alien deceptions; most of the aliens can morph into human form at will. This ability gives him a unique advantage. In time he discovers his father and grandfather shared this advantage too.

Nick ends up teaming with Sh'lainn Blaze, a rogue Banshee who wants to be the bridge that helps humans and her species co-exist on the planet together. The Banshee have not fared well in an age of cold iron and Sh'lainn seems aware that they are plotting some form of 'final' solution. Together they become agents under James Rinaker the current Executive Officer of The Global Alliance, an international agency responsible for keeping the secret from the public and keeping the aliens in check by preventing the more aggressive and volatile ones from hunting human beings.

== Characters ==
=== Main characters ===
Nick Logan (Alex Zahara): Former bounty hunter now newest Global Alliance Agent and part of the Detection Unit. Logan's father, Walter, disappeared during an unexplained alien encounter at Roswell, New Mexico; his grandfather was one of the original members of the Alliance. Nick was raised by his step-father never knowing at the time that his "play time" was secret training to fight aliens. Nick is capable of seeing through alien illusions. Nick is a rogue within the Alliance, seldom following procedure and taking many actions upon his own accord. Nick spends most of the series looking for his kidnapped step-father and searching for information on his real father's disappearance.

Sh'lainn Blaze (Janyse Jaud): A rebellious member of the Banshee clan, a race of aliens that landed in the British Isles around 527 BC. She, like her kind, possesses the ability to predict when someone will die. She can also levitate and emit energy streams. She's been targeted by Queen Mab. She becomes a new member of the Alliance and Nick's partner in the Detection Unit. As the series progresses it is clear that Nick and Sh'lainn develop a relationship. She ultimately forms a psychic bond with Nick when she brings his lost memories to the surface.

James Rinaker (L. Harvey Gold): The head of the Global Alliance and the executive responsible for staging the Roswell Incident. Rinaker is committed to protecting humans from the aliens among them and to preserving the secrecy of the Alliance - at any cost. Throughout the series Rinaker's agenda is to wipe out hostile alien factions and makes alliances with his enemies whenever it involved weakening another foe. This served only to further divide and weaken the alien factions. Toward the end of the series it is revealed that he is actually a Shadoen double agent and sub-commander named Wraith. He killed the real Rinaker in 1946 and absorbed his biological tissue to replicate his DNA. Wraith assumes complete command of the second Shadoen Multitude when he misled commander Keel into underestimating the humans, leading to the commander's personal ship to be hit by a nuclear warhead. Wraith is killed when the Shadoen Multitude fleet is wiped out by the EMP bomb.

Jefferson Trueblood (Eli Gabay): Sheriff of Roswell. He is the leader of the S.T.A.R. teams and Rinnaker's right-hand man. He is very skillful in combat and in the use of weapons. Trueblood's father was also one of the original members of the Global Alliance. Trueblood became the chief of his tribe following his great uncle, One Fox's, death during a Lycanthrope attempt to eradicate another alien race, the Kachina. He fights honorably and although he normally obeys Rinaker, he will take matters into his hands if he feels Rinaker's orders risk the lives of others. Rinaker's actions ultimately cause Trueblood to distrust the general and, at one point he stole the Lycanthrope EMP bomb from Rinaker and moved it to the vision cave at his native home in Arizona. When Rinaker reveals himself to be Shadoen, Trueblood intercedes when he is about to kill Nick. He sacrifices himself while fending off Wraith to allow Nick to escape.

Nema Perrera (Saffron Henderson): Recruited from Egyptian National Security. She's a weapons specialist who is paired with Fitz in the Detail Unit. Very logical and practical but with enough of a sense of humor to play Fitz's straight man in their friendly snarking. Her father is an archaeological professor and her mother is a geneticist and biologist who studies blood and body tissue from Egypt's mummies. It is also revealed that her family is descended from Egypt's Old Kingdom dynasties.

Simon "Fitz" Fitzpatrick (Peter Kelamis): An Ex-CIA agent with a wild imagination and the ability to convince anyone of anything. Fitz's assignment in the Detail Unit is to cover up any and all evidence of alien activity or the existence of the Alliance. Despite the fact he's not fully trained for combat, he comes across as easy going, slightly goofy, and can handle himself if the situation demands it.

=== Alliance operatives ===
Ti-Yet (Dale Wilson): A Guardian among the Yeti. He was responsible for the safety of his people and protecting their most valued possession from their sworn enemies. He eventually becomes integrated as an agent of the Alliance and becomes a great friend to Nick. First appearance: Episode 3 - Mountain Retreat.

Ms. Smith-Heisen: She is the liaison between the Alliance and the government, acting as sort of a director, but not superior to general Rinaker. She is the first to discover the second Shadoen Multitude Fleet approaching the Earth but was incapacitated by Rinikar before he tried to escape.

Keung Ling: A human agent within the Global Alliance with a thirst for power and attention. He temporarily shares control of his body with a Vodun named Babul, which enhances his abilities above the average human. Babul and Ling come to respect one another and act as a team. Babul assumes complete control over Ling to assist the Vodun when they take over the bunker but regrets his actions; Babul ultimately sacrifices himself to destroy the Vodun and to allow Ling to survive.

Dorian Wyrick: A former US marine and a close friend of Trueblood, he is a good soldier and a loyal agent to the Alliance. He rescues Ms. Smith-Heisen after she was assaulted by Rinaker upon discovering the Shadoen Fleet approaching Earth. He also forms part of the team that retrieves the EMP bomb, left in the vision cave by Trueblood.

Prof. Antonio Alascano: The section head among the scientists who develop the weapons, gadgets and vehicles used by the Alliance.

Dr. Marina Petrovic: The Alliance pathologist, an eccentric woman who has the task of eradicating alien viruses or find antidotes to vampires poisons.

Delfin Tabada: One of the most loyal men of Rinaker. He is a militant, grumpy, and rude torture expert put in charge of the Omega Level.

=== Enemies ===
Queen Mab (Saffron Henderson): The leader of the Banshee Clan. Almost a counterpart to Rinaker, she is determined that her people should survive and thrive on Earth - even if it means sabotaging and retarding human innovation, for technology is poisonous to Banshees. Mab banishes Sh'Lainn from their clan for joining the Alliance, also branding her as a traitor and target. The conflict with the Alliance as well as bitterness for Sh'Lainn leads Mab to even summon Minotauri warriors - a technological race previously sealed by the Banshee - in order to kill Sh'lainn, but her efforts were thwarted by Nick. In the end, she forgives Sh'lainn and welcomes her back into the Banshee Sisterhood. First appearance: Episode 1 - The Bait (Part 1).

Ruck (Scott McNeil): The werewolf pack leader. Relentless, resourceful, and a cunning liar, he takes any opportunity to continue his people's war with the Yeti. His only family is his son Athos, with whom he has a strained relationship - because of Athos' appearance and ideology. Ruck is an enemy of the Alliance throughout the series, but ultimately became one of their greatest heroes as he died aiding the new Alliance against the Shadoen's second invasion. Approaching the end of his life cycle, he and Nathan Boyar decided to pilot a hastily crafted ship equipped with an unstable beam cannon to destroy the invading fleet's primary weapon, along with many other Shadoen vessels. First appearance: Episode 3 - Mountain Retreat.

Hanek (Dale Wilson): Vampire Leader of a successful Vampire Family. He is calculating and extremely ambitious. Under the cover of his company, Intracom, he took control of the remaining Vampire clans on the West Coast after the events of Episode 5 - Peacemaker, and then expanded his control by taking over the Vampire clans on the East Coast after the events of Episode 17 - The Partnership. He is blinded in one eye and receives a scar following an attempted coup by the Vampire Valra. Hanek was killed by Nick Logan while attempting to use the life energies of Banshee to power teleporters. His second-in-command, Dorn, subsequently took over. First appearance: Episode 7 - The Roswell Incident.

Dorn (Lee Tockar): He is originally appointed by Hanek to assist the Alliance in capturing Valra. He becomes Hanek's second-in-command and takes over Intracom operations after Hanek was killed. His resolve for world domination was not as strong as Hanek's which allows him to consider the possibility of forming an alliance with the other alien races, including the Banshee. First appearance: Episode 23 - Vampire Amok.

Chauf (Richard Newman): A Golem who becomes the leader of the Conduit upon Kao Lin's death during an Alliance raid. He later attempts to bring Athos into the Conduit at his late mother's wishes. He is the brains behind managing to get the militant alien races such as the Vampires, the Lycanthropes, and the Banshee, to come together and form a coalition against the Alliance. He commands the flagship of the alien fleet that means to attack the bunker. He halts the attack right before they reach the Alliance when he sees that Walter Logan is alive. He later accompanies the team that infiltrates the Shadoen command ship. First appearance: Episode 13 - The Conduit (Part 1).

Sid (Alec Willows): A Shadoen operative posing as a conspiracy theorist. He tips off the location of the first Lycanthrope that Nick Logan encounters, intending to draw his attention to the Alliance. Later, he anonymously directs Logan to seek out the Conduit, creating a temporary rift in Nick's loyalty. In "The Conduit (Part 2)", he finally reveals himself amid the Conduit refugees' retreat from an Alliance raid; gaining Logan's trust by claiming to be a former Alliance member. Exploiting Logan's growing distrust of Rinaker, he assists him in infiltrating the Bunker. However, once they gain access to Rinaker's computer, he discloses his true objective: detonating the reactor core. Transforming into his true Shadoen form, he nearly succeeds in destroying the Bunker before Logan outmaneuvers him, sending him plummeting into the reactor core. As he falls, he ominously warns Logan about Omega Level. First appearance: Episode 1 - The Bait (Part 1).

Kahn Mort (Scott McNeil): A Minotauri warrior who fights with a battle axe capable of shooting lasers or being used as a hoverboard. He is noticeably sadistic and amoral as a bounty hunter. First appearing when Queen Mab send the Minotauri to kill Sh'lainn, he is teleported back into captivity once he fails to capture her. He reappears during the Banshees' war against the Vampires while in a fragile alliance with the Alliance but seeks out Sh'lainn again once he is set free from his conditional release. After trying to kill Sh'lainn again for the bounty by Queen Mab, he is teleported into space by Sh'rain and freezes beyond Earth's orbit. First appearance: Episode 9 - Bounty Wars.

Charon (Dale Wilson): A Minotauri warrior who fights with a sword and shield. His sword is capable of energy blasts while his shield can be used as a hoverboard. He competes with Kahn Mort for the Sh'lainn's head in exchange for his freedom. In the middle of the hunt, he encounters and is defeated by Nick Logann, who leaves his body in the bushes for Alliance agents to find while using Charon's armor to impersonate him and take the bounty off Sh'lainn's head. First appearance: Episode 9 - Bounty Wars.

Sh'rain: Daughter of Queen Mab, she is a close friend of Sh'lainn and is sympathetic to her even after her defection to the Alliance. Upon hearing how Sh'lainn begins suffering from the Iron Death, she give Nick Logan an Ur stone to cure her.

Valra (Venus Terzo): A vampire scientist employed by Hanek before ultimately going rogue. She almost successfully takes over Intracom when she alters her genetic structure after biting Sh'lainn. As a Banshee hybrid, she was able to emit energy projectiles and was no longer affected by the Sun. She was imprisoned by the Alliance after her failed coup, and her powers wear off. Valra is among the aliens that are set free by Trueblood shortly before the bunker explodes. First appearance: Episode 15 - Queen Banshee (Part 1).

Setakha: An ancient winged Vampire from Egypt who is the son of Set. In ancient times, he and his father controlled the Upper Kingdom while using the Pharaohs as puppets. Consequentially, he was regarded as a malevolent deity and known as the Master of Pharaohs. He was later sealed in stasis for four thousand years before being reawakened by the other Vampires with a special Ankh shaped key and Nema's blood. He then reactivates his robotic guardian, the Sphinx, to wreak havoc in Egypt with the intent of activating an ancient but inactive enslavement beacon to control mankind before he is disintegrated in his beacon's activation beam.

Chupacabra: A vampire agent named Dvorak that bites Rinaker (posing as Walter Logan in 1979 in an attempt to frame The Alliance for bombing a Conduit safe house). He is physically mutated into the Chupacabra and his cognitive reasoning is somewhat diminished. He preys on live stock and uses his venom to make dometistic animals attack Intracom workers that are leveling the Amazon rainforest. He is found by Nick Logan and tries to reveal information on the Shadoen but is killed by Rinaker (using an Intracom helicopter to frame the Vampires) before he can do so.

Baron Samedi (Paul Dobson): The leader of the Vodun, perpetually scheming to have his minions use living humans as hosts in order to launch a Vodun invasion. When he is captured and cryogenically frozen within the bunker, Agaza and Babul plot to free him by overrunning the alliance, using alliance operatives as hosts. He is ultimately killed when his own subordinate Babul reveals that high frequencies would kill the Vodun, allowing Sh'lainn to use her banshee scream. First appearance: Episode 12 - Vodun Rising.

Agaza: Samedi's right hand and possesses a humanoid panther body. She flees the bunker before Sh'lainn uses her Banshee scream. She tries to start up Vodun activity again at a chemical plant but is ultimately captured and imprisoned by the Alliance.

Babul: The Vodun that shares a body with Keung Ling. While initially capitalizing on Ling's thirst for physical power in order to infiltrate the alliance, he comes to understand the human conscience. This makes him question the Vodun agenda, and ultimately gets him labelled a traitor by Samedi for suggesting that the Vodun coexist with their hosts. Babul then reveals the Vodun's weakness to hypersonic sound and dies in penance alongside the other Vodun when Sh'lainn unleashes a banshee scream at a high frequency.

Su-Ak: Previously the leader/guardian of the Sasquatch, he was upstaged by Ti-Yet during a revolt on a Lycanthrope slave ship. He later betrayed Ti-Yet by releasing the lycanthropes in order to kill him, but ended up inadvertently killing the remaining members of the Sasquatch race. He blamed the Yeti for the tragedy, but ultimately realized that he had caused his people's deaths and committed suicide by falling off a waterfall.

Keel: The Shadoen Multitiude Fleet Commander. Upon reconvening with Wraith, Keel pointed questioned him on the purpose of keeping Walter and Nathan Logan alive for so long. Keel was led by sub-commander Wraith into underestimating the humans, which ultimately leads to his demise when the U.S. government responds to Keel's ultimatum by launching nuclear warheads at Keel's ship.

=== Other characters ===
Nathan Boyer (Dale Wilson): When the real Walter Logan disappears in 1979, Rinaker appoints Nate to pretend to be Walter Logan. He comes to love Nick as if he were his own son, and without Rinaker's knowledge, indirectly teaches Nick to combat aliens such as Werewolves and Vampires. When Nick is grown up, Nate retires as an agent but continues to pose as Walter Logan and is admitted into a retirement home due to his heart condition. When Nick's memories begin to return Nate reveals that he is actually Nick's stepfather. Shortly afterwards, Intracom kidnaps Nate. Nick spends most of the series searching for Nate, finding him and losing him multiple times. When the new Alliance is formed to defend Earth from the Shadoen invasion, Nate apologizes to Walter for playing into Rinaker's hand. He atones for his actions when he and Ruk decided to pilot a hastily crafted ship equipped with an unstable beam cannon to destroy their primary weapon along with many other Shadoen vessels. First appearance: Episode 1 - The Bait (Part 1).

Kraker: A close friend of Nick and his informant from his days as a bounty hunter. A very skilled hacker, he is very useful as a son of a gun of non-Alliance tainted information.

Walter Logan (Dale Wilson): Nick Logan's father and someone with insider knowledge of the Alliance. He was also the founder of the Conduit and wanted humankind to peacefully coexist with the other alien races. He was kidnapped by the Shadoen posing as General Rinaker, and put into cryogenic stasis in the Omega Level of the Alliance's maximum security prison at the Bikini Atoll. Later on, he was freed by his son, Nick, and was instrumental in forging a new Alliance between humans and aliens.

Wi-Yoom: A female Yeti, she is Ti-Yet's mate and leader of the Yeti once he is captured and later conscripted into the Alliance. She was first seen when she and the other Yeti are forced to evacuate their original underground village in the Himalayas with the EMP bomb once the Lycanthrope attack. After the EMP bomb is taken back by the Lycanthrope, she contacts the Alliance in order for Ti-Yet to deactivate it as it was inadvertently activated during the firefight.

Athos: Losing his mother due to Alliance anti-Lycanthrope action shortly after his birth, he is secretly raised by Nick and Sh'lainn. Due to the Lycanthropes' natural ability to simulate human appearance from visual information during childhood, Athos bears a striking resemblance to Nick, whom he imprinted on as a father-figure shortly after his birth. Having found out that Logan and Sh'lainn were keeping a Lycanthrope, the Alliance kidnaps Athos for study, thus leading to a brief conflict with Nick, resulting in Athos being returned to his real father, Ruck. Athos is one of the few Lycanthropes in the show that do not seek war, same as Kara, his late mother, who wished for him to join the Conduit. After his father's heroic sacrifice, it is presumed that Athos assumed new leadership of the werewolf pack. First appearance: Episode 18 - The Cub.

Jerich: The equivalent of Superman, he is one of the last surviving members of the Argonians, an alien race that was conquered by the Shadoen. Like Vampires, he possesses a technological based shapeshifting ability in order to appear human. His true form is a yellow and bulbous humanoid with red antennae and his weakness is a golden element known as Argonium. He was sent to Earth to warn its inhabitants of the invading Shadoen and later gives his life to protect the Earth when the Shadoen attack the team assigned to retrieve the EMP bomb.

The Tribune: An alien that visited Earth during the times of ancient Greece, and was known to humans as Prometheus the fire-giver. He returns to Earth to reveal the Roswell Conspiracy by giving news reporter Carl McGavin a data disk that would enlighten the human race. His plans are interceded by the Alliance, though Nick questions Rinaker's actions against the Tribune. Rinaker incarcerates the Tribune because of his knowledge on Rinaker's true identity. The Tribune is among the aliens that are set free by Trueblood shortly before the bunker explodes. He provides the New Alliance with detailed information on the power of the Shadoen's linked formation.

Spot: A Sun Spot alien that was spirited away from the Sun by vampires centuries earlier. He eventually escaped and burrowed to the Earth's core for sustainence and doesn't return to the surface until the recent development of nuclear plants. Spot is the cause of the Chernobyl and Three Mile Island accidents. Sh'lain understands his docile nature and protects him. Rinaker allows Spot to stay at the bunker and feed off the fusion reactor. He sacrifices himself to temporarily stabilize the reactor when Rinaker sets the bunker to self-destruct, and almost takes Rinaker with him by refocusing the explosion at Rinaker's fleeing ship.

Kao Lin: An elderly tan skinned and grey haired alien with an Asiatic motif, he was the previous leader of the Conduit. He fought with a staff and was aware that someone was posing as Walter Logan while attacking the Conduit in the past. He loses his life holding off Alliance operatives for Nick and the Conduit to escape when he is shot in the back in the middle of a duel with Trueblood. Another one of his kind was seen in Numbered Days Part 1.

== Alien races ==
Aesiri (AKA Viking gods): The Aesiri come from a gravity-heavy planet via a comet centuries ago. Due to the condition of their homeworld, their bodies can withstand much more punishment than any other species. One of the Aesiri, Odin, is shown using laser vision. The Aesiri are notoriously sadistic and psychopathic, enjoying causing both physical and psychological torture. While the Aesiri cannot shapeshift, they can project mental holograms into the minds of others, and seemingly take others' forms. Two Aesiri, Odin and Loki, were being held in the Alliance maximum security containment facility in the Bikini Atoll. They escaped and planned to use a Frost Giant to initiate Ragnarök only to perish when the Frost Giant they physically bonded to fell into a ravine of lava.

Argonian: A race of yellow and bulbous humanoids with red antennae that inhabited a planet known as Argonius, a planet that was conquered by the Shadoen. They possessed the ability of flight, enhanced strength, as well as heat vision but were susceptible to a yellow element known as Argonium. Little is known about their technological state, but they were known to use technology that was advanced enough to make them shapeshift like the Vampires.

Banshee: A race of female humanoid teleporters who live in harmony with the Earth, but are poisoned by humanity's growing dependence on electronics. Banshee can predict when someone will die, and can fire energy bursts or fly. They are most well known for their ability to produce piercing shrieks. They also have lifespans ranging for hundreds or thousands of years, and have been on Earth since they landed in Ireland around 527 BC. This race is in constant warfare with the Vampire Empire, which is fundamentally their ideological opposite - draining life and using technology. One interesting trait is that a banshee can initiate a deep mind probe into another person to retrieve lost memories. However, such a process will form a permanent bond between their life forces. This can be considered as the banshee version of marriage. Sh'lainn and Nick form this bond in order for him to regain his lost memories. As evidenced in Episode 11 - Countdown, a Banshee who spends too much time around technology contracts a sickness known as the "Iron Death", which causes her to go wild as she transforms technology into organic material and directs it against others. Though initially deemed incurable by Mab, her daughter, Sh'rain, later reveals that an Ur stone can counter this sickness. A Banshee is also weakened when in space, due to her power being drawn from the Earth. The race is tied to the Tree of Light in their hidden lair, and its destruction would also bring about the deaths of every Banshee.

Cerberus: A three headed parahound android that can track a target anywhere in the world. The Minotauri use Cereberus to hunt their prey. One was used to track down Sh'lainn but was then trapped by Logan and disassembled.

Conduit: The Conduit is a confederation of members from many different alien races. Its main purpose is to safely move aliens throughout the planet and relocate survivors of the inter-species wars. Colonel Walter Logan was an influential force in negotiations with the Conduit, until he apparently set off a bomb at a Conduit safehouse, killing dozens of aliens. The Conduit is considered an enemy of the Global Alliance. It is eventually revealed that the bombing of the safehouse was caused by a Shadoen agent posing as Walter, as an attempt to destabilize relations between the Alliance and the aliens.

Cyclops: Enormous black mechanical giants with a single red eye, they were constructed by the Titani, and sent to Earth to protect the planet from the Shadoens. They possess the ability to mind control and to fire lasers from their eyes. In addition to being the basis for the Cyclops myths, another member was known as the basis for the myth of the giant automaton known as Talos. The Cyclops successfully defended the planet in the 15th century BC, using a long range beam cannon to destroy a Shadoen fleet, but the blast also wiped out the Aegean civilization (Atlantis: the most prosperous human culture at the time) by causing an unintended tsunami. Two cyclops were later reactivated and tried to fire a massive beam cannon, located on the island of Santorini, at a second Shadoen invasion, but both of them were destroyed along with the cannon by the Alliance, under the manipulation of Rinaker.

Faun: A race of green or white-furred anthropomorphic goats. Unlike their legendary counterparts, female pans exist and the race is not as hedonistic as in Greek myths, such as engaging in marriage and raising families.

Frost Giant: An alien snake that came from the Aesiri's homeworld, the Frost Giants can fire a beam that absorbs all energy (including life) while freezing the said target on impact. While dangerous, they possess no sapience and require an Aesiri linked to its nervous system to direct them. The Banshee imprisoned one in stasis centuries ago in Iceland. But it was later released by the Aesiri and forced the Alliance to kill it by making it fall into a ravine of lava.

Fusion Breed: Not an alien race per se, but a hybrid created by crossing Shadoen DNA with earth fire ants. By using ants as the subject of the experiment, a large number of hybrids could be born by means of a single ant queen, though most of them were wiped out by Logan thanks to being given some suspiciously, timely ammunition by Rinaker in Episode 8 - Fusion Breed. However, they were not completely obliterated and a few eggs were used to recreate the experiment. The hatchlings were then frozen in stasis in the Omega Level alongside Walter Logan and were released in an attempt by Rinaker to prevent the Logans from escaping. However, they were drowned by sea water when Nick flooded the prison.

Golem: Creatures of living stone. The Conduit alien resistance is currently led by a Golem named Chauf.

I.E.D Unit: A humanoid robotic assassin constructed by the Shadoen. It is designed to infiltrate any known fortress, execute a designated biological target and its offspring, and detonate to ensure all traces of it and its victims are wiped out, hence the acronym. In addition to possessing active camouflage, the ability to fire lasers, regeneration, limb morphing, and tracking down targets with a long range biological scanner, it is practically indestructible. After Walter Logan was kidnapped 22 years ago, an IED unit was discovered and apparently targeting Nick Logan (though its actual target was Rinaker - whether it was intended to kill Wraith or the original Rinaker is unknown). It was disable by straining its power core from continuous week-long combat with an extremely high casualty rate as a result. Years later, it was unintentionally activated by Sh'lainn and Nick before wreaking havoc in the bunker and ultimately being forced to self-destruct by Sh'lainn overloading its reactor.

Kachina: A mysterious and musical race, the Kachina, along with another benevolent being called the Spider Woman, reside in a parallel universe slightly out of sync with our own. Physically, they resemble four armed and cloaked humanoids with heads that can be described as a mix between a moth and a bird. They form a central part in the lives of Trueblood's tribe, a fictional Pueblo tribe known as the Chirauc, and send rain whenever the chief requests for it in the vision cave. The Lycanthrope attempted to capture one for a mysterious benefactor, and then eradicate the rest in Episode 33 - Rain.

Lycanthrope (AKA Werewolves): Sapient, humanoid wolves that have the biological ability to change their appearance into human form. The Lycanthrope used one of two EMP charges to reverse the magnetic polarity of the Yeti homeworld and destroy it. They were the slave masters of both the Sasquatch and the Yeti before they rebelled. Lycanthrope have an eight to ten year life span, and because of this they grow at an incredibly accelerated rate compared to humans. They are very close to their father or paternal figure when they are growing. Shortly after birth, Lychanthropes imprint on a human to solely gain the ability to shapeshift to look like that particular human; older Lycanthrope, such as Ruck, have been shown to transform into an elderly version of their human form to use in ambushes.

Minotauri: Armored warriors with the body of a man and the head of a bull. Apparently, one of these is the Minotaur of Greek legend. The Minotauri lost a war with the Banshee, and as a result, all of the surviving Minotauri were frozen in stasis.

Oni: The Oni resemble the demons of Japanese mythology and are characterized with horns, sharp teeth, various skin colors, and four arms. Oni have biological shapeshifting abilities, and the majority of the Oni race play a large part in Japanese organized crime. Most yakuza operations are directed by the Oni.

Sasquatch: A long-lived race similar to the Yeti and resided on their same home world, although they dislike the cold climates the Yeti find comfortable. The Sasquatch were slaves along with the Yeti, but were regarded as inferior by them. Physically they are brown and are slightly smaller compared to their cousins and the males lack the horns found in their Yeti counterparts. During an escape attempt from the Lyncathrope slave ships, almost all of the Sasquatch were massacred indirectly due to Su-ak's betrayal of Ti-yet 250 years ago. They are believed to be extinct after Su-Ak commits suicide.

Shadoen: The Shadoen Multitude is a highly advanced hostile species that devote themselves to the enslavement or destruction of other races. They are an insectile/crustanean race divided into various castes and are led by an Elder Council on their homeworld. They are also known to be treacherous to both others and members of their own species; as seen with Wraith's betrayal of Commander Keel, or when the Shadoen spy "Sid" attempted to hasten the collapse of the Alliance by first attempting to kill Wraith (still disguised as Rinaker). They are also only willing to colonize planets that meet specific criteria, such as Earth, and are known to have an aversion to oxygen (a reason why they are responsible for instigating the deforestation of the Amazon), as stated in Episode 10 - Chupacabra. A common tactic that they use to subjugate a newly discovered planet is to use a combined fleet to fragment its moon with a laser while letting the fallout devastate the local species. Contrary to races such as the Lycanthropes - who have an innate mimetic system - or the Vampires - who use holographic technology - the Shadoen are not shapeshifters. In order to acquire the target race appearance, the Shadoen imprint their DNA and memories on a human clone, in so becoming an exact replica of the victim (which is also why Logan's eyes cannot detect them). After the assimilation, the Shadoen can not freely morph to its former original shape, having to maintain the target guise or forfeit it by triggering a Shadoen DNA bomb. Once activated, the DNA bomb restores the agent to its full-fledged Shadoen form, permanently destroying the previous target guise in the process. This ability has permitted the Shadoen to successfully infiltrate the human race. The Shadoen are by far more powerful and resilient than the other alien races seen on the show: they also possess a mild ability of regeneration, and their blood has a poisonous effect if ingested, as witnessed in Episode 10 - Chupacabra. They attempted to conquer Earth during the 15th century BC, but their fleet was repulsed by a long range beam cannon sent to Earth by the Titani. Their second invasion is thwarted by the efforts of the new alien-human Alliance with the use of the Lycanthrope EMP bomb. First appearance: Episode 14 - The Conduit (Part 2).

Siren: Blue or green skinned and green haired female humanoids with red eyes. Their song is hypnotic and they emit bright multi colored lights for while singing. One is seen as a member of the Conduit.

Sun Spot: Giant green and radioactive creatures with spots in their back. They resemble slugs with the head and forelimbs of salamanders and dwell on the surface of the Sun. They feast off of radiation and heat. Some time in the past, the Vampires captured one named Spot and sought to use it as a power source only for it to break free and escape.

Titani: A peaceful race, which constructed the Cyclops and sent them to protect Earth from the Shadoen Multitude. First mentioned on Episode 28 - When Giants Walked the Earth.

Tribune: An alien race that visited Earth during the times of ancient Greece. One was known to humanity as Prometheus, the giver of fire. They are a small green-skinned humanoids with tentacle-like forearms that are known for their intellect, intelligence gathering, and their use of crystal based technology (including cloaked reconnaissance satellites armed with lasers and human size exo-suits armed with ray pistols). They also had previous experience with the Shadoen and sent one of their number to Earth to assist in repelling the invasion.

Vampire: The Dark Empire of the vampires is broken into families, each acting with a certain level of autonomy. True to legend, vampires can be killed by direct exposure to sunlight. However, wooden stakes do no more harm to a vampire than to anyone else. First appearing in South America (where they established a colony), the Vampires are mainly a technological and business orientated race, which doesn't have any regard for nature, often clashing with the Banshees. The Vampires are also amoral about life and are known to use the Banshees as "batteries" for their teleporters. Several major vampire families, headed by Hanek, created the multi-national corporation Intracom, which they use to fund their wars against the Banshee and the Alliance. Vampires possess basic shapeshifting technology permitting them to change their appearance into human form. A vampire's real form is a large, yellow snake with arms, and a round, human-like, hooded head. Vampires possess a venom that allow them to enslave other races for short periods. There are also known to be a rare breed of winged vampires who were associated with Ancient Egypt during the Old Kingdom.

Vodun: Slug-like parasites that can only live within the bodies of the dead. Vodun hosts are able to see in the dark and regenerate flesh. Vodun have been on this planet for approximately three hundred years. When the Vodun try to possess a living person, the two minds merge and drive each other insane, rendering the host and Vodun useless. Alliance Detection teams report that the Vodun may be trying to create the technology needed for their race to inhabit living beings. They were later able to perfect their assimilation process and were nearly successful in taking over the Alliance from within. Fortunately, they were killed by a hyper sonic scream by Sh'lainn while the survivors were rounded up in raids.

Yeti: Often referred to as an “abominable snowman”, the Yeti are a humanoid race that live high in the mountains of the Himalayas. They are physically larger than humans and possess three digits on each hand and two on each foot. In addition, males are known to possess horns while they and their relatives, the Sasquatch can live for centuries. The Lyncathrope destroyed the magnetic polarity of their home planet with an EMP bomb - rendering it lifeless, and took them as slaves. When the Lycanthrope neared Earth 250 years ago to enslave the native humans, the Yeti overpowered their captors alongside the Sasquatch and escaped with the Lycanthrope's second EMP bomb. Agent Ti-yet is a member of the Yeti race, and his status in the Alliance is necessary due only to the knowledge he has of the Lycanthrope EMP bomb.

== Episodes ==
No.	Title	Directed by	Written by	Original release date	Prod. code
1 2	"The Bait"	Bradley Charles Rader	Bob Forward and Rick Ungar	August 27, 1999	101
1 2	"The Bait"	Bradley Charles Rader	Bob Forward and Rick Ungar	August 27, 1999	102
Bounty Hunter Nick Logan finds himself in the middle of a conspiracy involving his father, alien creatures, and a mysterious woman named Sh'lainn Blaze.
3	"Mountain Retreat"	Tom Tataranowicz	Greg Johnson	August 27, 1999	103
The Alliance teams up with the Lycanthrope leader, Ruck, to track down a creature in the Himalayas.
4	"Troubled Past"	Tom Tataranowicz	Greg Johnson and Richard Mueller	September 15, 1999	104
Nick starts searching for the truth about his father when his step-father goes missing with Nick inadvertently unearthing a synthetic assassin.
5	"Peacemaker"	Bradley Charles Rader	Martha Moran	September 24, 1999	105
Nick and Sh'lainn attempt to convince a potentially good Lycanthrope to join the Alliance.
6	"Snowman’s Chance"	Bradley Charles Rader	Bob Forward	October 8, 1999	106
Ti-Yet is the only one who can save the Lycanthrope, but after years of Yeti enslavement, can Nick and Sh'lainn convince him to do it?.
7	"The Roswell Incident"	Tom Tataranowicz	Doug Molitor	October 15, 1999	107
Rinaker recalls the origins of the government's involvement in alien conspiracies and the beginning of the Alliance.
8	"Fusion Breed"	Tom Tataranowicz	Ken Pontac	October 22, 1999	108
Innocent civilians are being attacked by unknown creatures. Nick is partnered with Dr. Marina Petrovic to investigate.
9	"Bounty Wars"	Charles E. Bastien	Simon Furman	October 29, 1999	109
Sh'lainn goes AWOL after having a terrible nightmare about Nick's demise.
10	"Chupacabra"	Charles E. Bastien	Michael A. Medlock	November 5, 1999	110
Rinaker assigns Nick and Sh'lainn to investigate sightings of El Chupacabra in the Amazon Rainforest.
11	"Countdown"	Bradley Charles Rader	Don Gillies	November 12, 1999	111
Sh'lainn starts getting sick when she's separated from nature for too long and has a devastating nightmare about the deaths of everyone in the Alliance.
12	"Vodun Rising"	Bradley Charles Rader	Greg Johnson	November 19, 1999	112
Trueblood, Sh'lainn, and Nema search for Nick and Fitz after their ship is taken down by a hurricane in Haiti.
13 14	"The Conduit"	Charles E. Bastien	Simon Furman	November 26, 1999	113
13 14	"The Conduit"	Charles E. Bastien	Simon Furman	December 4, 1999	114
While searching for the truth about his father, Nick finds a group of refugee aliens and starts to question his role in the Alliance.
15 16	"Queen of The Banshees"	Tom Tataranowicz	Meg McLaughlin	December 11, 1999	115
15 16	"Queen of The Banshees"	Tom Tataranowicz	Meg McLaughlin	December 18, 1999	116
After Queen Mab disappears, Sh'lainn is forced to take the throne and lead her clan in avenging Queen Mab.
17	"The Partnership"	Dan Fausett	Ian Weir	December 25, 1999	117
Nick partners up with Fitz for an undercover mission in Fitz's hometown where two groups of vampires are holding a conference.
18	"The Cub"	Dan Fausett	Mark Hoffmeier	January 1, 2000	118
Nick and Sh'lainn temporarily adopt a werewolf cub after his mother dies in childbirth.
19	"Amok Vampire"	Tom Tataranowicz	Dennis Haley and Marcy Brown	February 5, 2000	123
During a fight, Valra accidentally takes a bite out of Sh'lainn's hand, and gets an interest in the potentials of Banshee life force.
20	"Spot"	Dan Fausett and Gregg Davidson	Warren Greenwood	March 4, 2000	127
After Fitz tracks down Walter Logan, Nick and Sh'lainn go on a mission to rescue him.
21	"When Giants Walked the Earth"	Bradley Charles Rader	Joe Pearson and Jeff Conner	March 11, 2000	128
A group of archaeologists reawaken a giant creature that may not have the Earth's best interests at heart.
22	"Flying Saucer Down"	Bradley Charles Rader and Chuck Patton	Peter David and Bill Mumy	March 13, 2000	119
A UFO crashes at a Journalist Award Show, Nick, Sh'lainn, Fitz and Nema work to cover up the truth from public eye.
23	"Father of Terror"	Dan Fausett and Gregg Davidson	Douglas Booth	March 18, 2000	129
Nick, Sh'lainn, Nema, and Fitz investigate some vampire attacks in Cairo, Egypt. While there, Nema plans on introducing Fitz to her parents.
24	"The Last Sasquatch"	Bradley Charles Rader	Doug Molitor	March 20, 2000	120
Ti-Yet relives his time as a slave when he reunites with an old acquaintance, Su-Ak.
25	"Beast Within"	Bradley Charles Rader	Katherine Lawrence	March 25, 2000	130
Agent Ling, jealous of Nick's ability to see monsters in their true form, finds himself in the hands of the Vodun.
26	"Crackerjack"	George Elliot	Simon Furman	March 27, 2000	121
Sh'lainn goes searching for Nick after he's kidnapped by a group of Lycanthrope.
27	"Target: Hero"	Tom Tataranowicz	James W. Bates	April 1, 2000	131
A powerful alien named Jerich comes to Earth to warn the entire world about an oncoming alien invasion.
28	"Whatever Fitz"	George Elliot	Bob Forward	April 3, 2000	122
After Nick breaks his leg during an incident involving an ex-yakuza, Fitz takes his place and partners up with Sh'lainn to fight against a group of Oni.
29	"Area 51"	Tom Tataranowicz	Jules Dennis	April 5, 2000	124
Nick, Sh'lainn, Fitz, and Nema go on an undercover mission into Area 51 after Ti-Yet crash lands a flying saucer.
30	"Vodun Among Us"	Tom Tataranowicz	Mark Hoffmeier	April 8, 2000	132
The Vodun use Ling and Babul's symbiosis to break into the Bunker.
31	"Rain"	George Elliot	Bob Forward	April 15, 2000	133
Trueblood is called back to his home by interdimensional beings called the Kachina.
32 34	"Showdown"	George Elliot	Simon Furman	April 17, 2000	125
32 34	"Showdown"	George Elliot	Simon Furman	April 24, 2000	126
Walter Logan is kidnapped by Hanek and Nick goes solo in an attempt to save him while Sh'lainn revisits her clan for help.
33	"Devil Inside"	Bradley Charles Rader	Ian Weir	April 22, 2000	134
Two alien creatures escape from the Alliance's maximum security prison.
35	"Back Spin"	Bradley Charles Rader	The Trio	April 29, 2000	135
The Alliance Bunker is in serious danger of being discovered by the public.
36	"Third Degree"	Chuck Patton	Greg Johnson	May 6, 2000	136
Rinaker goes over previously solved cases from the past year in order to uncover the mole at the Alliance.
37	"Conspiracy Revealed"	George Elliot	Randy Littlejohn and Christy Marx	May 13, 2000	137
Sh'lainn bonds her mind with Nick's to look into his father's disappearance and they finally learn the truth.
38	"Confrontation"	Chuck Patton	Pamela Hickey and Dennys McCoy	May 20, 2000	138
Nick teams up with his father and colonel Rowe, to take down general Rinaker while the aliens form an alliance of their own.
39 40	"Numbered Days"	Tom Tataranowicz	Simon Furman	May 27, 2000	139
39 40	"Numbered Days"	Tom Tataranowicz	Simon Furman	June 3, 2000	140
The heroes team up with all the alien species on Earth to battle the invading Shadoen army.

== Credits ==
Co-created by Kaaren Lee Brown, the show's pilot episode and bible were written by Bob Forward and Greg Johnston, Story Editors. Some sources say it was set up to be shown as either 20 one-hour-long episodes or for each episode to be split in half to equal 40 thirty-minute episodes. Aside from a few dual part episodes, however, the storytelling reads better as 40 separate episodes. There was a production budget from Bohbot of U.S.; $500,000 per episode with a blend of cel animation and special effects at Epoch Ink in Santa Monica, California, with the talents of Joe Pearson, Tom Tataranowicz, Chuck Patton, Brad Coombs, Young Yoon, Harry Warner, Rick Ungar, Brad Rader and Gregg Davidson. Stephanie Graziano produced. Pearson was later credited with showrunning the series, where he met Kevin Eastman, the co-creator of the Teenage Mutant Ninja Turtles.

== Production ==
On May 13, 1998, it was announced Bohbot Entertainment would be producing Roswell Conspiracies — Aliens, Myths & Legends for a fall 1999 broadcast on the syndicated Bohbot Kids Network. The episodes were budgeted at $850,000 each for 44 half hour long episodes. However, in June 1999 it was reported the run would actually consist of 40 episodes budgeted at a total of $18.7 million or $467,500 per episode. Gargoyles creator Greg Weisman was initially announced as a writer and producer for the series, though Weisman ended up having no affiliation with the final series. Weisman wrote the original pilot under the title The Roswell Conspiracies, however the pilot script was rejected though some of Weisman's concepts were incorporated into the final version of the series. The series marked Bohbot Entertainment's first time producing an animated series rather than serving as just a distributor. The series was the first project for Bohbot Kids Network, a syndication package similar to Bohbot's Amazin' Adventures that aimed to have the look and feel of a network block similar to Fox Kids. Stephanie Graziano was chosen to head up BKN given her role in helping establish Fox Kids.

== Broadcast ==
The series began broadcasting in first-run syndication on August 28, 1999 and continued to broadcast until June 3, 2000. A dual distribution deal between Bohbot Entertainment and Sci-Fi Channel saw the series broadcast on the Sci-Fi Channel from August 27, 1999 through November 26, 1999. On April 4, 2001, it was confirmed that the series was picked up by Fox to air on Fox Kids block from April 7 through May 27 of that year, which the series reran on as part of the network's Saturday-morning and Weekday schedules. The series reportedly struggled to attain a foothold in the United States.

Bohbot Entertainment sold international broadcasting rights to the series to various regional distributors including BBC in the United Kingdom, Super RTL in Germany, Mediaset in Italy, Antenna TV in Greece, M-Net in South Africa, Televisa in Mexico, and Cartoon Network in Latin America.

The show achieved some success in the international market such as when the show was in Top 5 children's shows in the UK on BBC in April 2001. Germany's Super RTL credited the series along with Max Steel with attracting older kid viewers to their after school block.

== Home media releases ==
=== United States ===
In 2007, budget distributor Digiview Entertainment released five DVD volumes containing four episodes each, titled "Bounty Wars", "The Bait", "Conduit", "Countdown", and "Area 51". Plans for a DVD box set, slated for release on July 30, 2007, came and went, with its availability unknown due to problems with retailer support; however, Target carried a $5 box set with episodes 1–20 in early 2010. The series is available to stream on various platforms, such as Tubi (with an alternate listing of episodes 19-40), Pluto TV, and Prime Video.

Discotek Media released the entire series on Blu-ray on October 27, 2026.

=== Germany ===
The German company Pidax released all 40 episodes on 3 volumes (2 DVDs each) in 2018.

=== United Kingdom ===
As of March 9, 2020, the first 20 episodes were made available on Amazon Prime Video UK.

== Merchandise ==
A toy line of action figures based on the series was produced by Giochi Preziosi.

== Video games ==
In June 1999, it was reported that Bohbot Entertainment had entered into a deal with Red Storm Entertainment to produce video games for both consoles and PCs bases on the series. In April 2000, it was reported that three developers would be developing different versions of the game: the PlayStation version would be made by Red Lemon Studios, the Game Boy Color version would be developed by Crawfish Interactive, and the Nintendo 64 and Dreamcast versions would be made by Climax Studios. In detailing the Dreamcast version, the game was intended to contain over 26 huge levels in 6 different locations and would feature a story that voice actors from the show. Unlike other versions, the Dreamcast version of the game was slated to use a cel shaded art style similar to other games on the system like Jet Set Radio. The Dreamcast version had been slated for a November 2000 release. At the 2000 E3, Red Storm was able to demo the Dreamcast version of the game, but the Nintendo 64 version was absent as the team were dealing with a multitude of issues with the developers citing challenges with making individual elements (Collision detection, artificial intelligence, etc.) come together into a cohesive whole. During development, the Nintendo 64 version was struck by repeated delays and Red Storm was reportedly having second thoughts about the market viability of the game in the wake of their acquisition by Ubisoft due to the show it was based on not having much staying power or impact within the United States and the Nintendo 64 being at the end of its lifespan meaning cartridge sales would not justify further production. In March 2001, it was reported the Dreamcast version had been cancelled with the PlayStation and Game Boy Color versions still slated for release.

The PlayStation and Game Boy Color versions of the game were released on July 13, 2001 by Ubi Soft, just one year after the series had finished its run on June 2, 2000. The Game Boy Color version alternates between top down shooting and driving missions, and players must determine which non-player characters are secretly aliens. The game features twenty levels spread across five locations.

== Reboot ==
Promotional image for the reboot of Roswell Conspircies featuring the characters of Valerie Torsdotter (Top Left) and Michael “Eek” Ekong (Center right) fighting against alien creatures.

In November 2019, it was reported that 41 Entertainment had begun development on a computer animated consisting of eight 44-minute episodes for an estimated release in Fall 2021. Per a statement by 41 Entertainment's Kiersten Halstead, development was spurred by the resurgence of interest in UFO conspiracy theories, in particular citing the Facebook event and viral phenomenon Storm Area 51 which the reboot planned to include as a plot point. The series was planned to take place 20 years after the end of the original with the Alliance having safely contained the last of the hostile alien forces leaving only the most peaceful alien species to assimilate with Human society. With no further active threats, the Alliance now consists of an older staff whose duties include maintaining the ruse of Area 51 and watching over the alien prisoners. When the viral Storm Area 51 leads to thousands of conspiracy theorists overwhelming what remains of the Alliance guards, the chaos frees several dangerous extraterrestrial creatures including Nosferatu whose species is the source of Earth's 'Vampire legends. With these dangerous aliens now unleashed upon the world, the Alliance is rebuilt to deal with the fallout with a new generation of agents with Nigerian-born Michael “Eek” Ekong and his rookie partner from Norway, Valerie Torsdotter, leading the charge. To date, the series has not seen release or further updates on its development.
