= 1977 Serra-di-Pigno attack =

1977 attack in Corsica, France

- Part of the Corsican conflict
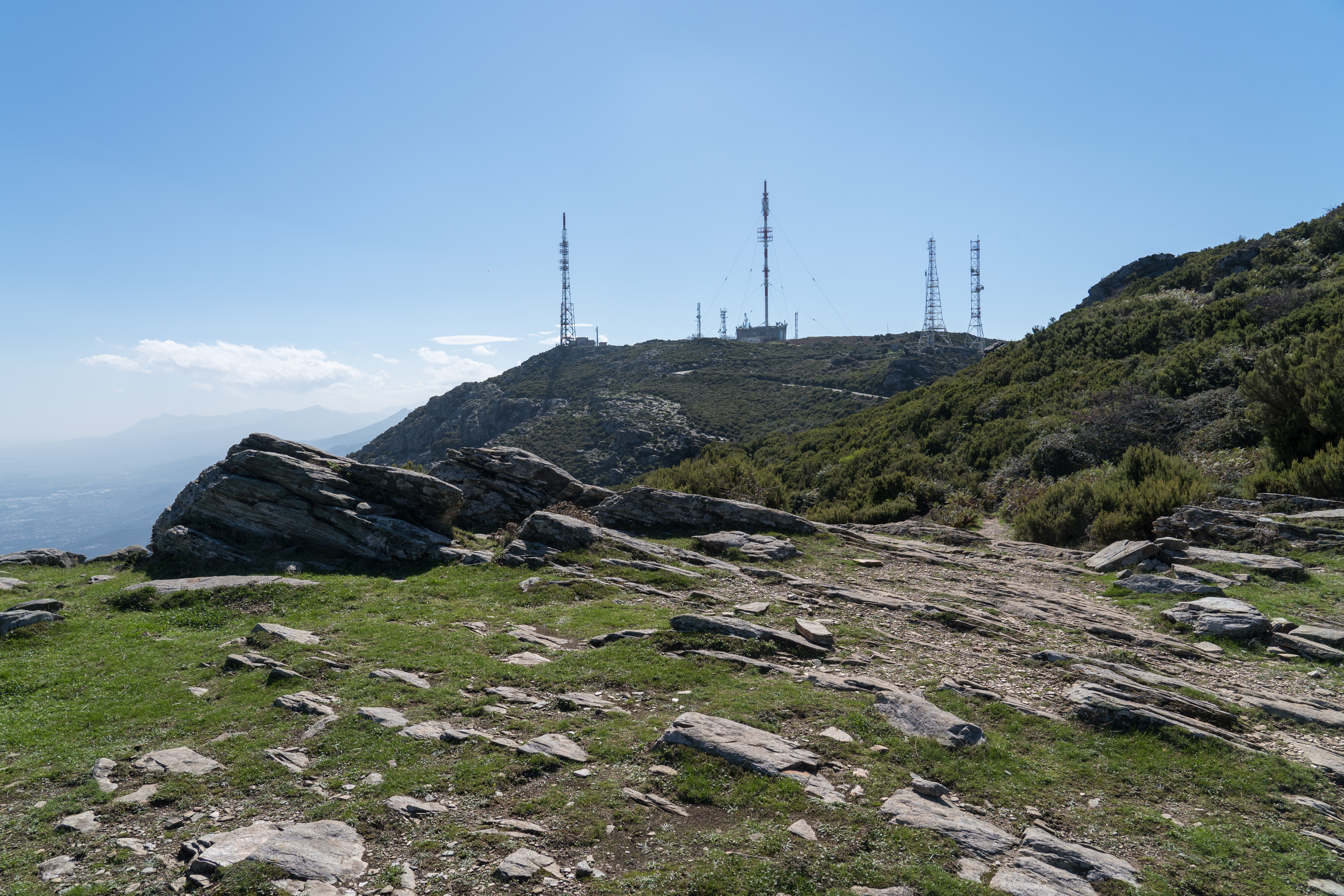
- Serra-di-Pigno relay station in 2024.
- Location: Serra-di-Pigno, Bastia, Haute-Corse, France
- Date: 13 August 1977; 12:30 a.m.
- Target: Serra-di-Pigno relay station
- Attack type: Raid, bombing
- Deaths: 0
- Injuries: 0
- Perpetrator: National Liberation Front of Corsica
- Motive: To combat French state media and promote Corsican language broadcasting

On 13 August 1977, a commando of five men from the National Liberation Front of Corsica (FLNC) infiltrated the television relay station atop the Serra-di-Pigno, a mountain near Bastia above the Bocca di Teghjime, and bombed the radio towers. The attack brought down television in parts of Haute-Corse for 18 months, and was heralded at the time as one of the most "spectacular" attacks in the FLNC's ongoing guerrilla war.

== Background ==
The National Liberation Front of Corsica (FLNC) was founded fifteen months before the attack, on 5 May 1976. Since its inception, the group has promoted Corsican linguistic identity. Defense of the Corsican language is integral to the FLNC's platform and was included in their founding manifesto issued on the eve of their creation. In the lead-up to the attack, the FLNC had begun issuing demands for more Corsican-language media on television and in the radio. The FLNC also pushed for a regional news station separate from France 3 Provence-Alpes.

Earlier in 1977, the FLNC conducted a raid on the French Army relay in Fort Lacroix, temporarily damaging it. This, coupled with threats from the FLNC amidst a heavy bombing campaign, caused heightened security around relay stations in Corsica.

== Attack ==
Shortly after midnight on 13 August, an FLNC commando of five men broke into the relay station atop the Serra-di-Pigno. According to testimony from one of the commandos, the men underestimated the size of the relay towers, but had brought enough bombs by pure coincidence. Upon entering the room, the men were greeted by a guard holding a shotgun, pointing it at Pantaléon Alessandri, the head of the commando. Upon being informed the commando came from the FLNC, the guard lowered his shotgun and saluted the men. The other recently appointed relay guards were held at gunpoint and ordered to leave, and the commando men began placing explosive charges around the technical room. The two discovered from an employee that the caretaker was living in the station complex with his wife, his children, and a dog. The commando rushed downstairs alongside the employee, woke the caretaker and his family up, and evacuated them. Alessandri took car keys from the caretaker and the five FLNC men, the caretaker, his wife, his child, and his dog all "piled" into his car. The explosion from the bombs caused the collapse of the relay control room, but another bomb placed under one of the relay towers failed to go off.

The FLNC commando drove the caretaker's family to the maquis in the area and deserted them. There, they encountered a car occupied by supporters of the FLNC. The supporters drove the men back to Bastia, where the caretaker's car keys were placed under a flower pot near the courthouse. The FLNC men then called the police, and informed them of the bombing and the location of the caretaker and his car keys. They then intercepted police communications through a listening device, where they found the police reluctant to drive to Pigno to assess the damages. Upon hearing one of the officers struggling to locate the car keys under the flower pot during their interception, the FLNC men called the police back and gave further directions.

== Aftermath ==
The attack prevented the airing of the founding congress of the Union of the Corsican People, an autonomist party led by Edmond Simeoni. Haute-Corse was left without television for a long period of time, and some areas had no broadcasting for as long as eighteen months.
