= Abraham Falk Muus =

Norwegian jurist and politician

Abraham Falk Muus (25 November 1789 – 28 October 1866) was a Norwegian jurist and politician.

He was elected to the Parliament of Norway from the constituency Hedemarkens Amt. He was a district stipendiary magistrate there. He served one term, in 1830.

He was a great-grandfather of Rudolf Falck Ræder.
