= Rudolf Falck Ræder =

Norwegian politician (1881–1951)

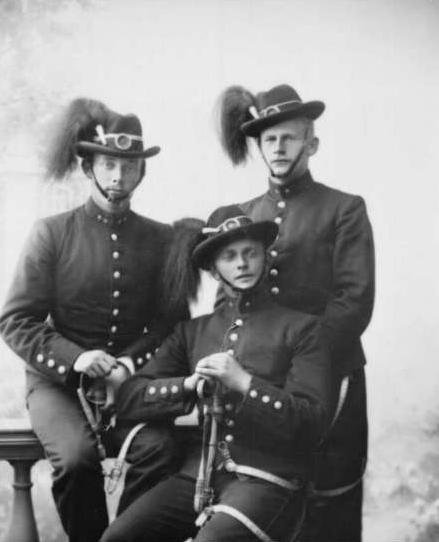
Jæger in the front, in the early 1900s.

Rudolf Falck Ræder (10 June 1881 – 5 August 1951) was a Norwegian military officer, engineer and politician for the Liberal Left Party.

He was born in Kongsvinger as a son of military captain Severin Henrik Ræder (1846–1904) og Thora Falck (1857–1947). He was a great-grandson of Abraham Falk Muus, and his paternal grandfather was a brother of Johan Christopher Ræder, Nicolai Ditlev Amund Ræder, Johan Philip Thomas Ræder and Jacob Thode Ræder. Hence he was also a great-grandson of Johan Georg Ræder.

He finished school at Aars og Voss in 1901, and was a military officer from 1902 (he reached the rank of Premier Lieutenant in 1914). He worked in engineering and construction before studying at ETH Zurich from 1906 to 1907. He was a supervisor at the building of Nedre Lerfoss from 1908 to 1909, and was then hired in the Norwegian Water Resources and Energy Directorate in 1909. From 1917 to 1931 he worked with electricity works, and from 1931 to 1938 he had his own consulting firm.

He was involved in Fedrelandslaget, and joined the Liberal Left Party. He was a board member in the Trondheim branch from 1930 to 1933, deputy central board member of the party from 1930 to 1933 and deputy chairman from 1933 to 1936. He was a member of Trondheim city council from 1931 to 1937. He was elected to the Parliament of Norway in 1930, and was re-elected in 1933. He represented the Market towns of Sør-Trøndelag and Nord-Trøndelag counties.

On 1 January 1939 he was appointed as chief administrative officer in Trondheim. During the occupation of Norway by Nazi Germany he was fired on 31 January 1941. He was expelled from Trondheim on 15 February 1941. He was arrested on 2 March 1943 and was imprisoned in Vollan, Falstad, then Grini from 8 May 1944 to 13 March 1945, then in Mysen until Germany's capitulation. He died in August 1951, and was buried in Ullern.
