= Raid of Fort Lacroix =

Raid on Fort Lacroix
- Part of Corsican conflict
Date	25 March 1977
Location	Bastia, Corsica; France 42°41′34″N 9°26′34″E
Result	FLNC victory Outpost destroyed

Belligerents
FLNC	(France) French Army

Strength
8 militants	4 soldiers

Casualties and losses
None	4 soldiers subdued
- Location within Corsica

The Raid of Fort Lacroix was an attack on a French military outpost at Fort Lacroix in Bastia, Corsica, on 25 March 1977. A commando of eight men from the National Liberation Front of Corsica broke into the French Army's relay station, capturing four sentries and bombing the military complex.

== Events ==
On the night of 25 March 1977, a group of eight FLNC members stormed the relay station at Fort Lacroix, formerly the principal French Army outpost in Haute-Corse. The main military installations were decommissioned in 1971, but half of the military section remained in the lower half of the fort, centred around the radio relay station. These were closed in 1990. The FLNC members captured the four sentries, stole weapons, damaged the relay, and destroyed the guardhouse so badly that it had to be demolished.

== Aftermath ==
A much more damaging attack occurred at the Serra-di-Pigno relay station on 13 August 1977.
