= Johan Christopher Ræder =

Norwegian military officer

Johan Christopher Ræder (21 March 1859 – 28 February 1943) was a Norwegian military officer.

He was born in Nes, Buskerud as a son of Nicolai Ditlev Ammon Ræder and Hanna Scheel. He was a brother of Anton Henrik Ræder, a grandson of Johan Christopher Ræder and a nephew of Johan Georg Ræder, Ole Munch Ræder and Jacques Ræder. He was also a grandnephew of Nicolai Ditlev Amund Ræder, Johan Philip Thomas Ræder and Jacob Thode Ræder.

He was a military officer from 1880, and after serving in the infantry he reached the rank of Premier Lieutenant in 1883, attended the Norwegian Military College and spent four years as an aide-de-camp in the General Staff from 1884 to 1888. He served in the Engineer Corps from 1889, was back in the General Staff between 1893 and 1897 and was responsible for Kongsvinger Fortress between 1901 and 1903. He also lectured at the Norwegian Military Academy from 1894 to 1903. He reached the rank of captain in 1893, major in 1903, lieutenant colonel in 1905 and major general in 1909. He was the inspector-general of the Engineer Corps from 1909 to 1916, and served as the Commanding General in Norway from 1916 to 1927.

He held the King's Medal of Merit from 1927, was a Commander, First Class of the Royal Norwegian Order of St. Olav, Grand Officier of the Legion d'honneur and held the Grand Cross of the Order of the Dannebrog and the Order of the Sword.

Military offices
Preceded by E. W. A. M. Krohn	Commanding General in Norway; 1916–1927	Succeeded by Theodor Holtfodt
