= Rhonda Glenn =

American sportscaster, author and manager of communications

- Born: May 6, 1946; Palm Beach, Florida, US
- Died: February 12, 2015 (aged 68); Gainesville, Florida, US
- Occupations: Sportscaster, golf historian

Rhonda Glenn (May 6, 1946 – February 12, 2015) was an American sportscaster, author and a manager of communications for the United States Golf Association (USGA) beginning in 1996 until her retirement in May 2013. The next year, she won the Golf Writers Association of America's William D. Richardson Award.

== Early years ==
Glenn began playing golf at age six, and won the Florida High School Athletic Association golf title twice. As an amateur golfer, she played in five U.S. Women's Amateur Championships and two U.S. Women's Open. Glenn won the Florida East Coast Golf Tournament in 1965.

== Career ==
Early in her broadcast career, Glenn was a talk show host and presented the weather and news at WAVY-TV in Portsmouth/Norfolk/Newport News in the 1970s. She was so popular at WAVY that the city of Portsmouth renamed the street where the station was located in her honor.

She was the first full-time national TV network female sportscaster when she began broadcasting at ESPN on February 6, 1981. Glenn was a golf commentator for ABC from 1978 to 1994. She was also a correspondent for Golf World Magazine and a regular contributor to Golf Journal.

She is the author or co-author of several books on golf, including The Illustrated History of Women's Golf (1992 winner of the USGA International Book Award), Golf for Women, The Beginner's Guide to Great Golf for Women, The Rules of Golf Simplified, The Junior Golf Book and Breaking the Mold: The Journey of the Only Woman President of the United States Golf Association.

== Death ==
Glenn lived in Roanoke, Texas. She died of cancer on February 12, 2015, in Gainesville, Florida, aged 68.
