= Raiding =

Raiding may refer to:

- The present participle of the verb raid, which itself has several meanings
- Raid (military)
- Raid (video games), a group of video game players who join forces
- Raiding, Austria, a town in Austria
- Party raiding, a tactic in American politics
