= WAVY-TV =

Television station in Portsmouth, Virginia

- Portsmouth–Norfolk–Newport News–; Virginia Beach, Virginia; United States
- City: Portsmouth, Virginia
- Channels: Digital: 19 (UHF); Virtual: 10
- Branding: WAVY-TV 10; WAVY News 10

Programming
- Affiliations: 10.1: NBC; for others, see § Subchannels

Ownership
- Owner: Nexstar Media Group (sale pending to an unknown third party); (Nexstar Media Inc.)
- Sister stations: WVBT; Tegna: WVEC

History
- First air date: September 1, 1957
- Former channel numbers: Analog: 10 (VHF, 1957–2009); Digital: 31 (UHF, 2001–2020)
- Former affiliations: ABC (1957–1959)
- Call sign meaning: "Wavy" and logo are references to Atlantic Ocean or Chesapeake Bay

Technical information
- Licensing authority: FCC
- Facility ID: 71127
- ERP: 1,000 kW
- HAAT: 280.4 m (920 ft)
- Transmitter coordinates: 36°49′15″N 76°30′40″W
- Translator(s): see § Translators

Links
- Public license information: Public file; LMS
- Website: www.wavy.com

WAVY-TV (channel 10) is a television station licensed to Portsmouth, Virginia, United States, serving the Hampton Roads area as an affiliate of NBC. It is owned by Nexstar Media Group alongside Fox affiliate WVBT (channel 43); Nexstar's Tegna subsidiary owns ABC affiliate WVEC (channel 13). WAVY-TV and WVBT share studios on Wavy Street in downtown Portsmouth; WAVY-TV's transmitter is located in Suffolk, Virginia.

== History ==
WAVY-TV, the Hampton Roads area's third-oldest television station, began operations on September 1, 1957. It was originally owned by Tidewater Teleradio along with WAVY radio (1350 AM, now WGPL). It originally signed on as an ABC affiliate, but traded network affiliations with NBC affiliate WVEC-TV (channel 13) in 1959 due to its radio sister's long affiliation with NBC radio. In 1968, it became the second television station owned by what was then known as LIN Broadcasting.

In April 1989, WAVY-TV moved into its current studio, located on Wavy Street in downtown Portsmouth. The station previously broadcast from a former farmers market on Middle Street, also in downtown Portsmouth. The Wavy Street studio is located across the street from the Atlantic Union Bank Pavilion and near or across the street from the Elizabeth River.

Shortly after WVBT became the area's WB affiliate in 1995, WAVY began operating that station though a local marketing agreement (LMA). LIN TV came to an affiliation agreement with Fox in November 1995, and WVBT took the affiliation from original Fox affiliate WTVZ (channel 33) in 1998. LIN TV purchased that station outright in February 2002. WAVY was the first in the market to broadcast a digital signal in 2001.

On March 21, 2014, Richmond-based Media General announced that it would buy LIN Media in a $1.6 billion deal, described as a "merger." The merger was completed on December 19, at which point WAVY and WVBT came under common ownership with ABC affiliate WRIC-TV in Petersburg (serving the Richmond market).

On September 8, 2015, Media General announced that it would acquire the Des Moines, Iowa–based Meredith Corporation for $2.4 billion with the intention to name the combined group Meredith Media General if the sale were finalized. However, on September 28, Irving, Texas–based Nexstar Broadcasting Group made an unsolicited cash-and-stock merger offer for Media General, originally valued at $14.50 per share. On November 16, following opposition to the merger with Meredith by minority shareholders Oppenheimer Holdings and Starboard Capital (primarily because Meredith's magazine properties were included in the deal, which would have re-entered Media General into publishing after it sold its newspapers to BH Media in 2012 to reduce debt) and the rejection of Nexstar's initial offer by company management, Media General agreed to enter into negotiations with Nexstar on a suitable counter deal, while the Meredith merger proposal remained active; the two eventually concluded negotiations on January 6, 2016, reaching a merger agreement for valued at $17.14 per share (an evaluation of $4.6 billion, plus the assumption of $2.3 billion debt).

On January 27, 2016, Meredith formally broke off the proposed merger with Media General and accepted the termination fee of $60 million previously negotiated under the original merger proposal; Media General subsequently signed an agreement to be acquired by Nexstar, in exchange for giving Meredith right of first refusal to acquire any broadcast or digital properties that may be divested (a clause that Meredith did not exercise). The transaction was approved by the FCC on January 11, 2017; the sale was completed on January 17, at which point the existing Nexstar stations and the former Media General outlets that neither group had to sell in order to rectify ownership conflicts in certain markets became part of the renamed Nexstar Media Group; this brought WAVY-TV and WVBT under common ownership with the Roanoke duopoly of Fox affiliate WFXR and CW affiliate WWCW (which necessitated Media General to sell its NBC-affiliated station in that market, WSLS-TV, to Graham Media Group in order to alleviate said ownership conflict with the two existing Nexstar-owned stations).

On December 3, 2018, Nexstar announced it would acquire the assets of Chicago-based Tribune Media—which has operated CBS affiliate WTKR (channel 3) and CW affiliate WGNT (channel 27) through a shared services agreement with partner company Dreamcatcher Broadcasting since December 2013—for $6.4 billion in cash and debt. Nexstar was precluded from acquiring WTKR/WGNT directly or indirectly while owning WAVY/WVBT, as FCC regulations prohibit common ownership of more than two stations in the same media market, or two or more of the four highest-rated stations in the market. (WAVY and WTKR consistently rank among the top four in terms of total-day viewership in the Norfolk–Virginia Beach–Hampton Roads market, while WVBT and WGNT have occasionally rotated between fourth and fifth place, a situation that allowed for Media General and, later, Nexstar to acquire WVBT directly in their respective group acquisitions involving the WAVY/WVBT duopoly. Furthermore, any attempt by Nexstar to assume the operations of WTKR/WGNT through local marketing or shared services agreements would have been subject to regulatory hurdles that could have delayed completion of the FCC and Justice Department's review and approval process for the acquisition.) As such, on January 31, 2019, Nexstar announced it would retain the WAVY/WVBT duopoly and sell WTKR and WGNT to a different buyer; it was announced on March 20, 2019, that the WTKR/WGNT duopoly, along with sister station WTVR-TV in Richmond, would be sold to the E. W. Scripps Company.

In August 2025, Nexstar agreed to acquire Tegna Inc. for $6.2 billion. In Hampton Roads, Tegna owns WVEC. The deal was approved and completed in March 2026. As part of the transaction, Nexstar committed to the divestiture of WAVY-TV within two years, along with five other stations, mostly in markets where the two companies combined held four TV station licenses.

== News operation ==
WAVY airs thirty hours of local news a week. It operates its own weather radar, called "Super Doppler 10", at its studios. It was the first in the area to air a local morning broadcast at 5:30 a.m., beginning in 1992, and added weeknight newscasts at 5 p.m. in 1989 and 5:30 p.m. in 1994. It is known for being the first Hampton Roads station to use a helicopter to cover local news after introducing "Chopper 10" in 1982. The current Bell 206 Longranger helicopter has been used since 2000. On November 20, 2015; WAVY became the first station in the area to use drone aircraft in their newscasts, known as "Drone 10".

When WVBT made the switch to Fox in 1998, WAVY started producing a nightly 10 p.m. newscast on that station. It was not the market's first prime time show as CBS affiliate WTKR produced a short-lived newscast on WGNT from 1995 until 1997. ABC affiliate WVEC also produced a prime time show on WPEN-LP from 1995 until it started LNC 4 (later LNC 5; now defunct) in 1997. WVEC continued to produce a 10 o'clock news on that station until January 30, 2009. The 45-minute broadcast on WVBT is followed by the Fox 43 Sports Wrap with sports news and highlights.

On July 21, 2008, at noon, WAVY and WVBT became the first stations in the market and their station group company to produce local newscasts in high definition. This is in contrast to rival WVEC's news being produced in 16:9 digital widescreen which is not true high definition but matches the ratio of HD television screens (WVEC would ultimately upgrade their own newscasts to true high definition in August 2013). WVBT added an hour-long extension of WAVY's weekday morning news on February 2, 2009. The show airs in an entertainment-and-lifestyle program format.

Until January 2007, WVBT operated a 24-hour local weather channel on its second digital subchannel 43-2. Known on-air as the "WAVY Weather Station", it was made cable-only in 2007 for unknown reasons. It was seen on Mediacom channel 9, Charter channel 22, and Cox digital channel 227 before going dark in 2011. There were live current conditions, updated forecasts, and a sweep of "Super Doppler 10".

On September 12, 2011, The Hampton Roads Show, an hour-long local lifestyle and entertainment program, moved from WVBT at 8 a.m. to WAVY at 11 a.m. With the move, weekend sports anchor Chris Reckling became co-host.

=== Notable former on-air staff ===
- Betty Ann Bowser – anchor/reporter during the 1960s
- Rich Brenner – sports anchor during the 1970s
- Lloyd Dobyns – news co-anchor and news director from 1960 to 1969 with Vern Jones
- Ahmed Fareed – sports anchor from 2005 to 2010
- Rhonda Glenn – weather reporter, talk show host and anchor in the 1960s and 1970s
- Hillary Howard – former weekend meteorologist during the late 1980s
- Lisa Joyner
- Oren Liebermann
- Diana Morgan
- Byron Pitts – military reporter from 1984 to 1986
- Charles Pugh – anchor/reporter in the 1990s
- Bruce Rader – Virginia Beach reporter and weekend sports anchor from 1976 to 1978 and sports director from 1979 to 2022
- Thomas Roberts – consumer reporter/weekday afternoon co-anchor during the late 1990s
- Marny Stanier – weekend meteorologist
- Stan Verrett
- Kelly Wright
- Terry Zahn – joined as reporter and weekend anchor in 1981, became a lead anchor in 1984, left in 1993

== Technical information ==
=== Subchannels ===
WAVY-TV's transmitter is located in Suffolk, Virginia. The station's signal is multiplexed:

Subchannels of WAVY-TV
Subchannel	Res.	Short name	Programming
10.1	1080i	WAVY	NBC
10.2	480i	Nest	The Nest
10.3	480i	GET-TV	Great
10.4	480i	DEFY	Defy

WAVY-TV added Bounce TV upon its launch on September 26, 2011.

On October 1, 2018, WAVY launched a digital subchannel on virtual channel 10.4 to serve as a charter affiliate of the CBN News Channel, a Christian-oriented news channel owned by the Christian Broadcasting Network. (Incidentally, CBN – which is based in Virginia Beach – previously owned WGNT [channel 27, now an independent station] from 1961 to 1989.)

=== Analog-to-digital conversion ===
WAVY-TV began broadcasting a digital signal on March 22, 2001. The station ended regular programming on its analog signal, over VHF channel 10, at 9 a.m. on June 12, 2009, as part of the federally mandated transition from analog to digital television. The station's digital signal remained on its pre-transition UHF channel 31, using virtual channel 10.

=== Translators ===
In addition to its main signal, WAVY-TV is rebroadcast on three translators. W18EG-D is located in the Eastern Shore of Virginia and is municipally owned by Accomack County rather than Nexstar. WKTD-CD and WITD-CD are owned and operated by Nexstar.

- WKTD-CD 17 Portsmouth
- W18EG-D 18 Onancock
- WITD-CD 23 Chesapeake
