= The Raid =

The Raid may refer to:

== Film ==
- The Raid (1954 film), an American Civil War film
- The Raid (1991 film), a Hong Kong action comedy film
- The Raid (2011 film), an Indonesian action film
- The Raid 2, a 2014 sequel to the Indonesian film

== Literature ==
- The Raid (Tolstoy story), an 1853 short story by Leo Tolstoy
- The Raid (Steinbeck story), a 1934 short story by John Steinbeck
- The Raid, a 1935 novel by W. E. Johns
- The Raid, a 1985 novel by G. Clifton Wisler
- The Raid, a 1986 novel by Arthur Mather
- The Raid, a 1988 novel by Kevin D. Randle under the pen name Eric Helm; the first installment in the Super Vietnam Ground Zero series
- The Raid, a 1997 novel by Randy Lee Eickhoff; the first installment in a series based on the Ulster Cycle

== Television ==
- "The Raid", The Adventures of William Tell episode 30 (1959)
- "The Raid", Armored Trooper Votoms episode 7 (1983)
- "The Raid", Blood of Zeus season 1, episode 3 (2020)
- "The Raid", The Campbells season 3, episode 18 (1990)
- "The Raid", Casualty series 2, episode 7 (1987)
- "The Raid", City of Dreams season 2, episode 2 (2021)
- "The Raid", Enemy at the Door series 2, episode 7 (1980)
- "The Raid", The F.B.I. season 2, episode 15 (1967)
- "The Raid", Gunsmoke season 11, episodes 18–19 (1966)
- "The Raid", Hart to Hart season 1, episode 17 (1980)
- "The Raid", Jayce and the Wheeled Warriors episode 63 (1985)
- "The Raid", No Activity (American) season 1, episode 8 (2017)
- "The Raid", The Rifleman season 1, episode 37 (1959)
- "The Raid", Supernatural season 12, episode 14 (2017)
- "The Raid", Tour of Duty season 3, episode 20 (1990)
- "The Raid", Warship (1973) series 2, episode 1 (1974)

== Other uses ==
- Raid Gauloises, or The Raid, a former event in adventure racing
- "The Raid" (song), a song by King Gizzard & the Lizard Wizard

== See also ==
- Raid (disambiguation)
