= Bournemouth Raiders =

The Bournemouth Raiders was an American football club based in Bournemouth, England. The club folded in May 2006.

== Early days ==
The club was created in 1988 at Bournemouth School for Boys through a group of gridiron football enthusiasts. Starting by playing and learning the game during lunch breaks, the players created a team called the Bournemouth Deckchairs, and in the fall of 1988 played back to back games against the local under-15 team, the Bournemouth Bearcats.

== Colours ==
The team played in black and grey uniforms, the same colours as their namesakes the Las Vegas Raiders.

== League record ==
Season	League	Record	Playoff record
1990	JAFL South West Conference	3–4–1	Did not qualify
1991	JAFL Southern Conference	4–2–0	Defeated Eastleigh Devils 8–6 in Wild-Card game. Lost 6–33 to Newmarket Mustangs in Semi-finals
1992	Did not enter official league	1–0–0 Friendly record	Did not compete
1993–2000	Team inactive	0-0-0	Did not compete
2001	BSFL Southern Conference	3–3–0	Did not qualify
2002	BSFL National Conference (9man)	4–1–1	Defeated Invicta Coyotes 6–0 in Semi-finals. Lost 21–45 to Leicester Eagles in Final
2002	BSFL National Conference (5man)	7–4–2	Finished 1st in Conference claiming national title
2003	BSFL National Conference	8–4–1	Finished 4th in Conference
2004	ESFL National Conference	7–2–0	Finished 1st in Conference claiming national title
2005	ESFL National Conference	1–2–0	Did not qualify for official league standing
2006	ESFL National Conference	1–8–0	Finished 7th in Conference

== All-Time Results ==
Date	Home team	Score	Away team	Venue	Fixture
1990					
March	Bournemouth Raiders	0–9	Eastleigh Royals	Bournemouth School playing fields	Friendly
April	Eastleigh Royals	16–0	Bournemouth Raiders	Redbridge	League
May	Bournemouth Raiders	0–7	Basingstoke Ironsides	Ferndown Sports Centre	League
June	Eastleigh Royals	32–0	Bournemouth Raiders	?	League
June	Basingstoke Ironsides	0–0	Bournemouth Raiders	Basingstoke, Hampshire	League
July	Bournemouth Raiders	4–14	Eastleigh Royals	Ferndown Sports Centre	League
August	Bournemouth Raiders	0–12	Solent Scorpions	Ferndown Sports Centre	Friendly
1991					
April	Eastleigh Devils	14–0	Bournemouth Raiders	Lords Hill playing fields	Friendly
May	Eastleigh Devils	17–6	Bournemouth Raiders	Lords Hill playing fields	League
2 June	Basildon Warriors	0–34	Bournemouth Raiders	Basildon, Essex	League
9 June	Bournemouth Raiders	8–0	Crawley Raiders	Slades Farm, Bournemouth	League
23 June	Bournemouth Raiders	1–0	Eastleigh Devils	Slades Farm, Bournemouth	League
7 July	Crawley Raiders	24–0	Bournemouth Raiders	Crawley Leisure Centre	League
July	Eastleigh Devils	6–8	Bournemouth Raiders	Lords Hill playing fields	League Wild-Card
July	Newmarket Mustangs	33–6	Bournemouth Raiders	Coldhams Common, Cambridge	League Semi-final
1992					
1 November	Worthing Guardians	0–14	Bournemouth Raiders	Worthing, Sussex	Friendly
2001					
4 March	Bournemouth Raiders	6–16	Leicester Eagles	Meyrick Park, Bournemouth	League
4 March	Bournemouth Raiders	20–48	London Gators	Meyrick Park, Bournemouth	League
3 June	Hurricanes	0–1	Bournemouth Raiders	Awarded	League
15 July	Bournemouth Raiders	14–8	Canterbury Coyotes	Brockenhurst College	League
15 July	Bournemouth Raiders	34–0	Brockenhurst Exiles	Brockenhurst College	Friendly
15 July	Bournemouth Raiders	1–0	Hurricanes	Awarded	League
5 August	London Gators	26–0	Bournemouth Raiders	Twickenham Rugby Club, London	League
5 August	Canterbury Coyotes	22–6	Bournemouth Raiders	Twickenham Rugby Club, London	League
16 December	Bournemouth Raiders	25–12	Birmingham Raiders	Meyrick Park	Beach Bowl I, 5man tournament
16 December	Bournemouth Raiders	13–12	Leicester Eagles	Meyrick Park	Beach Bowl I, 5man tournament
16 December	Bournemouth Raiders	18–14	North Devon Dogs	Meyrick Park	Beach Bowl I, 5man tournament
16 December	Bournemouth Raiders	6–22	Southern Sundevils	Meyrick Park	Beach Bowl I, 5man tournament
2002					
21 April	Bournemouth Raiders	66–46	Brighton Tsunami	Hyde Park, London	Friendly
23 June	Bournemouth Raiders	36–8	Chichester Sharks	Bournemouth School playing fields	League
23 June	Bournemouth Raiders	34–0	Brighton Tsunami	Bournemouth School playing fields	League
14 July	Bournemouth Raiders	8–14	Invicta Coyotes	Hyde Park, London	BSFL 5man tournament
14 July	Bournemouth Raiders	6–9	Birmingham Raiders	Hyde Park, London	BSFL 5man tournament
14 July	Bournemouth Raiders	15–12	Leicester Eagles	Hyde Park, London	BSFL 5man tournament
14 July	Bournemouth Raiders	12–12	Invicta Coyotes	Hyde Park, London	BSFL 5man tournament
14 July	Bournemouth Raiders	12–7	Birmingham Raiders	Hyde Park, London	BSFL 5man tournament
14 July	Bournemouth Raiders	14–14	Leicester Eagles	Hyde Park, London	BSFL 5man tournament
11 August	Fen Harriers	6–8	Bournemouth Raiders	Coldhams Common, Cambridge	League
11 August	Invicta Coyotes	12–12	Bournemouth Raiders	Coldhams Common, Cambridge	League
18 August	Chichester Sharks	8–24	Bournemouth Raiders	Chichester, Sussex	League
18 August	Leicester Eagles	10–0	Bournemouth Raiders	Chichester, Sussex	League
8 September	Invicta Coyotes	0–6 (Overtime)	Bournemouth Raiders	Coldhams Common, Cambridge	League Semi-final
8 September	Leicester Eagles	45–21	Bournemouth Raiders	Coldhams Common, Cambridge	League Championship Game
6 October	Leicester Eagles	13–21	Bournemouth Raiders	Chichester, Sussex	BSFL 5man tournament
6 October	Leicester Eagles	8–20	Bournemouth Raiders	Chichester, Sussex	BSFL 5man tournament
6 October	Chichester Sharks	6–25	Bournemouth Raiders	Chichester, Sussex	BSFL 5man tournament
15 December	Bournemouth Raiders	24–0	Brockenhurst Exiles	Redbridge	BSFL Beach Bowl II 5man tournament
15 December	Bournemouth Raiders	6–7	Chichester Sharks	Redbridge	BSFL Beach Bowl II 5man tournament
15 December	Bournemouth Raiders	6–12	Birmingham Raiders	Redbridge	BSFL Beach Bowl II 5man tournament
15 December	Bournemouth Raiders	19–12	Leicester Eagles	Redbridge	BSFL Beach Bowl II 5man tournament
2003					
27 April	Chichester Sharks	14–6	Bournemouth Raiders	Billesley, Birmingham	BSFL Easter Bowl I 5man tournament
27 April	Topgun Miramar	0–18	Bournemouth Raiders	Billesley, Birmingham	BSFL Easter Bowl I 5man tournament
27 April	Team Extreme	18–0	Bournemouth Raiders	Billesley, Birmingham	BSFL Easter Bowl I 5man tournament
27 April	North Devon Dogs	24–7	Bournemouth Raiders	Billesley, Birmingham	BSFL Easter Bowl I 5man tournament
28 September	Bournemouth Raiders	26–0	Team Extreme	Chichester, Sussex	BSFL Autumn Bowl I 5man tournament
28 September	Bournemouth Raiders	19–12	PA Knights	Chichester, Sussex	BSFL Autumn Bowl I 5man tournament
28 September	Bournemouth Raiders	27–6	Sussex Thunder	Chichester, Sussex	BSFL Autumn Bowl I 5man tournament
28 September	Bournemouth Raiders	23–12	Kent Exiles	Chichester, Sussex	BSFL Autumn Bowl I Semi-final
28 September	Bournemouth Raiders	6–6	Chichester Sharks	Chichester, Sussex	BSFL Autumn Bowl I Final (title shared)
14 December	Bournemouth Raiders	21–6	Birmingham Raiders	Eastleigh, Hampshire	BSFL Beach Bowl III
14 December	Bournemouth Raiders	18–6	Sussex Thunder	Eastleigh, Hampshire	BSFL Beach Bowl III
14 December	Bournemouth Raiders	19–0	Southampton Stags	Eastleigh, Hampshire	BSFL Beach Bowl III
14 December	Bournemouth Raiders	6–7	Leicester Eagles	Eastleigh, Hampshire	BSFL Beach Bowl III
2004					
5 June	Bournemouth Raiders	12–0	Troyes Pygargues B (France)	Fareham, Hampshire	IFFF World Cup Qualifier 5man
5 June	Bournemouth Raiders	13–6	Andover Thrashers B	Fareham, Hampshire	IFFF World Cup Qualifier 5man
5 June	Bournemouth Raiders	13–6	North Devon Dogs	Fareham, Hampshire	IFFF World Cup Qualifier 5man Quarter-Final
5 June	Bournemouth Raiders	6–27	Troyes Pygargues A (France)	Fareham, Hampshire	IFFF World Cup Qualifier 5man Semi-final
6 June	Bournemouth Raiders	0–26	Team USA	Fareham, Hampshire	IFFF World Cup Qualifier 9man
6 June	Bournemouth Raiders	0–12	Derby/Chichester	Fareham, Hampshire	IFFF World Cup Qualifier 9man
6 June	Bournemouth Raiders	0–6	Leicester Eagles	Fareham, Hampshire	IFFF World Cup Qualifier 9man Wild-Card
3 October	Bournemouth Raiders	14–0	Bournemouth Deckchairs	Chichester, Sussex	ESFL Autumn Bowl II 5man
3 October	Bournemouth Raiders	9–0	Chichester Sharks	Chichester, Sussex	ESFL Autumn Bowl II 5man
3 October	Bournemouth Raiders	2–14	Barbarians	Chichester, Sussex	ESFL Autumn Bowl II 5man
12 December	Bournemouth Raiders	19–0	Chatham Sharks	Andover	ESFL Beach Bowl IV
12 December	Bournemouth Raiders	0–20	South Wales Rebellion	Andover	ESFL Beach Bowl IV
12 December	Bournemouth Raiders	32–0	Andover Thrashers B	Andover	ESFL Beach Bowl IV
12 December	Bournemouth Raiders	7–6	Chichester Sharks	Andover	ESFL Beach Bowl IV
2005					
11 December	Bournemouth Raiders	27–13	South Wales Rebellion	Lords Hill, Southampton	ESFL Beach Bowl V Quarter-Final
11 December	Bournemouth Raiders	7–21	Kirkcaldy Bulls	Lords Hill, Southampton	ESFL Beach Bowl V Semi-final
11 December	Bournemouth Raiders	0–21	Barbarians	Lords Hill, Southampton	ESFL Beach Bowl V 3rd place playoff
2006					
5 February	Bournemouth Raiders	0–26	Team UA2	West Ruislip, London	ESFL Ruislip Bowl I
5 February	Bournemouth Raiders	0–35	Chichester Sharks	West Ruislip, London	ESFL Ruislip Bowl I
5 February	Bournemouth Raiders	0–12	Fen Harriers	West Ruislip, London	ESFL Ruislip Bowl I
9 April	Bournemouth Raiders	6–33	Chichester Sharks	West Ruislip, London	ESFL Easter Bowl III
9 April	Bournemouth Raiders	0–14	London Liberty	West Ruislip, London	ESFL Easter Bowl III
9 April	Bournemouth Raiders	7–13	Barbarians	West Ruislip, London	ESFL Easter Bowl III
21 May	Bournemouth Raiders	13–25	Leicester Eagles	Chichester Sussex	ESFL Shark Bowl I
21 May	Bournemouth Raiders	6–13	Chichester Sharks	Chichester Sussex	ESFL Shark Bowl I
21 May	Bournemouth Raiders	13–12	Eastbourne Crusaders	Chichester Sussex	ESFL Shark Bowl I

== Tables ==
1990 Table

JGL South West Conference	Won	Lost	Tied
Eastleigh Royals	8	0	0
Basingstoke Ironsides	4	3	1
Bournemouth Raiders	3	4	1
Oxford Bulldogs	0	8	0

1991 Table

JGL Southern Conference	Won	Lost	Tied
Crawley Raiders	5	1	0
Bournemouth Raiders	4	2	0
Eastleigh Devils	3	3	0
Basildon Warriors	0	6	0

2001 Table

BSFL Southern Conference	Won	Lost	Tied	For	Against	%
London Gators	5	0	1	144	34	0.917
Canterbury Coyotes	3	2	1	70	76	0.583
Bournemouth Raiders	3	3	0	64	104	0.500
Hurricanes	0	6	0	12	76	0.000

2002 9man Table

BSFL National Conference	Won	Lost	Tied	For	Against	%
Leicester Eagles	5	0	1	115	26	0.917
Invicta Coyotes	5	0	3	140	52	0.813
Bournemouth Raiders	4	1	1	114	44	0.750
Fen Harriers	3	4	1	134	71	0.438
Brighton Tsunami	1	3	0	26	84	0.250
Chichester Sharks	0	6	0	18	170	0.000
London Hurricanes	0	4	0	14	114	0.000

2002 5man Table

BSFL National Conference	Won	Lost	Tied	For	Against	%
Bournemouth Raiders	7	4	2	188	126	0.615
Leicester Eagles	7	5	1	207	177	0.577
Birmingham Raiders	4	4	0	78	88	0.500
Invicta Coyotes	1	3	1	40	62	0.300
Chichester Sharks	2	5	0	96	138	0.286

2003 Table

BSFL National Conference	Won	Lost	Tied	Pts diff	%
Chichester Sharks	10	2	2	126	0.786
Leicester Eagles	11	3	0	85	0.786
Derby Dream Team	10	4	2	26	0.688
Bournemouth Raiders	8	4	1	84	0.654
Barbarians	5	3	0	13	0.625
Team Extreme	7	5	3	7	0.567
North Devon Dogs	5	6	0	24	0.455
Birmingham Raiders	3	4	1	−19	0.438
Kent Exiles	2	5	0	−29	0.286
Sussex Thunder	1	5	1	−27	0.214
