= General reader =

Audience of nonspecialist literates

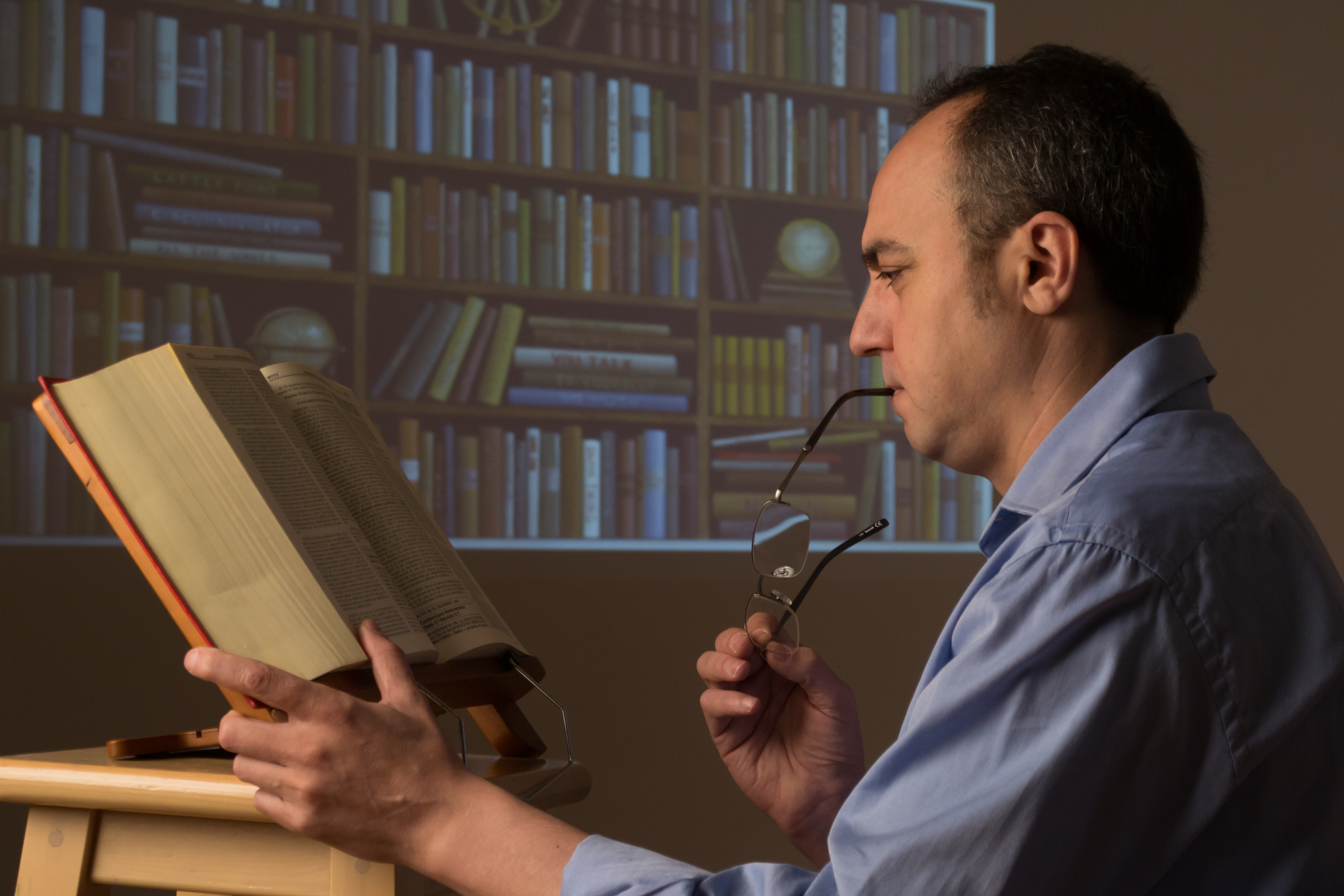
A man reads a book on a lectern.

In nonfictional literature, the general reader is the target audience consisting of those without a specialized knowledge of a particular subject. The American writer Brander Matthews described the general reader as "the average man and woman of average intelligence and of average education." In the Victorian era, the increase in scientific writing for general readers began as access to formal education spread among the general public, leading to the genre known as pop science. The idea of targeting books for general readers has been criticized by academics Alison Jones and Leah Tether, who both consider the concept to be ill-defined and unhelpful for reaching audiences. Tether notes the widespread usage of the term by 1931, with the American librarian Douglas Waples using the term to understand the genres of books which would be most useful to the visitors of a library. In his article "What Subjects Appeal to the General Reader?", Waples explains the difficulty of figuring out the appropriate books to purchase in consideration of the divergent interests of most readers.
