= Dave Rader =

Dave Rader may refer to:

- David Rader (born 1957), Oklahoma state senator, former American football coach and player
- Dave Rader (baseball) (born 1948), retired Major League Baseball player
