= Johan Christopher Ræder (1782–1853) =

Norwegian military officer (1782–1853)

Johan Christopher Ræder (26 November 1782 – 16 July 1853) was a Norwegian military officer. He was of German and Danish descent, and partly served in the Danish army.

== Personal life ==
He was born in Copenhagen as a son of Johan Georg Ræder (1751–1808). The family soon moved to Romsdal, where he grew up. He was the great-grandson of Johan Georg Rhäder, the person who immigrated to Norway and started the family branch there. He was also a brother of Nicolai Ditlev Amund Ræder, Johan Philip Thomas Ræder and Jacob Thode Ræder. In November 1810 in Hals he married Kaja Munch (1794–1874), daughter of the Danish major Ole Munch. They had the children Jacques Ræder, Ole Munch Ræder, Nicolai Ditlev Ammon Ræder and Johan Georg Ræder. Through Nicolai he was the paternal grandfather of Anton Henrik Ræder and Johan Christopher Ræder. Through his Danish brothers he was an uncle of Carl Gustav Valdemar Ræder, Johan Georg Frederik Ræder and Oscar Alexander Ræder and a granduncle of Hans Henning Ræder.

== Career ==
He took his military education in Copenhagen, and an engineer's examination in 1805. He served in the Royal Danish Army, from 1802 to 1805 in the Crown Prince Regiment, and from 1805 to 1809 in the Engineer Corps in Rendsborg. He served in the General Command in Jutland from 1809 and in Norway from January 1810. He served as an engineer officer at Kongsvinger Fortress, and fought in the Swedish campaign against Norway (1814). He served in Kristiania from 1815 to 1818, and in Trondhjem from 1818 to 1842. He was also manager of the engineer education at the Norwegian Military College from 1817 to 1818, and acting board member of the college from 1844 to 1845. He reached the rank of second lieutenant in 1803, captain in 1809/1810, major in 1818, lieutenant colonel in 1828 and colonel in 1842.

After Norway's independence from Denmark in 1814 he experienced a personal crisis, since he was faced with giving up the allegiance to Denmark. He resigned from the Norwegian service, but retracted the resignation. He was even elected to the first session of the Parliament of Norway in 1814. He was later re-elected in 1815, representing the constituency of Hedemarkens Amt.
