= Don Rader =

Don Rader may refer to:

- Don Rader (musician) (born 1935), American jazz trumpeter
- Don Rader (baseball) (1893–1983), Major League Baseball shortstop
