= Ripley Rader =

American fashion designer

- Occupation: Fashion designer
- Years active: 2013–present
- Known for: Ripley Rader clothing label
- Website: ripleyrader.com

Ripley Rader is an American fashion designer who is the founder and creative director of an eponymous clothing label based in Los Angeles.

== Biography ==
Rader's interest in fashion was influenced by her upbringing in West Virginia, where her parents owned a fabric store, and her grandmother taught her sewing. Initially, she moved to Los Angeles to pursue musical theater. However, her career path changed to fashion design after a buyer from Fred Segal took an interest in a homemade jumpsuit she had created.

In 2013, Rader founded her boutique store at Fred Segal, initially focusing on jumpsuits, which coincided with the resurgence of 1970s fashion trends. She chose jumpsuits because they can be worn by a variety of body types. Later, she expanded her range to include other ready-to-wear items such as caftans, shift dresses, wide-leg pants, and crop tops, and introduced a plus-size collection.

Her designed clothes have been worn by celebrities including Alessandra Ambrosio, Amy Schumer, Felicity Huffman, Gigi Hadid, and Kate Upton.
