= Bruce Rader =

American broadcaster

Bruce Reed Rader is an American broadcaster who retired in February 2022 after more than 45 years as sports director at WAVY-TV and WVBT-TV in the Norfolk–Virginia Beach media market. He was the longest-serving active television anchor in the history of Hampton Roads television.

Following his retirement from daily broadcasting, Rader became Vice President of Special Projects for the national media production company Studio Center and was later named Executive Director of the Virginia Sports Hall of Fame. He also continues to serve as an officer and board member of Priority Automotive Charities.

== Early life and career ==
Rader was born at George Washington University Hospital in the Georgetown section of Washington, D.C., to Audrey and Orth Rader. He was raised in the Randolph Hills neighborhood of Rockville, Maryland, where he attended Rocking Horse Road Elementary School and Randolph Junior High School. He graduated from Wheaton High School.

He began his broadcasting career in radio when he was hired by Pierre Eaton, the owner and general manager of hometown station WINX Radio in Rockville. At WINX, Rader hosted a high school sports program, provided play-by-play coverage of local high school football games, and hosted a weekly college basketball program, Terrapin Talk, focusing on the University of Maryland men’s basketball team. During some broadcasts, he was joined by University of Maryland All-American Len Elmore, who later played in the NBA and became a college basketball analyst for CBS Sports and ESPN.

== Television career ==
Rader began his television career in 1974 in the newsroom at WMAL-TV (ABC) in Washington, D.C., during the final days of the Watergate scandal and the resignation of President Richard Nixon. That same year, he worked as a spotter for Washington Redskins play-by-play announcers Mal Campbell and Len Hathaway and produced postgame programming, including the Coach George Allen show and the Chris Hanburger locker room show. He also worked briefly under WMAL-TV sports director Steve Bassett before relocating to Norfolk.

In 1975, Rader was hired by news director Tony Burton as assignment editor at WVEC-TV, the ABC affiliate in Norfolk, Virginia. In 1976, he joined WAVY-TV, then owned by LIN Media (now Nexstar Media Group), as a weekend sports anchor and weekday news reporter covering Virginia Beach. On January 1, 1979, he was named sports director and primary sports anchor.

Known for his energetic presentation style, Rader significantly expanded local sports coverage in the Hampton Roads market. He devoted extensive attention to NASCAR and became one of the first local sportscasters outside Florida to cover the season-opening Daytona 500 annually. He was also the first Hampton Roads sportscaster to regularly cover Washington Redskins games, both home and away.

During coverage of Super Bowl XVII in 1983, Rader delivered the first live newscast in Hampton Roads television history from Costa Mesa, California.

== Community service ==
The Bruce Rader–St. Jude Golf Tournament raised more than US$1 million over its 20-year run for St. Jude Children's Research Hospital.[4] Rader’s charitable foundation was active throughout Hampton Roads, supporting organizations including the Children’s Hospital of the King’s Daughters, Seton Youth Shelters, the Virginia Beach SPCA, and Horizons Hampton Roads.

For more than 30 years, Rader hosted the Jerry Lewis MDA Telethon on WAVY-TV.

== Awards and Honors ==
In 2017, Rader received the Gold and Silver Circle Award from the National Capital Chesapeake Bay Chapter of the National Academy of Television Arts and Sciences, recognizing his lifetime contributions to broadcasting.[6]

In 2022, he was inducted into the Virginia Sports Hall of Fame, two years after becoming the first inductee into the Hampton Roads Sports Media Hall of Fame.[8] He retired from broadcasting in February 2022.[5]
