= Rayder =

Rayder is a surname. Notable people with the surname include:

- Frankie Rayder (born 1975), American fashion model
- Missy Rayder (born 1978), American fashion model
- Mance Rayder, fictional character in the A Song of Ice and Fire novel series and television adaptation

== See also ==
- Ræder, a surname
- Reder, a surname
