= Anton Ræder =

Norwegian educator, philologist and historian

Anton Henrik Ræder
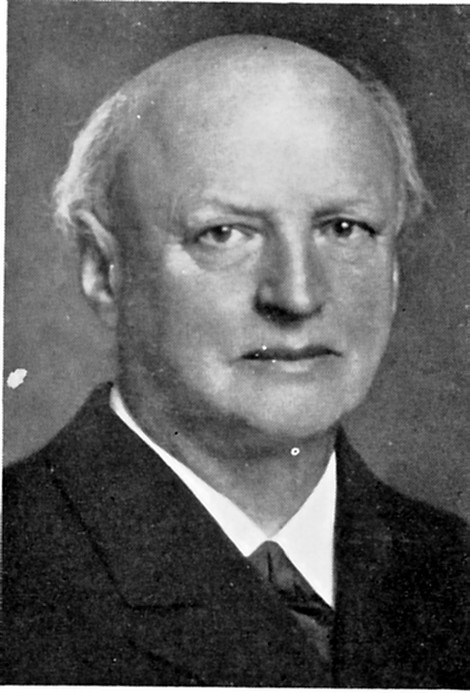
- Born: 25 November 1855; Christiania, Sweden-Norway
- Died: 26 January 1941 (aged 85); Reichskommissariat Norwegen
- Occupations: Educator, philologist and historian
- Parent: Nicolai Ditlev Ammon Ræder
- Relatives: Johan Christopher Ræder (brother); Georg Ræder (uncle); Jacques Ræder (uncle); Ole Munch Ræder (uncle)

Anton Henrik Ræder (25 November 1855 – 26 January 1941) was a Norwegian educator, philologist and historian. He is most commonly known for his history textbooks relating to the Roman Empire.

== Biography ==
Anton Ræder was born in Christiania (now Oslo), Norway. He was the son of jurist Nicolai Ditlev Ammon Ræder (1817–84) and Johanne Cathrine Scheel (1830-1910). He was the brother of military officer Johan Christopher Ræder. His uncles included military officers Georg Ræder and Jacques Ræder as well as diplomat Ole Munch Ræder.

Ræder attended Oslo Cathedral School. He received a classical education in both Latin and Greek history and geography. He earned his doctorate degree during 1893 from the Royal Frederiks University (now University of Oslo) with his thesis Athens politiske udvikling i tiden fra Kleisthenes til Artideide's reform.

From 1898 to 1900, he was the school inspector and head of primary schools in Christiania. From 1900 to 1907, he was the Director General of the Ministry of Church teaching. He served as rector of Oslo Cathedral School from 1907 to 1927. He was a member of the Oslo city council from 1902 to 1907 and was the chairman of Oslo School Board in 1909.

== Personal life ==
Ræder was first married to Astrid Greve (1874-1947). Following her death, he married Mathilde Uchermann, daughter of doctor and professor Vilhelm Uchermann (1852-1929) in 1928.

He was a member of the Norwegian Academy of Science and Letters. In 1883, he was awarded the Crown Prince's gold medal (Kronprinsens gullmedalje). He was Knight, First Class of the Order of St. Olav and Commander, Second Class of the Order of Vasa and of the Order of Dannebrog. He has been portrayed by Johan Nordhagen (painting) and Gustav Vigeland (bust).

== Selected works ==
- Lærebog i Oldtidens Historie for Gymnasiet. 1890.
- Historien i fortællinger for skolen og hjemmet. 1895.
- Kulturhistoriske skildringer fra den romerske keisertid, 1904
- L'Arbitrage international chez les Hellenes, 1912
