= Raid 2 =

Raid 2 may refer to:

- RAID 2, a disk drive array configuration
- Raid 2 (film), a sequel to the 2018 Indian film Raid

== See also ==
- The Raid 2, a 2014 Indonesian film
- Raid (disambiguation)
