= Raid (surname) =

Raid is an Estonian surname. Notable people with the surname include:

- Johan Raid (1885–1964), Estonian politician and civil servant
- Juku-Kalle Raid (born 1974), Estonian politician
- Kaarin Raid (1942–2014), Estonian director, theatre pedagogue and actor
- Kaljo Raid (1921–2005), Estonian composer, cellist and pastor
