= Johan Georg Raeder =

Norwegian ophthalmologist (1889–1959)

Johan Georg Raeder (March 20, 1889, Oslo – 1959) was a Norwegian ophthalmologist known for his studies on glaucoma. The Raeder's paratrigeminal syndrome, a lesion of the middle cranial fossa, and incomplete variation of Horner's syndrome, was named after him.
