= Rehder =

Rehder is a German surname. Notable people with this surname include the following:

- Alfred Rehder (1863–1949), German-American botanist and Harvard professor
- Elke Rehder (born 1953), German artist
- Harald Alfred Rehder (1907–1996), American malacologist
- Heinrich Rehder (1887–1976), German athlete
- Lois Corea Rehder (1911–1988), from the USA, spouse of Harald Alfred Rehder
- Patrícia Rehder Galvão, known as Pagu (1910–1962), Brazilian poet, journalist and translator.
- Tom Rehder (born 1965), American football player

== See also ==
- Reder
- Reeder
