= Brad Rader =

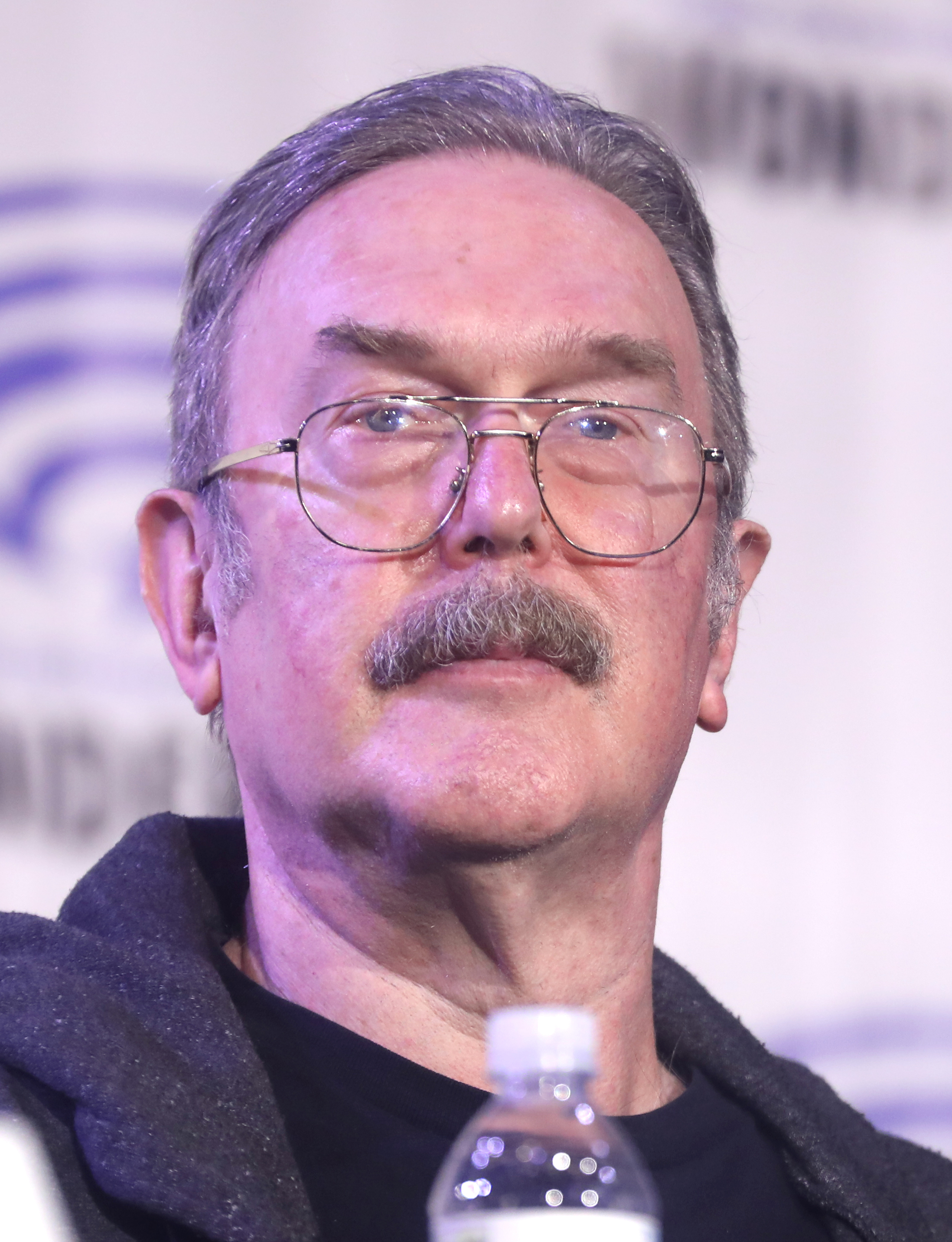
Rader at the 2024 WonderCon

Brad Rader, who has sometimes signed his art Raider, is an American comic book creator, storyboard artist and animation director. He won his Emmy in 1999 for his work on Todd McFarlane's Spawn.

Rader's comic work include the original noir graphic novel Fogtown for Vertigo and the self-published homoerotic graphic novel Harry and Dickless Tom; Catwoman, Gotham Adventures, and Batman Adventures for DC Comics.

== Personal life ==
Rader was raised in Anchorage, Alaska, and now lives in Los Angeles, California.
