= Norwegian Military College =

Coordinates: 59°54′28″N 10°44′17″E

The Norwegian Military College (Norwegian: Den militære høyskole) was a military educational institution in Norway.

It was established on 16 February 1817, with headquarters at Akershus Fortress. It was originally meant for artillery and engineer officers, and in 1826 it was expanded to include naval officers; however, not many naval officers actually attended.

There were several changes in the length of the education offered at the Military College. From 1901 a two-year course was offered, educating personnel to the General Staff. The school had been mandatory for General Staff members since 1850. The school ceased to operate in 1940, the same year as Norway was invaded and occupied by Germany.
