= Jacques Ræder =

Norwegian military officer (1831–1920)

Hans Jacob "Jacques" Theodor Wilhelm Ræder (19 March 1831 – 3 June 1920) was a Norwegian military officer.

== Biography ==
He was born on 19 March 1831, in Trondhjem, to Johan Christopher Ræder and Kaja Munch. He was a grandson of Johan Georg Ræder, brother of Nicolai Ditlev Ammon Ræder, Johan Georg Ræder, and Ole Munch Ræder, and an uncle of Anton Henrik Ræder and Johan Christopher Ræder. In May 1867, in Copenhagen he married his own first cousin, Francisca M. M. Ræder (1841–1927).

He was a military officer in the infantry before attending the Norwegian Military College, where he graduated in 1855. He mainly spent his career in the General Staff before leading Norske Jegerkorps from 1882 to 1888 and Østerdalens Korps from 1888 to 1890. From 1890 to 1899, he was the commander of Fredriksten Fortress. He reached the rank of Second Lieutenant in 1851, Premier Lieutenant in 1857, Captain in 1862, Major in 1873, Lieutenant Colonel in 1875, Colonel in 1888 and Major General in 1890. He retired in 1899, and died in March 1920 in Vestre Aker.
