= Reder =

Reder is a German surname. Notable people with the surname include:

- Bernard Reder (1887–1964), artist from Czernowitz, Bukovina
- Kristiaan Reuder or Christian Reder (1656 – 1729), German painter
- Deanna Reder, Canadian academic
- Gigi Reder born Luigi Schroeder; (1928 – 1998), Italian actor
- Hedwig Reder maiden name of Hedwig Kettler (1851 – 1937), German women's rights activist
- Johnny Reder (1909–1990), Polish-American sportsman
- József Réder (1951 – 2008), Hungarian boxer
- Peter Reder (born 1960), British artist
- Rudolf Reder a.k.a. Roman Robak (1881 – 1977), concentration camp survivor
- Walter Reder (1915–1991), German SS officer
- Wanda Reder, American energy executive

== See also ==
- Reeder (disambiguation)
- Rehder
