= Georg Ræder =

Norwegian military officer, railway pioneer and politician

Johan Georg Ræder (21 March 1814 – 3 January 1898) was a Norwegian military officer, railway pioneer and politician. He was a driving force in the construction of Norway's first railway line, the Hoved Line from Christiania to Eidsvoll, which opened in 1854.

== Personal life ==
Ræder was born in Kongsvinger as the son of Johan Christopher Ræder and Karen Sophie Hedevig Munch. He was the brother of Ole Munch Ræder, Jacques Ræder and Nicolai Ditlev Ammon Ræder. and uncle of Anton Ræder. He married Thora Caroline Munch in 1844.

== Career ==
Ræder started his military career as second lieutenant in 1833. He graduated from the Military College in 1837, and was then assigned with the Engineering Brigade (Norwegian: Ingeniørbrigaden).

He was in charge of the construction of the road over Filefjell around 1840. From 1842 to 1843 he studied in France and England, where he learned about railway construction. In 1843 he was engaged by timber merchants Westye Egeberg and Carsten Tank Egeberg, to carry out investigation and siting of a railroad line from Christiania to Eidsvoll, and delivered his report in 1844. He was selected to be a member of the first Norwegian railway commission in 1845. Ræder was a driving force in the commission, and also a member of the supervising committee for the construction of Norway's first railway line, the Hoved Line from Christiania to Eidsvoll. The line opened in 1854. He was also a member of the board of directors of the Hoved Line, from 1853 to 1855.

Ræder was a member of the City Parliament of Christiania from 1849 to 1876. He was suppleant to the Parliament of Norway from 1862 to 1863, from 1865 to 1866, and from 1874 to 1879. He was director of the Norwegian Military College from 1864 to 1894. He had the rank of major general from 1872, and lieutenant general from 1888. At the crowning ceremony of King Oscar II in the Nidaros Cathedral in 1873 he carried the Royal Sword. A painting by Knud Bergslien from 1874 depicting this ceremony is located at the Royal Palace in Oslo. He was a member of several public commissions, and wrote many articles for the magazine Norsk Militært Tidsskrift. He was decorated Commander, First Class of the Order of St. Olav, received the Grand Cross of the Order of the Sword and the Grand Cross of the Prussian Order of the Red Eagle.
