= Nicolai Ditlev Ammon Ræder =

Norwegian jurist and civil servant

Nicolai Ditlev Ammon Ræder (16 September 1817 – 22 July 1884) was a Norwegian jurist and civil servant.

Ræder was born at Kongsvinger in Hedmark, Norway. He was the son of Johan Christopher Ræder and Karen Sophie Hedevig Munch. He was the brother of Ole Munch Ræder, Jacques Ræder and Johan Georg Ræder.

A jurist by education, he worked as a government official in various government ministries, and as a bailiff (fogd) in Hallingdal.

In 1870, he became County Governor of Nordre Bergenhus amt, which he held until 1875 when he became County Governor of Søndre Bergenhus amt. He held this position until his death in 1884.

Government offices
Preceded by Johan Collett Falsen	County Governor of Nordre Bergenhus amt 1870–1875	Succeeded by Carl Lauritz Mechelborg Oppen
Preceded by Paul Meyer Smit	County Governor of Søndre Bergenhus amt 1875–1884	Succeeded by Justin Gottfried Andreas Hoffmann
