= Ole Munch Ræder =

Norwegian jurist and diplomat

- Born: 3 May 1815; Kongsvinger, Norway
- Died: 10 March 1895 (aged 79)
- Occupation(s): Jurist and diplomat
- Father: Johan Christopher Ræder

Ole Munch Ræder (3 May 1815 – 10 March 1895) was a Norwegian jurist and diplomat.

== Biography ==
He was born at Kongsvinger in Hedmark, Norway. He was the son of Johan Christopher Ræder and Karen Sophie Hedevig Munch. He was the brother of Jacques Ræder, Johan Georg Ræder and Nicolai Ditlev Ammon Ræder. His father was a Norwegian military officer and his maternal grandfather had been a Danish military officer.

He grew up in Trondheim and in 1832 graduated at Trondheim Cathedral School. In 1839, he graduated as a cand. jur. (candidatus juris; a title given to individuals who have completed a law degree in certain European countries) from the Royal Frederik University in Kristiania (now Oslo, Norway).

He joined the Norwegian Audit Department in 1839 as the Norwegian Ministry of Justice in 1840. During the years 1842-1844, he traveled to Denmark, Germany, Switzerland, and Italy. Also, he went to the United States, with state support to study various jury systems from 1846-1849.

He was consul for Sweden-Norway at Malta from 1861 to 1869, in Alexandria from 1869 to 1871, at Malta from 1871 to 1874, and in Hamburg from 1874 to 1891. He took leave and returned to Norway in 1891.

He was Commander, First Class of the Order of St. Olav and Commander, First Class of the Order of Vasa.

== Selected works ==
- Den norske Statsforfatnings Historie og Væsen. 1841.
- Jury-Institutionen i Storbritanien, Canada og de forenede Stater af Amerika. 1852.
