= Biker Mice from Mars (disambiguation) =

Biker Mice from Mars is an animated television series from 1993 to 1996.

Biker Mice from Mars may also refer to:

- Biker Mice from Mars (1994 video game), a Konami overhead racing game based on the 1990s television series
- Biker Mice from Mars (2006 TV series), a remake of the original 1990s television series
- Biker Mice from Mars (2006 video game), a Game Factory racing battle based on the 2006 television series
