= Cuboid (disambiguation) =

A cuboid is a polyhedron with six quadrilateral faces.

It may also refer to:

- Rectangular cuboid, a cuboid with all right angles and equal opposite faces
- Cuboid (computer vision), a feature used for behavior recognition in video
- Cuboid (video game), a puzzle game for the PlayStation Network
- Cuboid bone, one of seven tarsal bones in the human foot
- Cuboid syndrome, a medical condition of the human foot
