= List of Biker Mice from Mars episodes =

Biker Mice from Mars is an American action animated series created by Rick Ungar. The series premiered in syndication the week of September 19, 1993. It consists of three seasons of 65 episodes, with the final episode airing in syndication the week of February 24, 1996. A 2006 revival series based on the original was also produced, consisting of one season of 28 episodes.

== Series overview ==
Season	Episodes	Originally released	
Season	Episodes	First released	Last released
1	13	September 19, 1993	December 12, 1993
2	39	September 20, 1994	June 23, 1995
3	13	September 23, 1995	February 24, 1996

== Episodes ==
=== Season 1 (1993) ===
No. overall	No. in season	Title	Directed by	Written by	Original release date
1	1	"Rock and Ride!"	Tom Tataranowicz	Rick Ungar, Bob Forward & Tom Tataranowicz	September 19, 1993
Throttle, Modo and Vinnie—The Biker Mice from Mars—escape their planet as it is devastated by the fish-faced Plutarkians. Crash landing in Chicago, the renegade rodents soon discover the Plutarkians have selected their next target for destruction: Earth. Led by his "supreme cheesiness", Lawrence Limburger and his devilish cohorts Greasepit and the fiendish Dr. Karbunkle, the Plutarkians are already undermining the Windy City. It's tail whippin' time 'cause the baddest motorcycle mammajammers in the universe are riding to the rescue. Their first mission has them fighting against X-Terminator.
2	2	"The Reeking Reign of the Head Cheese: Part 1"	Tom Tataranowicz	Bob Forward & Eve Forward	September 25, 1993
Limburger gets a big blasting from his Supreme Leader Lord Camembert after the Biker Mice defeat Lectromag. To get back in the big cheese's good books, Limburger hatches a stinking plan—he kidnaps the Mayor of Chicago and frames the Biker Mice for the crime.
3	3	"The Reeking Reign of the Head Cheese: Part 2"	Tom Tataranowicz	Bob Forward & Eve Forward	October 2, 1993
The Biker Mice have to work double time to clear their names in court to the judge and save the mayor before Chief of Police Greasepit jails them. Limburger then enlists the help of Tunnel Rat, a repulsive rodent who enjoys tearing mice and the ground to pieces.
4	4	"We Don't Need No Stinkin' City"	Tom Tataranowicz	Pamela Hickey & Dennis McCoy	October 9, 1993
Limburger calls in the Loogie Brothers, also known as the "Scum of the Universe", to stink up Chicago badly enough to drive the citizens out.
5	5	"A Mouse and His Motorcycle"	Tom Tataranowicz	Bob Forward	October 16, 1993
Limburger hatches a plan to use a toxic substance to help take Chicago's dirt- but he needs Modo's bike for the plan to succeed. Modo getting dipped in said toxic substance puts a slight dent in the Biker Mice's efforts to get his bike back.
6	6	"Test of Friendship"	Tom Tataranowicz	Julianne Klemm	October 23, 1993
Limburger hires three villains: Evil Eye Weevil and his aides The Pukes of Hazzard. Evil Eye has the ability to induce hostility in people, and successfully drives the Biker Mice apart long enough for him and the Pukes of Hazzard to capture two of them. But one's still on the loose...
7	7	"The Masked Motorcyclist"	Tom Tataranowicz	Eve Forward	October 30, 1993
A mysterious female biker helps out the Mice in battling against Corroder Cody who Limburger hired to purloin the oil refineries.
8	8	"The Pits"	Tom Tataranowicz	Bob Forward	November 6, 1993
The Biker Mice realize that Limburger is not the only evil character in town when they attempt to stop a bank robbery. Throttle and Modo take a leap into the Pits, a crater filled with some of the baddest scum and villainy, and are condemned to slave life by the Pit Boss. Now it's up to Vinnie to save his two bros.
9	9	"Road Ravens"	Tom Tataranowicz	Pamela Hickey & Dennis McCoy	November 13, 1993
Two of the Biker Mice are injured when a gang called the Road Ravens led by Jimmy Mac steal oil from tankers. Throttle and Charley must do a bit of undercover work to bust the gang up from within, while Modo and Vinnie recuperate to prevent more oil stealing.
10	10	"A Scent, a Memory, a Far Distant Cheese"	Tom Tataranowicz	Bob Forward	November 20, 1993
When Limburger disappears after the teleporter is damaged during his attempts to recruit new monsters Munsterella and Gorgonzola to battle the Biker Mice, his unintentional replacements turn out to be increasingly more powerful and evil, forcing Charley to repair the teleporter to bring Limburger back in the hopes that he can reveal the new villains' weaknesses. Limburger and Karbunkle find themselves on the Black Rock Asteroid Station where the supervillains X-Terminator, Lectromag, Tunnel Rat, the Loogie Brothers, Evil Eye Weevil, and Corroder Cody confront them for not paying them.
11	11	"Steelfinger"	Tom Tataranowicz	Bob Forward	November 27, 1993
In order to ensure his scheme to grab all the steel from Chicago, Limburger tempts Modo away from his bros with a new metal arm.
12	12	"Chill Zone"	Tom Tataranowicz	Eve Forward	December 5, 1993
The Biker Mice must stop Limburger's plan to steal all of Earth's water using his giant snow suckers which would ruin not only Christmas, but the whole of winter too. They also must contend with Karbunkle's old friend Weathermeister.
13	13	"Hard Rock"	Tom Tataranowicz	Bob Forward	December 12, 1993
Hard Rock, a rocker with a nasty guitar, is forced into working for Limburger. And it seems the Biker Mice remember this bad boy from when he was really working for Plutark... and decimated Mars.

=== Season 2 (1994–95) ===
No. overall	No. in season	Title	Directed by	Written by	Original release date
14	1	"Steal of the Century"	Tom Tataranowicz	Eve Forward	September 20, 1994
With the Pulverizer on his side, Limburger decides to steal the newest piece of military destructive weaponry, the Annihilator.
15	2	"We're Going to Cheesyland"	Tom Tataranowicz	Greg Blair	September 21, 1994
Limburger decides to buy a theme park and to hide his mining operations there, so it's up to the guys to make sure that Cheesyland doesn't leave the Windy City full of holes.
16	3	"Stone Broke"	Tom Tataranowicz	Bob Forward	September 22, 1994
After losing his funding, Limburger has a wonderfully devious plan to get back in the High Chairman's good graces. This leads the mice and Charley in a race to save Mount Rushmore from Limburger and his latest villain Stone Cutter.
17	4	"The Motor City Maniac"	Tom Tataranowicz	Bob Forward & Richard Mueller	September 26, 1994
Limburger's old Plutarkian rival Napoleon Brie decides to try and take over Chicago.
18	5	"Upwardly Mobile"	Tom Tataranowicz	Greg Johnson	September 28, 1994
Limburger's new plan is to literally cut the city free from the Earth and eject it to Plutark with the help of the villain Jet Blaster.
19	6	"Last Stand at Last Chance"	Tom Tataranowicz	Dennis O'Flaherty	September 29, 1994
The mice and Charley must race to save the Last Chance when Limburger manages to get the building legally condemned with the help of the villain Catscan.
20	7	"Back to Mars: Part 1"	Tom Tataranowicz	Bob Forward & Eve Forward	October 3, 1994
When the Biker Mice finally capture Limburger, they bring him to Mars for a trial and are thrown in prison for treason by General Carbine. While the Mice also contend with Slobber the Mutt and his Sand Raiders, Napoleon Brie moves in on Chicago.
21	8	"Back to Mars: Part 2"	Tom Tataranowicz	Bob Forward & Eve Forward	October 4, 1994
The Mice must stop Limburger's latest machine from annihilating Mars. The machine attracts asteroids to the planet to bring complete destruction.
22	9	"Back to Mars: Part 3"	Tom Tataranowicz	Bob Forward & Eve Forward	October 5, 1994
The Biker Mice must oust Napoleon Brie from Chicago where he's taken over in Limburger and the mice's absence.
23	10	"The Tribunal"	Tom Tataranowicz & Richard Trueblood	Greg Johnson	October 10, 1994
In this clip show episode, the Biker Mice are put on trial for their crimes against Limburger.
24	11	"Motocross Trap"	Tom Tataranowicz	Ben Mattlin	October 12, 1994
Limburger decides to lure the Biker Mice into a trap that will put them against Evil Eye Weevil, the Pukes of Hazard, and the Loogie Brothers with Vinnie's Motocross title on the line as the prize. Limburger also has a side mission to level Quigley Field.
25	12	"Unforgiven Cheese"	Tom Tataranowicz	Eve Forward	October 13, 1994
A female bounty hunter named Billie Monnie is present in the Windy City and she's after Limburger... at first.
26	13	"Bleu Cheese Bros"	Tom Tataranowicz	Katherine Lawrence	October 17, 1994
When Limburger takes over as warden for a prison, Charley and the Mice find out a way to stop him by trying to get into jail.
27	14	"The Inquisition"	Tom Tataranowicz & John Cataldi	Greg Johnson	October 19, 1994
In this clip show, Lord Camembert and the other Plutarkian leaders are furious with Limburger for failing to capture the Last Chance Garage. Limburger must prove himself worthy.
28	15	"Stalkers"	Tom Tataranowicz	Bob Forward	October 22, 1994
When intergalactic game hunters called Stalkers catch Modo's nephew Rimfire, he manages to escape in their ship and finds himself on Earth.
29	16	"I, Greasepit"	Richard Trueblood	Greg Johnson	October 24, 1994
Limburger's incompetence finally lands him a demotion from Lord Camemberg. When the High Chairman appoints Greasepit in his place, he is actually able to capture The Last Chance garage.
30	17	"Villain of the Year"	Tom Tataranowicz	Greg Johnson	October 25, 1994
In this clip show, Limburger invites a whole crapola of villains like Billie Monnie, Catscan, Corroder Cody, Evil Eye Weevil, Jet Blaster, Lectromag, Munsterella and Gorgonzola, Pit Boss, Pulverizer, Slobber the Mutt, Stone Cutter, Tunnel Rat, and Weathermeister to a convention to hold the Villain of the Year awards... and the prize is the Biker Mice.
31	18	"Cheeseloggers"	Tom Tataranowicz	Dennis O'Flaherty	October 27, 1994
Limburger uses the gene scrambler to steal trees while Karbunkle and Fred are caught in the gene scrambler's rays and are scrambled together.
32	19	"Hickory Dickory Doc"	Tom Tataranowicz	Greg Johnson	October 31, 1994
The mice must travel back to the time of the dinosaurs to keep Chicago from disappearing before it was ever built.
33	20	"Die Fledermice"	Tom Tataranowicz	Bob Forward	November 2, 1994
The Mice and Charley must travel to Kansas to stop Limburger from stealing all the grain from the nation's breadbasket.
34	21	"Law of the Pits"	Tom Tataranowicz	Bob Forward	November 7, 1994
A friend is framed for a crime he didn't do and Pit Boss captures Charley.
35	22	"Danger Is Our Business"	Tom Tataranowicz	Jess Winfield	November 15, 1994
The Mice are cast as stuntmen for a film, shooting in the local area, but problems with the star and the director, and unhealthy plans for the filming locations make for a dangerous day on the job.
36	23	"Mad Scientist Wanted"	Bob Hathcock	Greg Johnson	November 17, 1994
In this clip show, both Charley and Karbunkle get whisked away when execs for a galactic company try to convince their boss that their pick is the better scientist.
37	24	"Lake Michi-Gone"	Tom Tataranowicz	Jess Winfield	November 18, 1994
Limburger decides to take all the water of Lake Michigan to pollute and send to Plutark as designer water. In order to pull it off, he enlists the Plutarkian trucker Mudfish Murdock.
38	25	"Seeds of Victory"	Tom McLaughlin, Jr.	Bob Forward	November 23, 1994
General Carbine lands in Chicago to steal the last remaining specimen of a plant that is desperately needed for the Martian ecology to survive.
39	26	"Pwetty Wady"	Tom Tataranowicz	Bruce Shelly & Reed Shelly	December 1, 1994
Limburger finds himself in an interesting situation when a run-in leaves him with an admirer....Napoleon Brie.
40	27	"My Cheese Is Quick"	Tom McLaughlin, Jr.	Pamela Hickey & Dennis McCoy	December 15, 1994
Charley is thrown in jail for the supposed murder of Limburger.
41	28	"Verminator"	Richard Trueblood	Jess Winfield	December 23, 1994
Modo's arm has to be replaced, but things get weird when Vinnie's plan backfires and Karbunkle creates an evil robot based on Vinnie, including his ego and knowledge. And Vinnie is forced to control the robot.
42	29	"Cheese Cadets"	Tom McLaughlin, Jr.	Greg Johnson	January 9, 1995
Limburger's minions go on strike.
43	30	"So Life Like"	Tom Tataranowicz	Greg Blair & Greg Johnson	January 19, 1995
Karbunkle has a machine that can remove comic book characters from their pages. After using the comic villains Saddle Sore and Deathmaster, Limburger decides that the best way to defeat the mice is with evil versions of themselves.
44	31	"Garbage Wars"	Tom Tataranowicz	Bruce Shelly, Reed Shelly & Greg Johnson	January 26, 1995
Limburger disrupts Chicago's garbage service in order to bomb Chicago with stink bombs. He brings the Loogie Brothers back as his villains of choice for the task.
45	32	"Vicious Cycles"	Tom Tataranowicz	Bruce Reid Schaefer	February 9, 1995
In Limburger's latest plot, he manages to infect the mice's bikes with help from the Mechanic, making them turn on their riders.
46	33	"Cycle Centaurs"	Tom Tataranowicz	Sean C. Derek	February 16, 1995
Limburger produces villains using DNA from the Mice and combines it with material from their bikes, making mouse/motorcycle-like centaurs called Cycletaurs.
47	34	"Modo Hangs It Up"	Tom Tataranowicz	Mark Sarceni	February 22, 1995
Limburger has the unpleasant task of baby-sitting his nephew whom he manages to figure into a plan that leaves Modo wondering if he should remain a hero or not.
48	35	"What Smells Worse Than a Plutarkian Lawyer?"	Tom Tataranowicz	Greg Johnson	March 1, 1995
Provolone, a Plutarkian lawyer, is involved with getting the Mice's bikes impounded, while the Mice must stop a meltdown at the local nuclear reactor thanks to the lawyer.
49	36	"Below the Horizon"	Tom Tataranowicz	Greg Johnson	March 9, 1995
The guys manage to mess up the launch of Limburger's satellite, but must race Limburger and the villain Icebreaker to the North Pole before Limburger retrieves it and relaunches it.
50	37	"Big Trouble"	Tom Tataranowicz	Greg Johnson	March 13, 1995
Dr. Karbunkle creates an inflation machine which turns Greasepit into a giant. To make matters worse... Greasepit falls in love with Charley!
51	38	"Academy of Hard Knocks"	Tom Tataranowicz	Greg Johnson	April 20, 1995
In this clip show, Limburger hires a whole new bunch of goons. Before he can send them after Brie, he has to have them trained first.
52	39	"High Rollin' Rodents"	Robert Hathcock	Robert McFadden, Alan Gibson, Bruce Shelly & Reed Shelly	June 23, 1995
When Limburger opens a new casino island, the Biker Mice needs to travel there to beat him at his own game when he uses less than honest means to win the land from many Chicago citizens.

=== Season 3 (1995–96) ===
No. overall	No. in season	Title	Directed by	Written by	Original release date
53	1	"Biker Knights of the Round Table: Part 1"	Tom Tataranowicz	Glenn Leopold	September 23, 1995
The Biker Mice from Mars must travel back to King Arthur's time and stop Limburger from stealing half of England, and destroying Camelot with the help of Morgan le Fay and Mordred.
54	2	"Biker Knights of the Round Table: Part 2"	Richard Trueblood	Glenn Leopold	September 30, 1995
Still trapped in the past, the Mice must race against time to not only thwart Limburger's scheme, but also to help Merlin come up with a gasoline substitute for their rapidly depleting fuel supplies.
55	3	"Virtual Unreality"	Tom Tataranowicz	Jess Winfield	October 7, 1995
Jack McCyber, an old friend of Charley's arrive in Chicago, with an incredibly unique virtual helmet that Limburger is determined to take.
56	4	"Pitfall"	Tom Tataranowicz	Greg Johnson	October 14, 1995
On the way to Earth with proof that Lord Camembert is embezzling Plutarkian funds, Provolone's ship malfunctions and he lands in the Pits where the mice meet up with Four-By to fight the Pit Boss and get rid of Provolone.
57	5	"Diet of Worms"	Tom Tataranowicz	Jess Winfield	October 21, 1995
The Mice have to deal with a meeting in Chicago of several of the largest Plutarkian bosses like Gerald Guyere, Jack Monteray, and Gutama Gouda on Earth and stop a Plutarkian invasion that Lord Camenbert is leading. While Limburger covers for Brie who came down with salmonella poisoning, the other three Plutarkian bosses gain a supervillain to aid them: Gerard Gruyere gets Mechanic, Gutama Gouda gets a Cycletaur, and Jack Monteray gets X-Terminator.
58	6	"Rocketh and Rideth"	Tom Tataranowicz	Jess Winfield	November 4, 1995
Limburger uses Karbunkle's newest machine to steal the land from fictional places in Shakespeare's plays. This resulted in the destruction of the plays, and they ceased to exist. So, the Biker Mice must enter the well-known stories to stop him, but first Charley must convince them that Shakespeare is worth saving.
59	7	"Too Many Limburgers Spoil the Cheese"	Tom Tataranowicz	Cydne Clark & Steve Granat	November 11, 1995
Karbunkle's latest invention creates multiple clones of Limburgers.
60	8	"Hit the Road, Jack"	Tom Tataranowicz	Greg Blair & Glenn Leopold	November 18, 1995
Asphalt Jack returns to Chicago to visit Charley and friends with his fiancé, but the visit turns sour when Jack and his new cyber bike are captured and the guys must rescue him while Limburger and Brie deal with a quadruple, triple, double agent who has deals with more than just the two Plutarkians. The agent in question is a Plutarkian known as Romana Parmesana.
61	9	"Caveat Mentor"	Tom Tataranowicz	Glenn Leopold	November 25, 1995
While Rimfire and Stoker arrive on Earth with a typical Martian male landing, Limburger creates a new scheme to brainwash everyone using shampoo. But the Mice are in trouble when Stoker seems to have lost his fighting abilities to old age.
62	10	"Where No Mouse Has Gone Before"	Tom Tataranowicz	Jess Winfield	January 3, 1996
The Biker Mice have been mysteriously transported to Plutark with a bunch of scrap metal from a local junkyard. This turns out to be a good thing for Limburger and he uses it to give himself a shot at being elected High Chairman.
63	11	"Once Upon a Time on Mars: Part 1"	Tom Tataranowicz	Greg Johnson, Glenn Leopold & Jess Winfield	February 10, 1996
Limburger is ready to use a new device, a Tug Transformer, to bring Earth into Plutark's orbit. The Biker Mice recall when the Plutarkians tried the same tactic with Mars.
64	12	"Once Upon a Time on Mars: Part 2"	Tom Tataranowicz	Greg Johnson, Glenn Leopold & Jess Winfield	February 17, 1996
Limburger is about to make Earth one of the newest moons of Plutark as the Biker Mice reveal to Charley about the time they dealt with the same problem back on Mars.
65	13	"Once Upon a Time on Mars: Part 3"	Tom Tataranowicz	Greg Johnson, Glenn Leopold & Jess Winfield	February 24, 1996
The Biker Mice retell the stories of how Modo got his arm, Vinnie his mask, Throttle his eyes, and a betrayal that resulted in the disappearance of a friend named Harley.
