= BraveStarr: The Movie =

1988 film

- Theatrical release poster
- Directed by: Tom Tataranowicz
- Written by: Bob Forward; Steve Hayes
- Produced by: Lou Scheimer
- Starring: Charlie Adler; Susan Blu; Pat Fraley; Ed Gilbert; Alan Oppenheimer
- Edited by: Ludmilla P. Saskova
- Music by: Frank W. Becker
- Production company: Filmation
- Distributed by: Taurus Entertainment
- Release dates: March 18, 1988 (North America); June 24, 1988 (United Kingdom)
- Running time: 91 minutes
- Country: United States
- Language: English

BraveStarr: The Movie (released as BraveStarr: The Legend in Europe and as The Legend of BraveStarr in the Philippines) is a 1988 American animated space Western film released on March 18, 1988, by Taurus Entertainment. The film was based on Filmation's television series and Mattel's action figure of the same name, and it was also among the first animated features to use computer graphics.

The film tells the story of the original discovery of Kerium (a fictional ore that serves as the main plot element of the TV series), and how the Galactic Marshall Bravestarr came to battle Tex Hex (a wanted outlaw) and his master Stampede (an evil spirit in the form of a bull skull) on the planet of New Texas. It also introduces his allies: J.B. (a female judge), Thirty/Thirty (his talking horse, who can become bipedal and fight on his own), Deputy Fuzz (one of the Prairie People, the original indigenous people of New Texas), and the Shaman (BraveStarr's mentor who helps him discover his animal-based powers).

The PAL-based European version of the movie has been released to Region 1 DVD in a 2-disc set on July 3, 2007, release called The Best of BraveStarr from BCI Eclipse, with the second disc being five fan chosen 'best of' episodes from the TV series. The movie received its own single DVD release on May 6, 2008.

Unlike The Secret of the Sword (which was an edited version of the first five She-Ra episodes), the BraveStarr movie was produced and released following the conclusion of the TV series.

Sharing the same fate as the toy and TV show, the film received positive reviews from critics, but it was not a box-office success, playing only to weekend matinées in limited markets. The commercial failure of Bravestarr: The Movie, combined with that of the previous Filmation release Pinocchio and the Emperor of the Night, led to the studio's collapse. A year after its release, Filmation closed down for good; its last full-length production, Happily Ever After, did not premiere until 1993.

== Plot ==
Far out in space on New Texas, a single marshal protects a frontier people from the evil machinations of Stampede and his lackey, Tex Hex.

== Cast ==
- Charlie Adler as Deputy Fuzz / Tex Hex
- Susan Blu as Judge J.B.
- Pat Fraley as Marshall Bravestarr / Thunder Stick
- Ed Gilbert as Shaman / Thirty-thirty
- Alan Oppenheimer as Stampede / Outlaw Skuzz

== Reception ==
Reviewing Bravestarr: The Movie, Charles Solomon stated "Although "Bravestarr: The Legend" is a more polished effort than Filmation’s recent “Pinocchio and the Emperor of the Night,” pacing remains a problem and the climactic battles fizzle like damp fireworks." However, Solomon did praise the film's computer animation: "The film boasts some impressive computer-generated special effects...the three-dimensional renderings of machines move in realistic perspective."

The book Western Movies described Bravestarr: The Movie as a "fair sci-fi Western."

Randall Cyrenne reviewed the DVD release of Bravestarr: The Movie for the Animated Views website. Cyrenne praised the movie, saying "The drawings are pleasingly realistic and attractive. The characters each have distinct personalities with enough elasticity to offer up interesting personal exchanges and tell stories of emotional depth." He also called Bravestarr: The Movie "Filmation's greatest artistic triumph."
