= Biker Mice from Mars =

American animated television series

- Genre: Action-adventure; Comedy; Superhero
- Created by: Rick Ungar
- Developed by: Frank Ward; Dennis McCoy; Pamela Hickey; Mike Young
- Directed by: Tom Tataranowicz
- Voices of: Rob Paulsen; Dorian Harewood; Ian Ziering; W. Morgan Sheppard; Susan Silo; Brad Garrett; Leeza Miller McGee
- Composer: William Kevin Anderson
- Country of origin: United States
- Original language: English
- No. of seasons: 3
- No. of episodes: 65 (list of episodes)

Production
- Executive producers: Norman Singer; Rick Ungar; Tom Tataranowicz
- Producer: Tom Tataranowicz
- Production companies: Brentwood Television Funnies; Worldwide Sports & Entertainment, Inc.; Marvel Productions; New World Animation; Philippine Animation Studios

Original release
- Network: Syndication
- Release: September 19, 1993 – February 24, 1996

Related
- Biker Mice from Mars (2006 TV series)

Biker Mice from Mars is an American animated series created by Rick Ungar. The series premiered in syndication the week of September 19, 1993. It consists of three seasons of 65 episodes, with the final episode airing in syndication the week of February 24, 1996.

The show follows three anthropomorphic mice motorcyclists named Throttle, Modo, and Vinnie who escape a war on their home planet Mars before arriving to rebel on the Earth against the species that destroyed their homeland (the Plutarkians). The mice's signature weapons consist of a cestus and a laser pistol (Throttle), a bionic arm with built-in laser blaster (Modo), and flares (Vinnie). Despite the frequent battles, no blood is shown, and many villains are monsters, aliens, and robots.

Ownership of the initial Biker Mice TV series passed to Disney in 2001 when Disney acquired Fox Kids Worldwide, which also includes Marvel Productions.

== Plot ==
On the planet Mars, there existed a race of anthropomorphic mice who enjoyed motorsports and had a very similar culture and society to that of human beings. At some point in time they were all but wiped out by the Plutarkians, alien fish-like humanoids who plunder other planets' natural resources because they have wasted all of their own. Three survivors, Throttle, Modo, and Vinnie, manage to escape on a spaceship, but are shot down by a Plutarkian warship and crash-land on Earth in the city of Chicago. There they meet a charming female mechanic named Charlene "Charley" Davidson and discover that the Plutarkians have come to Earth to steal its natural resources.

The Biker Mice investigate the crumbling ghetto of the windy city and soon discover that Chicago's leading industrialist, Lawrence Limburger, is actually a Plutarkian who disguises himself as a human, plotting to ransack Earth's resources to send to his own dying planet. Limburger enlists two henchmen, mad scientist Dr. Karbunkle and the idiotic Greasepit, to help him steal Earth's natural resources and send them to Plutark with the help of some supervillains that they transport from another location in the galaxy. The Biker Mice become destined to stop Limburger's schemes. The most frequent sign of victory is destroying Limburger's tall tower, forcing him to constantly spend money and time to rebuild it by the next episode.

== Characters ==
=== Protagonists ===
"The Bros.", Throttle, Vinnie, Modo

- Throttle (voiced by Rob Paulsen) – The tan-furred leader-figure of the trio who sports a rattail and quiff. Throttle is the most logical and level-headed of the three. Throttle lost his sight in an incident on Mars that also caused the losses of Modo's right arm and the right side of Vinnie's face and was fitted with faulty bionic eyes while in captivity; as a result, he wears green sunglasses with field spec capabilities, and on his right hand he wears a powered glove called Nuke Knucks that was made by Harley. He also carries a holstered laser pistol and sports a leather biker vest, making him the only one of the trio to carry a conventional weapon or wear clothes instead of armor. His right bicep has a tattoo that resembles the series' logo, which also matches his bike, a black chopper.
- Modo (voiced by Dorian Harewood) – The gray-furred gentle giant of the trio who sports an eye patch and shoulder pads. Modo lost his right arm and left eye in the same incident that burned off the right side of Vinnie's face and caused Throttle to lose his sight. Karbunkle replaced his arm with a robotic replacement that has a built-in laser cannon and great strength, as part of Stilton's thwarted plans to create an army of bionic warriors. Though normally gentle-tempered and empathic, Modo is prone to fits of rage, particularly when he or his companions are referred to as 'rats'; when angry, his right eye flashes red. His bike, a blue cruiser, is the only one with a known name ("Li'l Hoss") and the only one with the most demonstrated AI capability, as he frequently speaks to it, and it is shown to drive itself and respond to his commands more often than the other two.
- Vinnie (voiced by Ian Ziering) – The white-furred thrill-seeker and self-proclaimed lady-killer among the trio, a classic example of an egomaniac (with an inferiority complex, especially during his early days as a freedom fighter). The right side of his face was burned off in the same incident where Throttle lost his sight and Modo lost his right arm; thus, he wears a flexible faceplate. Vinnie rides a red sport bike in contrast to the others' muscle bikes, and is the most active and skilled of the three, often volunteering for the most dangerous tasks, enjoying the rush and subsequent glory and bragging rights.

=== Supporting characters ===
- Charlene "Charley" Davidson (voiced by Leeza Miller-McGee)—Charley is a human mechanic who owns the Last Chance Garage in Chicago. She is a headstrong woman and is always ready to go into battle, though the Biker Mice try to keep her out of dangerous situations, never because they think she is incapable or weak, but because they could not bear for anything bad to happen to her.
- Rimfire (voiced by Brian Austin Green) – Modo's nephew who is overprotected by his peers on Mars because of his age, despite the fact that he, too, is clearly capable of what it takes to be a worthy Freedom Fighter.
- General Carbine (voiced by Leah Remini) – General Carbine is the de facto leader of the Freedom Fighters, a former Army officer who defected during the Plutarkian-Mars war. She and Throttle are lovers, but their relationship suffers complications owing to her position among the Freedom Fighters.
- Stoker (voiced by Peter Strauss) – The founding father of the Freedom Fighter movement on Mars, and as seen in Once Upon a Time on Mars, revealed that Mars was sold, beginning to have doubts over the fight; eventually he continues fighting as part of the rebellion. He plays a more crucial role in the 2006 revival, where he fights to protect his invention from the invading Catatonian Empire.
- Harley (voiced by Kath Soucie) – A mechanic/nurse among the Freedom Fighters. She was involved in a love triangle between Vinnie and Stoker until Vinnie's injuries moved her enough to make him the faceplate and cross-belts he wears. Hardly had they come to an understanding, she was abducted by Mace towards the end of the Freedom Fighters' insurrection. She returns as an antagonist in the 2006 series.
- Four-By (voiced by Michael Dorn) - Another good guy on the block and a friend to the Biker Mice who drives a monster truck.
- "Asphalt" Jack McCyber (voiced by Jason Priestley) - A computer expert and inventor who is an old friend of Charley. His inventions are always targeted by the Plutarkians.

=== Antagonists ===
- Lawrence Lactavius Limburger (voiced by W. Morgan Sheppard) – The main villain of the series and archenemy of the Biker Mice. Lawrence Limburger is a bloated alien from Plutark and has an odd fascination for Earth's criminal society of the 1930s. He is the head of Limburger Industries, the biggest industrial company in Chicago. Wearing a purple business suit and a rubber mask in order to look human at most times, he attempts to mine it and other parts of Earth for various resources, including random earth, dirt, rock, snow, metal, and oil, which he plans to send back to his own dying planet. He is highly resourceful and cunning, but always fails due to the Biker Mice's interventions. During the War of Liberation on Mars, Limburger was a low-ranked and bullied officer, taunted by both his superior Stilton and Karbunkle. Limburger managed to attain his present rank by using Stilton's absence during the Biker Mice's attack on the Plutarkian base to attain his present rank. Limburger reappears in the 2006 sequel series, initially as a bootlicker for the Pit Boss after the Catatonians came into view in a flashback and later as a co-conspirator alongside the Catatonians.
  - Dr. Benjamin Boris Zachary Karbunkle (voiced by Susan Silo) – A thin, sly mad scientist of an indeterminate humanoid species. Karbunkle used to work for Limburger's superior Dominic T. Stilton until Limburger bribed him to cross over. Karbunkle's main task is to think of machines and robots to either battle the Biker Mice, gather resources from Earth, or look up the villain of the week with his dimensional transporter. During the War of Liberation on Mars, he gave Modo his bionic arm and eye, Stoker his bionic tail, and Throttle his malfunctioning bionic eyes as part of his experiments to create a bionic army after they were captured by Plutarkian forces. He intended to use one of his inventions, the Mind Bender Beam, to brainwash them into being loyal to the Plutarkians; he was only able to brainwash Stoker before the Biker Mice escaped, and Stoker was later freed from Plutarkian control, while the Beam was destroyed. Karbunkle is a sycophant, often seen admiring Limburger and praising him; however, Karbunkle's top priority is Karbunkle. He is often seen torturing Fred the Mutant, cares little about his co-worker Greasepit, and has traded Plutarkian employers many times.
  - Greasepit (voiced by Brad Garrett) bungling sidekick usually in charge of whatever project Lawrence Limburger is running at the time. Greasepit rides a motorized tricycle into battle against the Biker Mice at the head of his goons and wears a pair of gardening trousers like a mechanic's. As his name suggests, Greasepit constantly oozes oil, and he is consistently clumsy, often falling over or dropping critical pieces of Limburger's schemes.
  - Fred the Mutant (voiced by Rob Paulsen) – A masochistic mutant working for Limburger. He thrills at the thought of receiving pain, and that is his one purpose as well, being the subject of many of Karbunkle's testings as well as physical abuse by Limburger. Fred has three eyes, a bushy tail, duck-like feet, and a tentacle in place of a right arm.
- Napoleon Brie (voiced by Luke Perry) – Limburger's unhinged chief Plutarkian rival from Detroit who is far more successful than Limburger in his efforts. He dominates Detroit. Despite this, Brie's attempts at taking out the Biker Mice turn out just as futile as Limburger's. Brie's efforts are not helped by his undermining Limburger at the same time. Small of stature and the owner of a large variety of facial masks, although he only ever wears the one with a crazy eye and speaks with an accent very similar to Elmer Fudd. Brie reappears in the 2006 series, where he and Limburger had a brief truce with the Catatonians.
  - Number One (voiced by Mark Hamill in the first appearance, Jeff Bennett in later appearances) - A gun for hire with a big red beard and sunglasses who works for Napoleon Brie.
- Plutarkians – The Plutarkians are fish-like aliens that either plan to obtain Earth's resources or conquer Earth. Each of them is named after a cheese. Besides Limburger and Brie, the Plutarkians consist of:
  - Lord Camembert (voiced by Jeff Bennett) – The Plutarkians' supreme ruler and Limburger's higher-up. In some other cases, he will appear with the entire Plutarkian council with Limburger in a panic over what task is current. He often appears on the vidcom or in person to Limburger and berates him for his failure.
  - Mudfish Murdock (voiced by Jeff Bennett)—A Plutarkian trucker who was hired by Limburger to kill the Biker Mice while he attempted to drain Lake Michigan and deliver it to Plutark.
  - Provolone (voiced by Jeff Bennett)—A Plutarkian lawyer.
  - Dominic T. Stilton (voiced by Malcolm McDowell) - A Plutarkian who was Limburger and Karbunkle's superior on Mars prior to the events of the series. Stilton hates Limburger for his scheming and repeated attempts to usurp him. Unlike other Plutarkians, Stilton is a neat freak who constantly carries around handkerchiefs to wipe dirt and grime off of himself and anything he touches.
  - Gerald Guyere (voiced by Jim Cummings) - A Plutarkian operating in New Orleans.
  - Jack Monteray (voiced by Jeff Bennett) - A Plutarkian operating in Las Vegas. He is often nicknamed "One-Eyed Jack".
  - Gutama Gouda (voiced by Jim Cummings) - A Plutarkian operating in Los Angeles.
  - Romana Parmesana (voiced by Tori Spelling in normal form, Jennie Garth as Angel Revson) - A Plutarkian operating in Cleveland. She used her disguise of Angel Revson to manipulate Jack McCyber in her plot to usurp Lawrence Limburger and Napoleon Brie.
- Pit Boss (voiced by Stu Rosen) – The Pit Boss is the burly ruler of the Pits outside of town. The Pit Boss has an electric whip that he uses to keep his slaves in line.
  - Pit Crew – The henchmen of Pit Boss who will come up and rob various places, often taken hostages as well.
- Road Ravens - A gang that was once used by Limburger to steal gasoline from different trucks.
  - Jimmy Mac (voiced by Jerry Houser) - The leader of the Road Ravens.
- Stalkers (voiced by Robert Ito and Brad Garrett respectively) - A group of alien bounty hunters.
- Mace (voiced by Jeff Bennett) – Mace is a nomadic rat who appears to be disguised as a mouse and into intervening with the mice and the Plutarkian war in secret and sometimes coming into conflict with Vinnie, but he escaped by grabbing Harley and teleporting to the Nomad Rat base.

==== Supervillains ====
- X-Terminator (voiced by Dorian Harewood impersonating Arnold Schwarzenegger) – A robotic bounty hunter who rides a customized combat motorcycle.
- Lectromag (voiced by Mark Hamill) – An electromagnetic supervillain who the Biker Mice often have a hard time defeating.
- Tunnel Rat (voiced by Rob Paulsen) – A rat-like villain who is an expert at driving any digging vehicle.
- The Loogie Brothers (voiced by Neil Ross and Jess Harnell) – Hacka and Honka Loogie are known as the "Scum of the Universe." They were summoned by Limburger to stink up Chicago, summoned to collaborate with Evil Eye Weevil in a motocross plot, and later summoned to take advantage of Chicago's garbage crisis.
- Evil Eye Weevil (voiced by Jess Harnell impersonating Elvis Presley) – An egotistical Martian villain and former stunt performer who can induce hostility in anyone. Limburger summoned him to break the Biker Mice apart. He claims to be Elvis Presley's alien brother and dresses like and has similar mannerisms to Presley. Evil Eye Weevil later collaborated with the Loogie Brothers in Limburger's motocross plot.
  - Pukes of Hazard (voiced by Jeff Bennett and Rob Paulsen) – The aides of Evil Eye Weevil.
- Corroder Cody (voiced by Charlie Adler) – An eyepatch-wearing villain of indeterminate human-shaped species who was hired by Limburger to purloin the oil refineries.
- Munsterella and Gorgonzola (voiced by Elinor Donahue and Eddie Barth) – A towering reptilian humanoid duo.
- Weathermeister (voiced by Russi Taylor) – A female villain of indeterminate human-shaped species and old friend of Karbunkle. She can control the weather by placing her weather stickers on a map.
- Pulverizer (voiced by Jeff Bennett) – A cyborg. He assisted Limburger into stealing a military weapon called the Annihilator.
- Stone Cutter (voiced by CCH Pounder) – A female jackhammer-wielding supervillain. Limburger enlisted her to help steal Mount Rushmore.
- Jet Blaster (voiced by Jeff Bennett) – A robotic villain with no legs who can fly unusual devices. He was hired by Limburger to cut Chicago from Earth so that he can send it to Plutark.
- Catscan (voiced by Jeff Bennett) – A cat-like villain with psychic powers that was used by Limburger in a plot to get the Last Chance garage condemned.
- Slobber the Mutt (voiced by W. Morgan Sheppard) - The leader of the hyena-like Sand Raiders on Mars.
- Billie Monnie (voiced by Susan Silo) – A bird-like bounty hunter. She was originally after Limburger for an unknown client until Limburger paid her to target the Biker Mice.
- Mechanic – A mute cyborg who can control mechanical devices.
- Cycletaurs - Creatures created by Karbunkle that are the result of him combining the DNA of the Biker Mice with the molecular structure of three motorcycles. In the episode "Diet of Worms", a Cycletaur was paired up with Gutama Gouda.
- Icebreaker (voiced by David Warner) – A supervillain who has powers over cold and heat.

== Episodes ==
| Season | Episodes | Originally released | |
| Season | Episodes | First released | Last released |
|---|---|---|---|
| 1 | 13 | September 19, 1993 | December 12, 1993 |
| 2 | 39 | September 20, 1994 | June 23, 1995 |
| 3 | 13 | September 23, 1995 | February 24, 1996 |

== Production ==
In 1991, Teenage Mutant Ninja Turtles stopped broadcasting in first-run syndication and instead produced new episodes for broadcast on CBS as merchandising sales for the franchise dropped to $200 million from $1 billion from 1991-1992. As merchandisers were desperate for a successor to the franchise to maintain momentum, then Marvel Productions President Rick Ungar responded to the demand for a new marketable franchise by creating Biker Mice from Mars and even tried to build up the franchise in a similar way to Teenage Mutant Ninja Turtles by debuting the characters in a comic book in the Summer of 1993 to build hype for the series' debut that Fall. According to Unger, the inspiration for the series came about while he, his family, and some friends were having lunch at a Jerry's Famous Deli in Studio City, Los Angeles when a group of motorcylcists rolled up and entered the restaurant capturing the attention of both children and adults. Unger was taken aback not only by the attention they received, but also how outdated his take on biker culture was as most of the riders in the group consisted primarily of yuppies and this led to Unger cultivating the concept that would become Biker Mice from Mars. Prior to the series' debut, promotional deals were secured with several companies for the production of merchandising tie-ins and even a video game adaptation beginning development for Nintendo and Sega consoles with the logic being to try and capture the popularity Teenage Mutant Ninja Turtles acquired over five years by accelerating it to five months. While Ungar openly acknowledged the similarities between Biker Mice from Mars and Teenage Mutant Ninja Turtles, he stated that while the Turtles were geared exclusively towards children, Biker Mice would be written more broadly with multi-layered writing that could appeal to both children and adults.

After supervising producer Tom Tataranowicz and his team had completed all 65 episodes of Biker Mice from Mars, Marvel had been impressed with the creativity and quality displayed and hired Tataranowicz to retool the second seasons of their struggling Fantastic Four and Iron Man. The series performed well in its broadcast and even managed to secure the position as number 1 syndicated series at various points in its run Best Film and Video corp.'s home video release of the pilot and first two episodes performed extreme well during its Christmas 1993 release with Best President Roy Winnick stating it was their fastest seller they had seen. A licensing deal was secured with toy manufacturer Galoob who agreed to provide financial backing to the series.

== Broadcast ==
The series has been aired from 1993 to 1996 in the United States on many first-run syndicated affiliates.

The series has been aired on the YTV/Fox Kids (English) and Le Canal Famille (French) channels in Canada.

In the United Kingdom from 1994 to 1997, the series was aired on Channel 4 and from 1998 to 1999 on its youth strand T4. CITV on ITV2 re-ran the series at 07.55 Monday to Friday for a 10-week strip from early September 2006. It was repeated on ITV2 at 08.25 Monday to Friday for 10 weeks from March 27, 2007.

The cartoon was broadcast in the Republic of Ireland on RTÉ Two on weekday afternoons from 11 September 1995 to 1996.

=== UK/US ===
- Channel 4 / T4 / The Big Breakfast (1994–1999)
- CITV on ITV2 (2006–2007)
- Nickelodeon (1995–1998)
- Fox Kids (1999) (US)
- El Rey Network (2019)

== Film adaptation ==
Rick Ungar stated during the series run, he had received offers from Hollywood producers about a possible live-action feature film adaptation for sometime in Summer 1995 to be produced by David Chan who had produced the live-action Teenage Mutant Ninja Turtles films.

== 2006 revival ==
The Biker Mice from Mars returned to television in 2006. The 2006 Biker Mice from Mars series is a continuation of the story, while giving more airtime to another character, General Stoker.

The new 28-episode series began airing in the United Kingdom on Toonattik on GMTV on August 26, 2006. However, due to production problems at the studio in the Philippines, the series was not finalized until late 2007, resulting in the launch in the United States and many other countries being delayed until 2008, as it still needed to be dubbed.

The series was largely influenced by the major toy line that was manufactured by Italian giant Giochi Preziosi in 2005. GP retained Pangea as developers of the toy line, working in tandem with creator and executive producer, Rick Ungar. Characters, vehicles, and weapons used in the series were first developed by Pangea and turned over to G7 Animation for integration into the series. The teams of Ungar, G7, and Pangea collaborated in order to maintain consistency between the intellectual property and the execution of the primary toy range, as the GP licensing monies were utilized to set in motion the series development.

== Reboot ==
On July 21, 2023, Ryan Reynolds announced that he and his company Maximum Effort were co-producing a reboot of the series with The Nacelle Company and Fubo.

The Biker Mice from Mars made a cameo appearance in the RoboForce: The Animated Series season 1 finale "Today Detroit, Tomorrow the World". Throttle was voiced by Ian Sherwood.

== Other media ==
=== Promotional events ===
In August 1994, the Biker Mice made an appearance as costumed performers at the Love Ride kick-off ceremony in Glendale, California, a motorcycle themed charity event for the benefit of Muscular Dystrophy Association.

=== Video games ===
An LCD game of same name was released for Tiger Electronic Game on 1993.

A Biker Mice from Mars video game was released by Konami for the Super NES in 1994. The PAL version features extensive advertisements for Snickers candy bars. A Biker Mice from Mars game was also planned for Sega Mega Drive but it was never released.

In 2006, another Biker Mice from Mars video game was released based on the 2006 revival in Finland, Australia and the United Kingdom for the Nintendo DS and PlayStation 2 platforms. The game did not receive any major positive ratings although it was a major sales success throughout Scandinavia.

In 2015, a Biker Mice from Mars mobile game was released by 9thImpact for iOS and Android devices through the App Store and Google Play Store. The game is divided into episodes, each with a different storyline which unfolds as the player completes the levels. Commenting on the new game, series creator Rick Ungar said that Biker Mice fans would enjoy the snappy banter, classic catchphrases and irreverent satire that they would expect from the series, in addition to the non-stop action.

=== Comic books ===
Marvel Comics published a three-issue series in the early 1990s. A fourth issue was solicited on the reader's page.

Marvel UK published its own series. The whole American series and portions of the British series were published in Germany (also by Marvel UK) in 7 magazine-sized issues from 1994 to 1995.

Oni Press has rebooted the comic series in July 2024 starting with Biker Mice from Mars #1."

== See also ==
- Stone Protectors
- Avenger Penguins (UK counterpart)
- Gargoyles
- Captain Simian & the Space Monkeys
- Bucky O'Hare
- Mighty Ducks
- The Likeaballs (UK counterpart)
- Mummies Alive!
- Road Rovers
- SWAT Kats: The Radical Squadron
- Wild West C.O.W.-Boys of Moo Mesa

== Reception ==
In Finland, the series has achieved a strong cult following. The Finnish dub of the series is particularly remembered for the characters' occasionally crude and suggestive way of speaking, which is not typical in cartoons aimed at young audiences. Some of the characters might also speak, for example, in Helsinki slang or other Finnish dialects. Additionally, the dialogues included references to public figures and phenomena that became well known during the airing period.
