= Mushroom Wars 2 =

2016 video game

- Developer: Zillion Whales
- Publisher: Zillion Whales
- Series: Mushroom Wars
- Engine: Unity
- Platforms: Android, iOS, tvOS, Microsoft Windows, Nintendo Switch, PlayStation 4, Xbox One
- Release: iOS, tvOS, Windows, Android: WW: October 13, 2016; Switch: WW: July 5, 2018
- Genre: Real-time strategy
- Mode: Multiplayer; single-player

Mushroom Wars 2 is a real-time strategy video game, developed and published by Zillion Whales. It is the sequel to Mushroom Wars, and was released on iOS, tvOS, Android and Microsoft Windows via Steam on October 13, 2016 and on Nintendo Switch on July 5, 2018. The game is also available on PlayStation 4 and Xbox One.

The game is set in a fictional woodland world, where armies of mushrooms face off in dynamic real-time strategy battles. The player picks one of the heroes, characters with unique abilities, to lead the mushroom armies and commands them to take control of the battlefield in a variety of multiplayer modes with leagues, ranked matches and award system or single-player campaigns with customizable difficulty settings.

Building upon the core Mushroom Wars gameplay, Mushrooms Wars 2 features four campaign episodes, one for each tribe of mushroom folk, and competitive multiplayer for up to four people with two-player cooperative mode.

== Gameplay ==
In Mushroom Wars 2, players command armies in dynamic short-session matches, capturing buildings of opponents, which requires strategic resource management, fast reflexes, and the ability to oversee up to thousands of units at once.

Mushroom Wars 2 features four episodes of story-driven campaign, 50 missions each. A plotless multiplayer mode with custom game option lets players try out new strategies with up to three friends in free-for-all or team-based matches. Skirmish mode also lets players fight against artificial intelligence opponents (computer-controlled).

Before the match, players choose one of several hero characters from four mushroom tribes: Shrooms - Rudo or Ayner, Proteus - Marty'O or Cree, Shii'Moris - Stella or Trini, Grims - Pahom or Ankh. Each character has different skills attributable to his specific tribe and applicable to a certain territory or certain buildings. Special abilities bar is filled by the souls of soldiers who die in battles, so the more player fights, the faster he can open one of four unique skills of his character.

There are three types of buildings: villages that produce units, towers that defend a certain radius of territory and forges that create weapons to make the army stronger. Villages can be upgraded three times - the higher the level of upgrade, the more units they fit in and produce troopers faster. Towers can also be upgraded three times, each time increasing their effective radius and rate of attacks. Forges cannot be upgraded. Buildings can be converted into buildings of other types and back.

Players expand their influence on the map by growing armies in the base villages they start from and by capturing neutral buildings or the ones of opponents. There are several winning conditions, different for each match: destroying all the opposing armies by capturing all the buildings on the map; capturing specific buildings faster than the opponents; being first to have the points counted down to zero. A player is defeated if all of his units are destroyed, it also takes capturing all of his buildings.

== Development ==
Concept of Mushroom Wars 2 was formalized in 2014, when some of the developers of the original Mushroom Wars joined developer Zillion Whales. As soon as the first playable prototype was created, the team started showcasing the game at various conferences, e.g. Comic Con in St. Petersburg, GDC in San Francisco, Gamescom in Cologne. The game is developed using Unity with custom C++ render-plugin.

== Reception ==
Reception

Aggregate score
Aggregator	Score
Metacritic	PC: 76/100; NS: 72/100

=== Awards ===
- Best Strategy Game at WNConf 2016
- Best in Show at VK Fest 2016
- Igromania Choice Award at VK Fest 2016
- Best Mobile Game Nominee at DevGamm
- One of the Best App Store Games of 2016, according to Apple
- Best Mobile Game at GTP Indie Cup 2017
- Best Multiplayer Game at Indie Prize, Casual Connect Asia 2017
