= Bratz: Super Babyz =

2008 video game

Bratz Super Babyz
- Cover art of Bratz: Super Babyz
- Developers: Creat Studios and AWE Productions
- Publishers: THQ and ValuSoft
- Platforms: Nintendo DS, Windows
- Release: February 26, 2008
- Genre: Action-adventure
- Modes: Single-player, Multiplayer

Bratz Super Babyz is a video game based on the 2007 movie of the same name, which is also based on the Bratz Babyz sub-line of the Bratz toy line. The game was developed by Creat Studios and AWE Productions and published by THQ and ValuSoft for Nintendo DS and Windows on February 26, 2008.

== Summary ==
The game follows the same plotline as the Bratz Super Babyz movie, which involves aliens landing on Earth at the Stylesville Adventure Planet. One of their alien devices, the Matter Exchanger, falls into the wrong hands and transforms the Babyz into superheroes. With their newfound superpowers, the Babyz use their abilities to help the citizens of Stylesville and battle the evil invading aliens.

Players assume the roles of the four Bratz Babyz characters, each possessing unique abilities. The game offers a variety of missions, including apprehending thieves, confronting bullies, and rescuing lost animals. Additionally, players can explore an amusement park featuring mini-games and unlockable content such as new outfits, accessories, and movie clips.

== Development ==
Ubisoft published Bratz games for the PlayStation and Game Boy Advance in 2003, but MGA terminated the license that year and moved it to THQ. This led to a licensing legal battle that resulted in Ubisoft being awarded a $13.2 million judgment. While various THQ 2005 and 2006 games sold 700,000 copies, none of the company's 2007 games would sell over 100,000 units.

== Reception ==
The game received negative reviews. IGN gave the game a 4.0/10 calling it "unengaging... shallow and dull". Common Sense Media felt the title gave misleading messages on how young girls should look. Gamezone thought the gameplay was simple enough and wouldn't frustrate the player. While Game Vortex did their Bratz reviews from the point of view of the target player, the reviewer still felt it was an "Insult to intelligence". JeuxVideo felt the player needed to have an understanding of the film it was based on to understand the plot.
