= Creat Studios =

American video game developer

Creat Studios, Inc.
- Type: Private
- Industry: Video games
- Founded: 1990; 36 years ago
- Defunct: 2013
- Headquarters: Canton, Massachusetts, US
- Key people: Vladimir Starzhevsky (CEO)
- Website: creatstudios.com

Creat Studios, Inc. was a video game developer based in Canton, Massachusetts with a development studio in Saint Petersburg, Russia.

== History ==
Creat Studios, Inc was founded in 1990.

Creat Studios ceased making games in 2012 to 2013. They then changed focus to designing websites. The company's last Russian website may have closed in 2021.

== Key persons ==
Vladimir Starzhevsky then served as the company's chief executive officer.

== Notable games ==
- RC Cars/Smash Cars (2002)
- American Chopper 2: Full Throttle (2005)
- Biker Mice from Mars (2006)
- Mahjong Tales: Ancient Wisdom (2007)
- Coded Arms: Contagion (2007)
- Aqua Teen Hunger Force Zombie Ninja Pro-Am (2007)
- Bratz: Super Babyz (2008)
- Insecticide (2008)
- Tony Hawk's Motion (2008)
- Cuboid (2009)
- Magic Orbz (2009)
- Digger HD (2009)
- Mushroom Wars (2009)
- Wakeboarding HD (2010)
- Mecho Wars (2012)
