= Magic Orbz =

2009 video game

- Developers: Creat Studios; HeroCraft
- Publishers: Creat Studios & TikGames; HeroCraft
- Engine: Havok, CreatEngine
- Platforms: PlayStation 3 (PSN), iOS
- Release: PSN; January 15, 2009 iOS; November 27, 2012
- Genre: Breakout clone
- Modes: Single player, multiplayer

Magic Orbz (previously named Magic Ball) is a game for the Sony PlayStation 3 video game console. It is based on the PC game, Magic Ball 3. The game was released in January 2009 and was followed by a few additional downloadable content packs. An iOS port was developed and published by HeroCraft in November 2012.

== Gameplay ==
Magic Orbz is a 3D Breakout style game with a stylised game design and physics simulation. The game's visual appearance follows two themes, Pirates and Knights. As in many similar games in this genre, random power-ups fall from pieces of the level that are broken up by the ball.

The initial release of the game contains 48 normal levels + 2 bonus levels, providing 13 trophies. The "Wicked Witches" expansion includes an additional 24 Witch themed levels, 1 bonus level and 5 more trophies. The "Winter Pack" was released in January 2010 features 25 new levels. One more Level pack is listed as "Coming Soon" in the in-game menu.

Magic Orbz features single player, competitive multiplayer and co-operative multiplayer modes. Multiplayer has both local and online gameplays available.

== Reception ==
Reception

Aggregate score
Aggregator	Score
Metacritic	(iOS) 76/100 (PS3) 66/100

Review scores
Publication	Score
Destructoid	(PS3) 8/10
Gamekult	(PS3) 6/10
GameSpot	(PS3) 6/10
Gamezebo	(iOS) 70/100
IGN	(PS3) 7.5/10
Jeuxvideo.com	(PS3) 15/20
MacLife	(iOS) 3/5
PlayStation Official Magazine – UK	(PS3) 5/10
Pocket Gamer	(iOS) 3/5
VideoGamer.com	(PS3) 7/10

The PlayStation 3 version received "average" reviews, while the iOS version received "generally favorable reviews", according to the review aggregation website Metacritic.
