= Digger (video game) =

1983 video game

- Developer: Windmill Software
- Publisher: Windmill Software
- Designer: Rob Sleath
- Platforms: IBM PC, IBM PCjr
- Release: 1983
- Genre: Maze
- Modes: Single-player, multiplayer

Game OST

Welcome screen of original 1983 IBM PC version of Digger

The start of a game

Digger is a maze game released by Canadian developer Windmill Software as a self-booting disk for IBM PC compatibles. It is similar to the 1982 arcade game Mr. Do! Digger was developed by Rob Sleath, the primary developer of Windmill games. In 1984, Digger was converted to run on IBM PCjr and IBM JX.

== Gameplay ==
Features of Digger are similar to those in the arcade games Mr. Do! and Dig Dug. The player is placed in an underground maze and can dig horizontal and vertical tunnels through it. At least one tunnel already exists at the start of play. At various points on the board are emeralds (usually in clusters) and bags of gold. Monsters (initially in the "nobbin" form) appear at the top-right corner. If earth is excavated from under a gold bag, then the bag will wobble for a few seconds and then drop; if it falls more than one row, it will break open after falling, releasing gold, which can be collected. Bags can be pushed left or right into vertical paths, with similar results. Falling bags will squash monsters, but they will also squash the digger. The digger has a weapon, which fires in a straight line, but takes several seconds to recharge (taking longer as the levels go higher).

Monsters sometimes change from the "nobbin" form to the "hobbin" form, more frequently on higher levels. Hobbins also have the power to excavate and can destroy emeralds and gold bags while doing so.

When a monster is killed, another will appear at the top-right corner of the screen, up to a maximal number, which depends on the level. Once all the monsters for the level have been created, a cherry appears in the top-right corner. If the digger collects this, bonus mode is entered, and for about fifteen seconds (which decreases as the game level gets higher) the digger is able to eat the monsters. Accordingly, the monsters now run away from the digger rather than towards it (similar to Pac-Man).

A level ends when all the emeralds are gone or all the monsters have been killed.

=== Scoring ===
The player scores 25 points for collecting an emerald, with a bonus of 250 if eight are collected in immediate succession. Killing a monster by shooting it or dropping a gold bag on it scores 250 points; in bonus mode, the player scores 200 points for eating the first monster, 400 for eating the second, and so on, doubling each time. Collecting gold earns 500 points, and entering bonus mode 1000. A new life is awarded at each multiple of 20000 points.

== Music ==
During normal game play "Popcorn" is used as background music. In bonus mode the Overture to Wilhelm Tell by Gioachino Rossini plays. If the player dies, a rendition of Frédéric Chopin's Piano Sonata No. 2 in B flat Minor (also known as The Funeral March) is played, accompanied with a picture of an RIP gravestone. Digger used a pulse-width modulation sound system, which was unusual and advanced for 1983.

== Reception ==
Creative Computing in 1984 said that Digger "combines the best aspects of Pac-Man and Dig-Dug". Praising its graphics and sound, the magazine concluded that "it never loses its luster even after hours of play. Digger strikes a rich vein in a mountain of games".

== Legacy ==
An enhanced remake titled Digger HD was developed by Creat Studios and released on October 1, 2009 for PlayStation 3.

Multiple unauthorized versions and fan-remakes have been released, most of which still have Digger in the name. In 1998, Rob Sleath released the game under GNU GPL and Andrew Jenner created a free-software of the game, Digger Remastered, by reverse engineering the original game. Jenner noted that technically, the copyright might be still owned by Windmill, but that company is no longer selling the product, which he considered abandonware. In 2000, Millennium Digger: The Artful Machine was released by Alawar Entertainment. It adds a reimagining of the game with new levels and graphics. Digger Mobile Edition runs on mobile phones (or small devices capable of running Java ME). Digger Classic is a port of Digger Remastered to Android.
