= Tom Tataranowicz =

American television director

- Born: Thomas Tataranowicz; Detroit, Michigan, U.S.
- Occupation(s): Animator, storyboard artist, television producer, television director
- Years active: 1981–present

Thomas Tataranowicz (/ˌtætərəˈnaʊwɪts/) is an American cartoon animator, storyboard artist, producer and director.

== Career ==
His first credit was He-Man and the Masters of the Universe. He then went onto Marvel Productions / New World Animation where he was the Studio Head, Creative Executive Producer and Head of Development and Production of all series. These include franchises such as Biker Mice from Mars, Iron Man, Fantastic Four, and The Incredible Hulk.

Since 1999, Tom has operated his own animation studio, Tom T. Animation, Inc. He later formed Gang of 7 Animation in 2001.

== Filmography ==
| Year | Title | Director | Producer | Writer | Other | Notes |
|---|---|---|---|---|---|---|
| 1978 | The Lord of the Rings | | | | Yes | Animator (uncredited) |
| 1982 | American Pop | | | | Yes | Animator |
| 1982 | The Gary Coleman Show | | | | Yes | Storyboard director |
| 1982 | Heidi's Song | | | | Yes | Assistant animator |
| 1982 | Hey Good Lookin' | | | | Yes | Animator |
| 1982–1984 | Pac-Man | | | | Yes | Story director |
| 1983–1985 | He-Man and the Masters of the Universe | | | | Yes | Storyboard artist (1983–1984), assistant storyboard supervisor (1985) |
| 1983 | Fire and Ice | | | | Yes | Animator |
| 1984 | Fat Albert and the Cosby Kids | | | | Yes | Storyboard artist |
| 1984–1986 | Heathcliff and the Catillac Cats | | | | Yes | Storyboard artist |
| 1985 | The Zoo Gang | | | | Yes | Storyboard artist |
| 1985–1987 | She-Ra: Princess of Power | Yes | | | Yes | Storyboard assistant supervisor (1985), director (1985–1986), storyboard artist (1986–1987) |
| 1986 | Ghostbusters | Yes | | | Yes | Director, storyboard artist |
| 1987 | BraveStarr | Yes | | Yes | Yes | Line producer |
| 1987 | Pinocchio and the Emperor of the Night | | | | Yes | Storyboard supervisor |
| 1988 | BraveStarr: The Movie | Yes | | | | |
| 1989–1990 | Garfield and Friends | Yes | | | | |
| 1990 | Attack of the Killer Tomatoes | | | | Yes | Storyboard director, animation director |
| 1990 | Kid 'n Play | | | | Yes | Animation director |
| 1990–1992 | Bobby's World | Yes | | | | |
| 1991 | Bucky O'Hare and the Toad Wars | | | | Yes | Animation director |
| 1991 | Little Shop | | Yes | | | |
| 1993 | Shelley Duvall's Bedtime Stories | | | | Yes | Sheet timer |
| 1993 | The Magic Paintbrush | Yes | Yes | | | |
| 1993–1996 | Biker Mice from Mars | Yes | Yes | Yes | Yes | Voice director, writer of episode 1 "Rock and Ride!" and episodes 63–65 "Once Upon a Time on Mars (Parts 1–3)", Director of episodes 1–28, 32–34, 39, 53, 55, 58, 60–61 and 63–65, producer of episodes 1–31, 33–35, 38–39, 45–46, 53, 58, 60, 62–65 |
| 1995–1996 | Iron Man Season 2 (Episodes 14–26) | | Yes | | Yes | Supervising producer, voice director of episode 22 "The Armor Wars, Part 2", episode 24 "Hulk Buster" and episodes 25–26 "Hands of the Mandarin, Parts 1–2", producer of episode 14 "The Beast Within" |
| 1995–1996 | Fantastic Four Season 2 (Episodes 14–26) | Yes | Yes | | Yes | Supervising producer, voice director of episode 15 "Inhumans Saga, Part 1: And the Wind Cries Medusa" and episode 17 "Inhumans Saga, Part 3: Beware the Hidden Land" |
| 1996–1997 | The Incredible Hulk Season 1 (Episodes 1–13) | Yes | Yes | | Yes | Supervising producer, voice director, director of episode 6 "Man to Man, Beast to Beast", episode 8 "Fantastic Fortitude", episode 10 "And the Wind Cries...Wendigo!" and episode 11 "Darkness and Light, Part 1" |
| 1997 | The Weird Al Show | | | | Yes | Voice director |
| 1998 | The Lionhearts | | | | Yes | Slugging director |
| 1998 | The Secret of NIMH 2: Timmy to the Rescue | | | | Yes | Slugging, sheet timer |
| 1998–1999 | RoboCop: Alpha Commando | Yes | | | Yes | Storyboard slugging, exposure sheet timing |
| 1999 | Roswell Conspiracies: Aliens, Myths and Legends | Yes | | | | |
| 2000 | Capertown Cops | | | | Yes | Timing director |
| 2000 | Milo's Bug Quest | | | | Yes | Voice director |
| 2000–2002 | X-Men: Evolution | | | | Yes | Animation timer |
| 2003 | Ozzy and Drix | | | | Yes | Animation timer |
| 2003 | The Night B4 Christmas | Yes | | | | |
| 2004 | Kangaroo Jack: G'Day U.S.A.! | | | | Yes | Animation timing director |
| 2004 | My Little Pony: Dancing in the Clouds | | | | Yes | Animation timer |
| 2004 | What's New, Scooby-Doo? | | | | Yes | Animation timing director |
| 2005 | Son of the Mask | | | | Yes | Animation producer |
| 2006 | Legend of the Dragon | Yes | Yes | | | |
| 2006 | Biker Mice from Mars | | Yes | | | Video game |
| 2006–2007 | Biker Mice from Mars | Yes | Yes | | Yes | Story editor, co-executive producer, voice director, supervising producer |
| 2007 | Come on Let's Go with the Archie Show! | | | | Yes | Research, art materials |
| 2007–2008 | Random! Cartoons | | Yes | | Yes | Voice director, supervising producer |
| 2012–2013 | NFL Rush Zone | | | | Yes | Sheet timer |
