= Bloxorz =

- Developer: DX Interactive
- Publisher: DX Interactive
- Designer: Damien Clarke
- Platform: Web browser
- Release: June 21, 2007
- Genre: Puzzle
- Mode: Single-player

Bloxorz is a 2007 Adobe Flash puzzle game, created by Australian developer Damien Clarke (also known as Roboman) of DX Interactive. It was released by DX Interactive on June 21, 2007. The player's objective is to solve consecutive puzzles involving moving a block until it falls into a hole.

The game received praise for its simple premise, challenging puzzles, visuals and sound.

== Gameplay ==
The player controls a 1 × 1 × 2 rectangular block using arrow keys. Their objective is to move it across a floating platform and ultimately make it fall through a square hole by reaching it while the block is standing upright. The block can move by either rolling on its side or tilting. If it is moved somewhere not fully supported by the platform, it falls off the edges and the level must be restarted.

The game consists of 33 individual levels of increasing difficulty. Over the course of the levels new elements are added, such as the "O" switches (which can be pressed by the block in any position) and the "X" switches (which can only be pressed when the block stands up on top of them), both of which can open and close trapdoors.

There are also buttons with a "( )" symbol, which split the block into two separate cubes and teleport them to different locations. They are controlled independently, as the player can change which one is selected by pressing Space. When they are placed next to each other, they fuse into the original block. They cannot activate "X" switches while split, nor can they fall into the square hole.

Moreover, orange tiles are more "fragile" than regular tiles and break if the block stands vertically on them.

Each level has its own password, which allows the player to return to it later.

Once the game is completed, the total number of moves taken, the total time, and the number of failures are displayed.

== Development and release ==
Before Bloxorz, Clarke had developed games such as JetSpeed, Silversphere and Missile Game 3D.

During development, he created the game's graphics, audio and puzzles. Clarke wrote the game's code in ActionScript.

It was released on June 21, 2007. According to Deadlime Games, the game was played by over 100 million players over the years.

On December 10, 2017, Miniclip and Deadlime released a Bloxorz remake. It added a winter-themed world alongside the original content, with a total of more than 50 levels across both worlds.

=== Preservation ===
Bloxorz was converted to HTML5 by Coolmath Games, in an effort to keep the game available for the website after Adobe Flash was discontinued.

As of October 21, 2026, the game is available to play on Miniclip.

== Critical reception ==
Rock Paper Shotgun's Jim Rossignol described Bloxorz as "loads of fun". He highlighted the unnerving soundtrack, as well as its "slightly misleading" geometry.

Londonist called the game their "favourite at the moment", while pointing out how the simple mechanics possessed hidden complexity, with levels that get more challenging as the player progresses. They also applauded the visuals and the sound effects. In June 2008, Mat Annal (Nitrome's managing director at the time) told Gamezebo that Bloxorz was "the game I saw that impressed me most" in 2007. He especially noted its uniqueness as a puzzle game.

Jay Bibby of Jay Is Games called Bloxorz both "a simple idea" and "beautifully executed". He welcomed the password-based saving system, while showing a preference for automatic progress saving. Wired noted that alternating between "rolling on your side" and "flipping end over end" made the game stand out, calling it a "Monolith of Fun". Felix's Azfarul Islam drew attention to the spatial awareness needed to play Bloxorz, while acknowledging luck could work as well. He also emphasized how addicting it could be, and recommended playing it with friends.

== Legacy ==
=== Speedrunning ===
Coolmath Games listed Bloxorz as one of its five favorite speedrunning games. They highlighted the challenge even for casual players and the separate levels (that allow for segmented training). When the article was published, on July 21, 2022, the record for the entire game on Speedrun.com was 10 minutes and 23 seconds.

=== Academic research ===
In 2014, a team led by the University of Illinois at Urbana-Champaign intended to test a possible connection between playing certain games and improvements in cognitive skills. For this purpose, they had participants play a selection of "training games" for 15 hours. A different set of games (including Bloxorz) was played before and after the training session, to assess whether the training had an impact on their performance. For the study, Damien Clarke created a modified version of the game. The results, according to the paper, did not demonstrate significant transfer gains on Bloxorz.

A 2015 study conducted by Utrecht University, in the Netherlands, explored the computational complexity of Bloxorz. By using a reduction from Nondeterministic Constraint Logic, it concluded that the problem of determining whether a level of arbitrary size containing switches and trapdoors is solvable is PSPACE-complete, even when the trapdoors are all initially closed or open.

In 2019, a paper was published by researchers affiliated with King Abdulaziz University, in Saudi Arabia, and Benha University, in Egypt. It discussed the comparative performance of the following algorithms for Bloxorz's first level: breadth-first search, depth-first search and A*. The study concluded that A* and breadth-first search were more suitable for the tested problem.

=== Inspirations ===
Bloxorz was reported by GameSpot’s Kevin VanOrd to have inspired Cuboid, a 2009 video game with similar mechanics. He described it as a "clone" and questioned the reason for paying for the same experience that Bloxorz offers for free. VanOrd did, however, acknowledge that Cuboid features more puzzles and some level designs are more intricate.
