= Dorian Harewood =

American actor (born 1950)

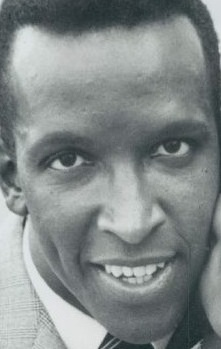
- Harewood in The Jesse Owens Story (1984)
- Born: August 6, 1950 (age 76); Dayton, Ohio, U.S.
- Education: University of Cincinnati (BFA)
- Occupation: Actor
- Years active: 1975–present
- Spouse: Nancy Harewood (m. 1979)
- Children: 2

Dorian Harewood (born August 6, 1950) is an American actor, best known for playing Jesse Owens in The Jesse Owens Story (1984), Det. Paul Strobber on Strike Force (1981–1982), and Rev. Morgan Hamilton in 7th Heaven (1996–2003).

== Early years ==
Harewood was born on August 6, 1950, in Dayton, Ohio, the son of Emerson Macaulay and Estelle Olivia Harewood. His father was a high school teacher and post office clerk. He graduated from the Conservatory of Music at the University of Cincinnati in 1972.

== Career ==
Harewood got his start in musical theater. On Broadway, he performed in Two Gentlemen of Verona, Streamers, and The Mighty Gents. For his role in Don't Call Back, Harewood received a Theatre World Award for Most Promising Actor. While in a stage production with Bette Davis, she encouraged Harewood to continue acting in dramatic roles, and credits her as his mentor. He made his film debut in Foster and Laurie (1975).

Harewood portrayed Simon Haley (father of author Alex Haley) in the ABC miniseries Roots: The Next Generations. He is known for starring as Jesse Owens in The Jesse Owens Story, and for his co-starring role as police psychologist Paul Strobber in the ABC Television series Strike Force (starring Robert Stack). He appeared regularly on Trauma Center alongside Wendie Malick and Lou Ferrigno, had a recurring role on China Beach and was Hank Mitchell in The Trials of Rosie O'Neill.

Some of his film work includes disaster film Gray Lady Down (1978), action drama Tank (1984), and sci-fi flick Solar Crisis (1990). In Against All Odds (1984), he appeared as a football player, and was Timothy Hutton's coworker in The Falcon and the Snowman (1985). Harewood then portrayed a combat Marine in Stanley Kubrick's Full Metal Jacket (1987). He appeared in two films in 2003: portraying Mackie Whitaker in Levity and Teddy Howard in Gothika.

In 1994, he was awarded the NAACP Image Award for Outstanding Actor in a Drama Series, Mini-Series or Television Movie, for his recurring role as jazz/blues saxophonist Clarence "Cool Papa" Charleston on the NBC drama series I'll Fly Away. The following year, Harewood voiced Hank Aaron in Hank Aaron: Chasing a Dream, narrating the television film. He earned an Emmy Award nomination for the special.

He also played Dr. Julian Wilkes in the NBC (later syndicated) TV series Viper, and had a recurring role as Rev. Morgan Hamilton in 7th Heaven. Harewood appeared as Eliot Pierce in the Showtime series The Hoop Life. For his work on this series, Harewood received his second NAACP Image Award nomination, for Outstanding Supporting Actor in a Drama Series in 2000. He has also dabbled in music, having sung the national anthem at the 1994 Orange Bowl and releasing an album, Love Will Stop Calling, in 1988.

As a voice actor, Harewood began playing characters in animation during the 1980s. He voiced A.C. in The California Raisin Show, a guest role as Dan Riley in Batman: The Animated Series, Tombstone in Spider-Man, and Michael Jordan in the Saturday morning cartoon ProStars. He later returned to the Batman franchise as Jim Tate in Batman Beyond. When James Avery was unavailable, Harewood would voice Shredder on Teenage Mutant Ninja Turtles. Harewood was the 2nd voice actor to portray Rhodey Rhodes / War Machine taking over James Avery in S2 completely in Iron Man and The Incredible Hulk. He provided the voice of Modo in Biker Mice from Mars (1993−96), a role which he reprised in the revival of the same name (2006−08).

Having appeared in over 100 productions in film and television, Harewood has only publicly expressed regret with one: the miniseries Beulah Land, where he portrayed an overseer named Floyd. He was disgusted with the film's script, and claimed he was "unhappy" and "embarrassed" with the finished production. Harewood has stated he will only accept roles he feels present positive images for African-Americans.

Harewood originated the role of Older Noah Calhoun in the Broadway adaptation of The Notebook, a role which he was nominated for the Tony award for Best Performance by an Actor in a Leading Role in a Musical.

== Personal life ==
Harewood married actress Nancy Ann McCurry on February 14, 1979. The couple have two children, Olivia Ruth and John Dorian.

== Filmography ==
=== Films ===
Year	Title	Role	Notes	Ref.
1976	Sparkle	Levi Brown	Feature film debut	
1978	Gray Lady Down	Lieutenant Fowler		
1981	Looker	Lieutenant Masters		
1984	Against All Odds	Tommy		
1984	Tank	Sergeant First Class Ed Tippet		
1985	The Falcon and the Snowman	Gene		
1987	Full Metal Jacket	"Eightball"		
1988	God Bless the Child	Calvin Reed		
1989	Kiss Shot	Kevin Marick		
1990	Pacific Heights	Dennis Reed		
1990	Solar Crisis	Borg		
1994	The Pagemaster	Jamaican Pirate (voice)		
1995	Sudden Death	Agent Matthew Hallmark		
1996	Space Jam	Monstar Bupkus (voice)		
1998	Evasive Action	Luke Sinclair		
2001	Glitter	Guy Richardson		
2003	Gothika	Teddy Howard		
2003	Levity	Mackie Whittaker		
2004	Kangaroo Jack: G'Day U.S.A.!	Lead Agent (voice)		
2005	Assault on Precinct 13	Deputy Gil		
2006	Adventures of Brer Rabbit	Mister Man (voice)		
2011	Mayor Cupcake	Albert Peach		

=== Television ===
Year	Title	Role	Notes	Ref.
1975	Cooley High		Unaired pilot	
1975	Foster and Laurie	Gregory Foster	Television film	
1975	Swiss Family Robinson	Jama	2 episodes	
1977	Kojak	Jake Riley	Episode: "The Condemned"	
1977	Family	Gil	Episode: "The Little Brother"	
1977	Eight is Enough	Richard Connery	Episode: "All's Fair in Love and War"	
1977	Columbo	Cop	Uncredited; episode: "Make Me a Perfect Murderer"	
1977	Panic in Echo Park	Dr. Michael Stoner	Television film	
1978	Siege	Simon	Television film	
1979	Roots: The Next Generations	Simon Haley	5 episodes	
1979	An American Christmas Carol	Matt Reeves	Television film	
1980	Beulah Land	Floyd	3 episodes	
1980	High Ice	Lt. Zack Dawkins	Television film	
1981–1982	Strike Force	Det. Sgt. Paul Strobber	20 episodes	
1982	The Ambush Murders	Ray Ellsworth	Television film	
1982	I, Desire	Det. Jerry Van Ness	Television film	
1983	Matt Houston	Jerry "The Rock" Lennox	Episode: "The Rock and the Hard Place"	
1983	Trauma Center	Dr. Nate "Skate" Baylor	13 episodes	
1984	The Jesse Owens Story	Jesse Owens	Television film	
1984–1985	Glitter	Earl Tobin	12 episodes	
1985	Hotel	Matthew Bowers	Episode: "Passports"	
1986	Murder, She Wrote	Sheriff Claudell Cox	Episode: "Powder Keg"	
1987	Amerika	Jeffrey Wyman	6 episodes	
1987	Guilty of Innocence: The Lenell Geter Story	Lenell Geter	Television film	
1987–1996	Teenage Mutant Ninja Turtles	Shredder (voice)	4 episodes	
1987	Beauty and the Beast	Jason Walker	Episode: "Terrible Savior"	
1988	Matlock	Edward Kramer	2 episodes	
1988	A Pup Named Scooby-Doo	Police Chief (voice)	Episode: "The Sludge Monster from Earth's Core"	
1989	Polly	Dr. Shannon	Television film	
1989–1990	China Beach	Major Otis	3 episodes	
1990	Polly: Comin' Home!	Dr. Shannon	Television film	
1990–1992	The Trials of Rosie O'Neill	Hank Mitchell	26 episodes	
1991–1994	The Legend of Prince Valiant	Sir Bryant (voice)	65 episodes	
1992	I'll Fly Away	Clarence "Cool Papa" Charleston	4 episodes	
1992	Batman: The Animated Series	Dan Riley (voice)	Episode: "The Forgotten"	
1992	Goof Troop	Buster Vessel (voice)	Episode: "Big City Blues"	
1992	Capitol Critters	Moze (voice)	7 episodes	
1993	Animaniacs	Spike Lee (voice)	Episode: "Taming of the Screwy"	
1993–1996	Biker Mice from Mars	Modo (voice)		
1996–1997	Spider-Man: The Animated Series	Lonnie Lincoln / Tombstone (voice)	4 episodes	
1994	Dr. Quinn, Medicine Woman	Carver	Episode: "Buffalo Soldier"	
1994	Viper	Dr. Julian Wilkes	Television film	
1994–1996	Iron Man	James Rhodes / War Machine (ep. 6-26), Whirlwind (ep. 10–26), Blacklash (1995–1996), Stilt-Man (voice)	16 episodes	
1994–1996	Gargoyles	Boreas, Talos, Little Anton (voice)		
1994–1998	Aaahh!!! Real Monsters	Kriggle		
1995–1997	Freakazoid!	Lt. Artie King, Deep-Voiced Singer (voice)	5 episodes	
1996–2003	7th Heaven	Rev. Morgan Hamilton	Recurring role; 10 episodes	
1996	The Incredible Hulk	Rhodey Rhodes / War Machine (voice)	Episode: "Helping Hands, Iron Fist"	
1996–1997	Superman: The Animated Series	Ron Troupe (voice)	2 episodes	
1996–1997	The Real Adventures of Jonny Quest	Tigari, Guard, Officer (voice)	2 episodes	
1996	Mortal Kombat: Defenders of the Realm	Jax (voice)	13 episodes	
1997	12 Angry Men	Juror #5	Television film	
1997	The Blues Brothers: The Animated Series	Don Kling	Episode: "Strange Death of Betty Smythe"	
1997	Pinky and the Brain	Bojangles (voice)	Episode: "Mice Don't Dance"	
1998–2001	Histeria!	Various voices	11 episodes	
1998	The New Batman Adventures	Judge (voice)	Episode: "Critters"	
1999–2000	Batman Beyond	Jim Tate (voice)	2 episodes	
2000	The Last Debate	Brad Lily	Television film	
2001–2003	Rescue Heroes	Bob Buoy (voice)	4 episodes	
2002	Earth: Final Conflict	Prosecutor Herman Forester	S5/Ep19 "Subversion"	
2002	Stargate SG-1	Counselor Thoran	2 episodes	
2002	The Practice	Dr. Jerry Cochran	Episode: "Evil/Doers"	
2002	The Christmas Shoes	Dalton Gregory	Television film	
2002–2003	Boomtown	Capt. Ronald Hicks	Recurring role; 7 episodes	
2004	Astro Boy	Dr. Tenma, Shadow (voice)	English dub	
2004	Megas XLR	Ender, Guardian, Squadron Leader (voice)	2 episodes	
2004	Static Shock	Warden (voice)	Episode: "Future Shock"	
2006–2009	Biker Mice from Mars	Various voices		
2006–2012	Handy Manny	Coach Johnson (voice)	4 episodes	
2007	Billy & Mandy's Big Boogey Adventure	Older Irwin (voice)	Television film	
2007	Private Practice	Duncan Stinson	Episode: "In Which Sam Receives an Unexpected Visitor..."	
2007–2009	House of Payne	Larry Shelton	4 episodes	
2007–2008	The Batman	Martian Manhunter (voice)	4 episodes	
2007–2008	The Land Before Time	Mr. Thicknose (voice)	6 episodes	
2007	The Grim Adventures of Billy & Mandy	Van Helsing, Burrito, News Reporter (voice)	2 episodes	
2007	Legion of Super Heroes	Mar Londo (voice)	Episode: "Cry Wolf"	
2008	Terminator: The Sarah Connor Chronicles	Boyd Sherman	3 episodes	
2008	The Spectacular Spider-Man	Nicholas Bromwell (voice)	4 episodes	
2020	Criminal Minds	Fred Kirman	Episode: "Spector Slowing"	
2021	9-1-1	Rupert	Episode: "Defend in Place"	
2022	Bel-Air	Judge Robertson	2 episodes	
2022	Big Sky	Roman Cobb	Episode: "Come Get Me"	
2025	The Equalizer	General Franklin Knight	Episode: "A Few Good Women"	

=== Theatre ===
Year	Title	Role	Venue	Ref.
1975	Don't Call Back	Clarence	Helen Hayes Theatre, Broadway	
1976	Streamers	Carlyle	Mitzi E. Newhouse Theatre, Broadway	
1978	The Mighty Gents	Frankie	Ambassador Theatre, Broadway	
2024	The Notebook	Older Noah	Gerald Schoenfeld Theatre, Broadway	

=== Video games ===
Year	Title	Role	Ref.
1993	Gabriel Knight: Sins of the Fathers	Toussaint Gervais	
2004	Astro Boy	Dr. Tenma, Magnamite	
2004	X-Men Legends	Shadow King	
2004	Onimusha 3: Demon Siege	Spirit of Onimusha	
2006	Lost Planet: Extreme Condition	Gale	
2012	Diablo III	Barbarian (Male)	
2013	Metal Gear Rising: Revengeance	N'mani	

== Awards and nominations ==
Year	Association	Category	Project	Result	Ref.
1975	Theatre World Award		Don't Call Back	Won	
1994	NAACP Image Award	Outstanding Lead Actor in a Drama or Limited Series	I'll Fly Away	Won	
2000	NAACP Image Award	Outstanding Supporting Actor in a Drama Series	The Hoop Life	Nominated	
1995	Primetime Emmy Award	Outstanding Informational Special	Hank Aaron: Chasing the Dream	Nominated	
2024	Tony Award	Best Actor in a Musical	The Notebook	Nominated	
2024	Drama Desk Award	Outstanding Featured Performance in a Musical	The Notebook	Nominated	
2024	Drama League Award	Distinguished Performance	The Notebook	Nominated	

== Discography ==
- "Show Me (One More Time)" (recorded in the 1980s)
- Love Will Stop Calling (1988) (Emeric Records/Ichiban Records/EMI)
- Have A Little (2001) (USA Music Group)
