= Wakeboarding HD =

2010 video game

- Developers: Creat Studios; TikGames
- Publisher: Creat Studios
- Platform: PlayStation 3
- Release: PAL: March 18, 2010; NA: March 25, 2010
- Genre: Sports
- Modes: Single-player, multiplayer

Wakeboarding HD is a 2010 sports video game developed and published by Creat Studios exclusively for the PlayStation 3.

== Reception ==
Reception

Aggregate score
Aggregator	Score
Metacritic	63/100

Review score
Publication	Score
IGN	5/10

Wakeboarding HD received "mixed or average" reviews, according to review aggregator Metacritic.
