= The Jesse Owens Story =

1984 television film

- Genre: Biography; Drama; History
- Written by: Harold Gast
- Directed by: Richard Irving
- Starring: Dorian Harewood; Dan Ammerman; Bob Banks; Tom Bosley; Georg Stanford Brown; LeVar Burton
- Theme music composer: Michel Legrand
- Country of origin: United States
- Original language: English

Production
- Executive producer: Harve Bennett
- Producer: Harold Gast
- Production locations: Columbus, Ohio; Dallas, Texas
- Cinematography: Charles Correll
- Editors: Richard Bracken; Robert F. Shugrue
- Running time: 174 min.
- Production companies: Harve Bennett Productions; Paramount Television Domestic Distribution

Original release
- Network: Syndication
- Release: July 9 – July 10, 1984

The Jesse Owens Story is a 1984 American two-part, four-hour made-for-television biographical film about the black athlete Jesse Owens. Dorian Harewood plays the Olympic gold-winning athlete. The drama won a 1985 Primetime Emmy Award and was nominated for two more. It originally premiered in syndication on July 9 and 10, 1984 as part of Operation Prime Time's syndicated programming.

== Plot summary ==
The plot is largely shown in flashback from the perspective of a black reporter (Lew Gilbert) interviewing both Owens and his coach to get an insight into his life. This is mainly in the context of the press investigating his prosecution for tax evasion. A suspicious sum of $10,000 was apparently paid to Owens in a political campaign. However, whether or not he paid tax his intentions are clearly honorable: buying his parents a $6,000 house and buying his coach a new car.

Owens is spotted at high school but no scholarship exists for athletics. It is organized to get him into college (and thereby the college athletic team) by giving his father a caretaker job at the Ohio State University. Owens starts breaking all records immediately. However, he constantly has to combat segregation laws.

At the 1936 Summer Olympics in Nazi Germany, all the athletes love him as he offers them free advice as to how to enhance their performance. Despite Nazi indoctrination, even the German athletes like him as he laughs off the bigotry.

Owens debunks the myth that Adolf Hitler snubbed him, as Hitler only shook hands on the first day, so all winners thereafter were "snubbed".

On the long jump, the German umpires claim to foul jumps. On the third and final jump, his German competitor advises him to jump on a mark a foot before the white line. This he does and still breaks the record causing the whole crowd to stand.

The film plays little mention of the winning 100m run. More issue is made of the 200m but in particular, the relay: Coach Lawson Robertson enters the locker room and tells the all white but somewhat Jewish relay team (including Marty Glickman and Sam Stoller) that they are being replaced by Owens, Ralph Metcalfe and Mack Robinson. The Americans win by 15 yards in a world record performance and they ask Metcalfe to take the gold medal for the team.

In the long jump (the main focus of the plot here), Owens and his German friend Luz Long, vie jump for jump each increasing slightly with each jump. Long jumps 25' 9.5" on his third and last jump. Owens jumps 26' 5.5" - a superhuman feat which stood for 25 years. Long takes his hand and holds it high.

Owens takes four golds home. Long takes the silver. We are told that Long later joined the army in the Second World War and was killed by American troops.

In the tax evasion story, Owens tells his family he has been found guilty and faces 4 years in prison.

He comes into continual confrontation with Avery Brundage, who effectively removes him from the team going to Stockholm and wants to maintain a clean reputation to all athletes.

Abe Saperstein explains how Owens inspired the creation of the Harlem Globetrotters.

Owens gets several ticker tape parades, but his various product endorsements come to nothing. The only project which comes to fruition is his very brief appearance in the film Charlie Chan at the Olympics. He spends some time on the road with Bill Robinson in his Mr. Bojangles show. His wife encourages him to go back to college and aim at coaching athletics. He does this and is named Assistant Trainer at Ohio State University. The university officials debate that they perhaps exploited Owens and despite his academic shortfalls, they should let him graduate. Instead, they expel him.

In August 1951, Jesse arrives at the same Berlin stadium where he found fame to play with the Harlem Globetrotters in front of 75,000 - the largest basketball crowd ever - who have mainly come to see Owens.

However, he remains popular on the lecture circuit, as an inspirational man. Two thirds of his talks are free, to youth groups and the like. His wife scolds him for lending money to numerous individuals who ask him for help.

He meets with Jimmy Hoffa to try to get more black truck drivers and cab drivers in Chicago. He is very hesitant about this but speaks to Hoffa's men in a speech. The authorities get wind of this. The Governor asks him to resign as secretary of the Illinois Youth Commission.

In the run up to the 1968 Olympics, a committee ask Avery Brundage to be fired for racism. Brundage only takes no action: banning South Africa from the Games. Only two black men took part in the Olympics but Tommie Smith won gold. He gave the black power salute on the podium and Jesse Owens is sent to talk to the team afterwards. He says they are racist in their own right and disgraced their country. The black community dislike his links to the white world (as they see it) and start to label him as an Uncle Tom.

Owens explains to his wife and daughters how the world is very different then (in the 1960s) than how it was in the 1930s. He explains he was grateful for whatever happened as his expectations were low.

Finally, Owens explains to the reporter that he wanted the government to get mad with him. Keep your head down and keep out of trouble: a black man living in a white world. He does not wish to be controversial, but looking at his tax return, his emotions rose and he said "screw them".

Owens sits alone in a courtroom before the others arrive. He asks his lawyer not to appeal any prison sentence. At the trial, the prosecution asks for 4 years in prison. His defense asks that his charity be brought into account. The judge outlines the purpose of tax. The judge sees the evasion as willful.

However, he wants to look at "the credit side" of his life. He has helped many good causes and helped the community. He calls Owens a "humanitarian", and fines him $3,000. Owens thanks the judge, and the audience starts to clap.

In the final scene, while leaving court with his wife, he notices a crook breaking into his car. He races after him and catches him. The thief says "Oh my god, you're Jesse Owens." He takes the crook for a walk and talks about taking a new path.

He is given an honorary doctorate by Ohio State University. His scholarships help many under-privileged kids, which helped persons such as Carl Lewis. They list the numerous charities which he helped.

== Cast ==
- Dorian Harewood as Jesse Owens
- George Kennedy as Charley Riley, the coach who helps Owens from the outset
- Kai Wulff as Luz Long
- Dan Ammerman as Coach Lawson Robertson
- Bob Banks as Henry Owens
- Tom Bosley as Jimmy Hoffa
- Georg Stanford Brown as Lew Gilbert
- LeVar Burton as Professor Preston
- Bernard Canepari as Attorney Grossfeld
- Robert Chidsey as Governor Aide
- Glenn Colerider as OSU Professor Overman
- Barry Corbin as Judge
- Ronny Cox as Coach Larry Snyder
- Chris Douridas as Jerome
- George Dunham as Paul Innuh
- Norman Fell as Marty Forkins
- Lynn Hamilton as Mamma Solomon
- Robert Hibbard as Police Lieutenant
- Chuck Long as Terry Carter
- Gary Moody as Angry Customer
- Randy Moore as Coach Cromwell
- Debbi Morgan as Ruth Solomon Owens
- Greg Morris as Mel Walker
- Tonye Patano as Laverne Owens
- Lee Ritchey as Brashears
- James Sikking as Avery Brundage
- Vic Tayback as Abe Saperstein
- Craig Miller as Klaus, German Hurdler

== See also ==
- Race (2016 film)
- List of films about the sport of athletics
