= Biker Mice from Mars (1994 video game) =

Biker Mice From Mars
- North American cover art by Steve Feicht
- Developer: Konami
- Publisher: Konami
- Director: Satoshi Kishiwada
- Producer: Kuniaki Kinoshita
- Designer: Shinya Inoue
- Programmers: Toshinori Shimono; Mitsuaki Ogawa; Hideki Kataoka; Satoshi Kishiwada
- Artists: Takeshi Fujimoto; Tae Yabu; Yasuji Terada; Tomohiro Morisawa
- Composers: Hideto Inoue; Nobuyuki Akena
- Platform: Super NES
- Release: NA: December 1994; EU: January 1995
- Genre: Racing
- Modes: Single-player, multiplayer (Note: Up to 2 players.)

Biker Mice From Mars is a racing video game released by Konami for the Super Nintendo Entertainment System. It is a tie-in to the animated series of the same title. The PAL version of the game features in-game product placement for Snickers candy bars.

== Gameplay ==
The player takes on the role of one of six racers in a series of contests on different tracks that are displayed in isometric projection. After each lap, the player's weapon is refilled and a random item can be used to get additional cash, invulnerability, nitrous oxide acceleration, or delay the opponents by triggering an earthquake or time stop. The winner gets the prize money. The player must maintain an overall rank within the top three of a round in order to advance to the next one.

In-between contests, upgrades for engine, tires, armor and weapons can be purchased from the Last Chance garage using the money earned.

== Reception ==
Reception

Review scores
Publication	Score
Computer and Video Games	68/100
Next Generation	3/5
Nintendo Life	7/10
Nintendo Power	13.7/20
Official Nintendo Magazine	86/100
Total!	65/100
VideoGames & Computer Entertainment	8/10
Games World	74/100
Super Gamer	90/100

In their review, GamePro summarized that "Konami included all the elements of a fun racing game in this cart: good game play, cool characters, easy control, and variety." They also praised the colorful backgrounds and sound effects, though they criticized the lack of digitized voice.

Next Generation reviewed the SNES version of the game, rating it three stars out of five, and stated that "overall, it's inexpensive, different and fun."
