= Cuboid (video game) =

2009 video game

- Developer: Creat Studios
- Publishers: TikGames, Creat Studios, I-Free
- Platforms: PlayStation 3, iOS
- Release: January 8, 2009
- Genre: Puzzle
- Modes: Single-player, multiplayer

Cuboid is a video game developed by Creat Studios and released on January 8, 2009, for the PlayStation Network on PlayStation 3.

== Gameplay ==
In this puzzle game, players move a block twice as tall as it is wide along a puzzling path, trying to push it to and fit it into the exit. The block can only be rotated 90 degrees at a time in one of four directions, and due to the size of the block, when the block is face up the block can only be moved two units at a time on the grid of platforms, and can only be moved one unit at a time otherwise. If the block is moved off the platforms, the player fails the level and must restart the puzzle from the beginning. There are platforms that can break if the block is made to stand upright on them, which will cause the block to fall off as well.

Levels also contain elements that must be interacted with to progress, such as switches, teleporters, and the aforenoted wooden platforms. Switches on certain levels need to be activated to progress through the level, which may reveal or disable platforms, and some of them require the block to stand upright on them to activate. There are also powerups, including one that splits the block into two, and one that allows the player to take a few more movements on levels with a limited amount of movements before the level is failed.

== Reception ==
Reception

Aggregate score
| Aggregator | Score |
|---|---|
| Metacritic | 79/100 |

Review scores
| Publication | Score |
|---|---|
| Destructoid | 7/10 |
| Eurogamer | 8/10 |
| GameSpot | 6/10 |
| IGN | 9/10 |

Cuboid received a score of 79/100 on Metacritic based on 13 reviews, indicating "generally favorable" reviews.

Cuboid was included in IGN's Top 10 PlayStation Network games. IGN reviewer Sam Bishop stated that the game is a great value for its $10 cost, and its initial appeal is in its simplicity. GameSpot reviewer Kevin VanOrd compared Cuboid to Bloxorz, an older free Adobe Flash game, instead stating that the value of Cuboid is low compared to Bloxorz and other $10 PlayStation Network games.

== iOS release ==
Creat Studios and I-Free published Cuboid for iPad, iPhone and iPod touch in App Store on May 17, 2012.
