= Biker Mice from Mars (2006 TV series) =

- U.S. Promotional Poster
- Genre: Action-adventure; Science fiction Superhero
- Created by: Rick Ungar
- Developed by: Rick Ungar; Tom Tataranowicz
- Written by: Sean Catherine Derek; Tom Tataranowicz
- Starring: Clancy Brown; Dorian Harewood; Jess Harnell; Rob Paulsen; Dina Sherman; Jim Ward; Lisa Zane; Ian Ziering
- Theme music composer: William Kevin Anderson
- Country of origin: United States
- Original language: English
- No. of seasons: 1
- No. of episodes: 28

Production
- Executive producers: Tom Tataranowicz; Rick Ungar; Ted Bather; Michael Loveland
- Running time: 30 minutes
- Production companies: Brentwood Television Funnies; Philippine Animation Studio; Criterion Licensing; Storyland Group

Original release
- Network: GMTV; 4Kids TV (Fox); Italia 1; CITV Channel (2006–2007)
- Release: August 26, 2006 – December 27, 2008

Related
- Biker Mice from Mars

Biker Mice from Mars is an American animated series, a revival and continuation of the show with the same name which aired from 1993 to 1996. One season of 28 episodes was produced. It ran from 2006–2009.

Jim Ward won a 2009 voice-actor Daytime Emmy for his performance as Eyemore in the episode "Manchurian Charley" and as the Crusher in the episode "Here Come the Judge". The series aired on the 4Kids TV block on FOX in the fall of 2008. In the UK, the series was picked up for a second window by CSC Media Group, who scheduled it to air on April 2, 2010, on the Kix channel.

== Plot ==
Taking place a few years after the events of the original series, the Biker Mice return to Earth. In this series, the lead antagonists are the evil Catatonians, a race of cat-like creatures who desire the greatest prize on Mars and the Regenerator while also having been rivals of the Plutarkians. In the process of obtaining it, they destroy it leaving the Biker Mice (including Stoker – see below) to flee to Earth to build a new one.

== Characters ==
=== Returning characters ===
- The Biker Mice (Modo voiced by Dorian Harewood, Throttle voiced by Rob Paulsen, Vinnie voiced by Ian Ziering) - The Mice themselves are, character-wise, almost the same as before, except that now they have been properly formed into a special commando squad; as such, Throttle's leadership role has been formally recognized with the rank of Commander. There have also been minor changes in costume: Throttle has new sunglasses and a solitary green shoulder belt similar to Vinnie's under a new, shorter vest and his one powered glove has been replaced with twin powered gloves that also act as laser blasters, Modo has new boots and a cutting torch in his mechanical arm, Vinnie carries powered shuriken and powered gloves identical to Throttle's, and all three have new helmets.
- Charlene "Charley" Davidson (voiced by Lisa Zane) - Charley sports a new, short haircut and a more contemporary outfit suited to motorcycling rather than mechanics. Although not present in every episode, she appears in the majority and plays a more prominent role than in the original series. Her relationship with Vinnie has been toned down for the new series, but (in true absence-makes-the-heart-grow-fonder fashion) Charley appears to reciprocate Vinnie's feelings towards her more readily than in the original series.
- Carbine (voiced by Dina Sherman) - Carbine, revealed to be Stoker's niece, has gained a slight costume change and plays a substantially more prominent role than originally, even appearing on Earth several times. Her (strained) relationship with Throttle still exists, emphasizing the strain of the War and their relative military responsibilities.
- Stoker (voiced by Peter Strauss in 2006, Jim Ward from 2006–2008) - The founder (and leader) of the Freedom Fighter movement, in the new series he has been missing in action for several years and is wrongly held to have turned traitor. He is the inventor of the Regenerator, a matter-conversion device crucial to produce the water needed for the survival of the Martian population. Some years earlier, he had been forced to build a second Regenerator for Ronaldo Rump. When the Martian Regenerator is accidentally destroyed, the Biker Mice are dispatched to Earth to recover Rump's machine. Stoker's alter-ego is Nightshift, a black-clad masked biker. The disguise was originally adopted when he was still regarded as a traitor, but is now used to protect him from sunlight, which (because of overexposure to radioactive tetra-hydrocarbons, the power source of the Regenerator) causes him to temporarily mutate into a wererat. Stoker is returned to normal by combining the Regenerator with Catatonian fur.
- Rimfire (voiced by Jess Harnell) - Modo's nephew, briefly selected as Throttle's replacement when Throttle is promoted to one-star general and to be reassigned to Mars. Carbine decided to rescind Throttle's promotion after seeing that Rimfire still wasn't up to spec as a "Biker Mice," even after a year's training for such a placement.
- Lawrence Lactavious Limburger (voiced by W. Morgan Sheppard) - A Plutarkian who returns for revenge on the Biker Mice after years of being a (literal) bootlicker for the Pit Boss.
  - Dr. Karbunkle (voiced by Susan Silo) - A humanoid alien mad scientist that worked for Limburger and has also spent years of being a bootlicker for the Pit Boss.
  - Greasepit (voiced by Jess Harnell) - A greasy criminal who is one of Limburger's minions.
- Pit Boss (voiced by Jess Harnell) - The ruler of the Pits beneath the Rump Mini-Mart.
- Napoleon Brie (voiced by Luke Perry) - A Plutarkian and rival of Lawrence Limburger.
- Lord Camembert (voiced by Jess Harnell) - The ruler of the Plutarkians.
- Harley (voiced by Jennifer Hale) - Harley is Vinnie's former sweetheart. Before the Biker Mice went to Earth, Harley was kidnapped by a rat named Mace, got half her face blown off, and then was shown mercy by other rats. Therefore, she turned on her own people and aided the rats in their fight. Since then, she has come to hate the Biker Mice because she feels that they gave up on her, although this was not the case as Vinnie in particular had searched extensively. However, near-cataclysmic eruptions that threaten to doom Mars snap Harley back to reality, driving her to sacrifice herself to save Mars.

=== New characters ===
- Spitfire (voiced by Dina Sherman) - The long-lost daughter of Stoker.
- Catatonians - The Catatonians are cat-like aliens that seek to claim the Regenerator. The three-part episode "Once Upon a Time on Earth" revealed that they were rivals of the Plutarkians.
  - Hannibal T. Hairball (voiced by Rob Paulsen) - The Assistant Supreme Commander of the Catatonian Army who is very short and incompetent. Hairball escapes the Regenerator purge of the Catatonians, and alongside Dr. Catorkian joins up with the Nomad Rats.
  - Cataclysm (voiced by Clancy Brown in most episodes, understudied by Dorian Harewood in "Biker Mice Down Under" and "Once Upon a Time on Earth" Pt. 1) - While officially the second-in-command to his younger brother Hannibal, it is Cataclysm who really calls the shots in the Catatonian quest for the Regenerator.
  - Dr. Phineas P. Catorkian (voiced by Jess Harnell impersonating Boris Karloff) - A very tall and thin Catatonian mad scientist who is the force behind most of the inventions that Hannibal and Cataclysm use against the Biker Mice. Catorkian escapes the Regenerator purge of the Catatonians at the end of the series and alongside Hairball joins up with the Nomad Rats.
  - Catalina Catacall (voiced by Martha Madison) - A female Catatonian shapeshifter.
- Ronaldo Rump (voiced by Jess Harnell) - A parody of Donald Trump and Ricky Ricardo, with an oversized butt, a large Toupée and a pencil mustache. Rump used to be a used car salesman who came across Stoker and the Regenerators in his possession. He uses a Regenerator to make himself more wealthy, but it is running out of power and he is trying to force Stoker to build a new one.

== Episodes ==
No.	Title	Directed by	Written by	Original release date
1	"The Adventure Begins: Part 1"	Tom Tataranowicz	Rick Ungar	August 26, 2006
Mars is running out of water, and soon the Martian mice will perish. Their only hope is the Regenerator, a machine capable of converting dirt into any substance required (including water). But the evil Catatonians, led by Supreme Commander Hairball, have launched an attack in hope of capturing the Regenerator for their own purposes. Will the Biker Mice from Mars be able to hold out against the Catatonian assault?
2	"The Adventure Begins: Part 2"	Tom Tataranowicz	Glenn Leopold; Rick Ungar	August 27, 2006
With the only Regenerator destroyed, things are looking bad for Mars. The Biker Mice must take General Stoker (creator of the Regenerator) to Planet Earth where he can find the necessary tetra-hydrocarbons required to build another machine. But there is a surprise in store for the Biker Mice on their return to Chicago in the form of developer Ronaldo Rump, who has joined forces with the Catatonians to obtain a Regenerator (the ultimate land-development tool).
3	"Changes"	Tom Tataranowicz	Mark Seidenberg	August 28, 2006
General Stoker's exposure to tetra-hydrocarbons has worsened his condition, turning him into the mad "Stoker Rat". He is loose in New York City, where Rump has captured him ito force Stoker to build another Regenerator for Rump so he can become richer. Will Stoker turn traitor? Can the Biker Mice rescue him from the clutches of Ronaldo Rump and get him back to work in the effort to save Mars?
4	"Rumpity-Dumpster"	Tom Tataranowicz	Christy Marx; Randy Littlejohn	September 2, 2006
Due to a freak accident Ronaldo Rump is wandering the streets of Chicago without memory (or hairpiece), holding onto the Regenerator. Of course this news makes its way to both the Catatonians and the Biker Mice, who are both chasing Ronaldo.
5	"The Tender Mouse Trap"	Rich Arons	Matt Wayne	September 9, 2006
The Biker Mice turn their motorcycles into radical Swamp Cycles when they discover a mouse damsel-in-distress stuck in the mud. Is this attractive mouse really what she appears to be—or could she be the Catatonian shape-shifter, Catalina Catacall, on a secret mission to trick the Biker Mice into revealing Stoker's secret lab where he is building a new Regenerator for Mars?
6	"It's the Pits"	Tom Tataranowicz	Tom Sito	September 16, 2006
The Biker Mice are lured into a secret underground world carefully hidden beneath a Rump Mini-mart where they encounter not only one of the nastiest baddies of all time in the form of the Pit Boss, but an unexpected group of enemies they have not seen for a long time....Lawrence Limburger and Dr. Karbunkle!
7	"The British Invasion"	Tom Tataranowicz	Rick Ungar	September 23, 2006
Things heat up for the Biker Mice when the infamous Sir Richard Brand-Something arrives with hopes of winning a Regenerator for his own purposes. Joining forces with Supreme Commander Hairball, Sir Richard puts his plans (and his evil robots Bangers and Mash) into action—giving the Biker Mice a ride for their money. In the meantime, General Stoker is finding that the Earth's tetra-hydrocarbons are producing some unexpected (and unwanted) side effects.
8	"Break Up"	Tom Tataranowicz	Rick Ungar	September 30, 2006
Throttle is promoted, and must return to Mars with Carbine; his replacement, Rimfire (Modo's nephew), does not fill his shoes very well, forcing Carbine to rescind Throttle's promotion.
9	"Here Come the Judge!"	Rich Arons	Rick Ungar	October 7, 2006
The Biker Mice are arrested and tried before... Judge Ronaldo Rump, which leads to their bikes being impounded.
10	"Desperado"	Tom Sito	Rick Ungar	October 28, 2006
Throttle is a victim of mistaken identity; an injury leaves him thinking he is a character out of a famous Christmas movie, which leads him to be captured by Doctor Catorkian.
11	"Surfer Cats from Saturn"	Tom Tataranowicz	Steven Darancette	November 4, 2006
The Biker Mice get their hands on Rump's Regenerator in time to be accidentally transported to Saturn, thanks to Hairball's clumsy control of a transporter machine. With no way off the ringed planet, the mice turn to a race of local hip cats. However, they discover that these wave-riding kitties are descendants of the Catatonians (sworn enemies of the Mice). Will the slick, surfing cats of Saturn turn out to be friend or foe?
12	"Manchurian Charley"	Rich Arons	John McCann	November 11, 2006
The Biker Mice are challenged to a motocross race, where they encounter some serious foul play. As usual Charley uses her mechanical skills to keep the bikes on track, but strange things keep happening. Could it be that Charley is the mechanic behind the mayhem?
13	"Biker Mice Down Under"	Rich Arons	Sean Roche	November 25, 2006
Rump hires the felonious Flare to create a landslide inside Stoker's cave-bound laboratory, leaving General Stoker trapped inside and his research vulnerable to discovery. It is up to the Biker Mice to don spelunking gear and rev up their cave-cycles to save the General and his work before Rump and the Catatonians can get their paws on him.
14	"Driver's Ed"	Tom Sito	S : Elizabeth Lee, Vivian Chen; T : John McCann	December 16, 2006
The Biker Mice are reduced to the Minivan Mice from Mars when their motorcycles are stolen by Ronaldo Rump and his evil minions. Just one problem—while they may be the universe's best bikers, nobody ever taught them how to drive a car!
15	"New Cats in Town"	Tom Tataranowicz	Steve Cuden	December 23, 2006
The high commander of the Catatonians has had enough of Hairball and Cataclysm's failure to acquire a Regenerator on Planet Earth, and sends them to the bench. In their place three wily, female Catatonian shape-shifters led by Catalina Catacall are sent to give the Biker Mice a race for the prize!
16	"First Mice on the Moon"	Tom Tataranowicz	Steve Cuden	February 24, 2007
The Mice discover a race of small rabbits living on the moon, and realize they have new allies who despise the Catatonians as much as they do.
17	"Cyber Mice from Mars"	Rich Arons	Steven Darancette	April 20, 2007
When Stoker discovers Rump has planted a super-virus into his secret computer data banks which contain the secrets of the Regenerator he transports himself into the World Wide Web, intent on killing the virus. But time is running out for Stoker; it is up to the Biker Mice to take out the cyber-threat before they are deleted permanently!
18	"Between Rump and a Hard Race"	Tom Tataranowicz	Jeremy Anderson	July 14, 2007
Ronaldo Rump launches his Regenerator into orbit over the Arctic Nature Preserve, planning to turn acres of natural wilderness into Rump Amusement Park! It is up to the Biker Mice to foil Rump's evil plot and preserve this important animal habitat, while taking on the world's top motocross racer on a track designed to keep the best bikers in the world struggling to stay aboard!
19	"Bringing Up Vinnie"	Tom Tataranowicz	Glenn Leopold	July 14, 2007
Things turn a little wacky for the Biker Mice when Vinnie is accidentally turned into a baby mouse by Dr. Catorkian. If you thought keeping Vinnie under control was a problem before, watch as the Biker Mice attempt to battle the Catatonians and Ronald Rump while struggling to keep Vinnie in clean diapers!
20	"Once Upon a Time on Earth: Part 1"	Tom Tataranowicz	S : Rich Arons, Lee Cohen, Steven Darancette, Tom Tataranowicz; S/T : Tom Sito	2007
Stoker finishes his new Regenerator and the Biker Mice are ready to take it back to Mars. Unfortunately, Stoker himself has other plans for it even when an unlikely enemy of the Biker Mice poses as a government agent to collect the aliens hiding out on Earth.
21	"Once Upon a Time on Earth: Part 2"	Tom Tataranowicz	S : Rich Arons, Steven Darancette, Tom Sito, Tom Tataranowicz; S/T : Lee Cohen	2007
The Biker Mice are trapped in Detroit. Their old archenemies Limburger and Napoleon Brie are planning to conquer Chicago with the Regenerator and the aliens in their custody. In addition, our heroes have other things to worry about: Has Stoker switched sides? Meanwhile Charley and Carbine are searching for the Biker Mice, but they meet an unknown mouse from Stoker's past....his daughter Spitfire.
22	"Once Upon a Time on Earth: Part 3"	Tom Tataranowicz	S : Rich Arons, Lee Cohen, Tom Sito, Tom Tataranowicz; S/T : Steven Darancette	December 7, 2007
The Biker Mice have big problems: Stoker has been kidnapped by Rump and the Catatonians who have used the Regenerator to turn Limburger and Brie into fish while Carbunkle collaborates with Dr. Catorkian. Rump himself wants to conquer Earth by replacing world leaders with Greasepit and the aliens that Limburger apprehended while Dr. Carbunkle and Dr. Catorkian work to modify the Regenerator. Can the Biker Mice save Stoker and the Earth before it's too late?
23	"Vigilante Vengeance"	Tom Tataranowicz	Sean Roche	September 6, 2008
Ronaldo Rump starts a TV show where ordinary citizens can hunt people and bring them in for a reward. This leads to a million-dollar bounty on the Biker Mice's heads, and they have all Chicago after their tails.
24	"A Hairy A-Bomb"	Tom Tataranowicz	Lee Cohen	November 15, 2008
The Biker Mice discover they are not the only ones searching for tetra-hydrocarbons when they encounter an educated, soft-spoken Abominable Snowman-type creature named "A-Bomb"(voiced by Patrick Warburton). But will there be enough to save A-Bomb's family and give the Mice what they need to finish the Regenerator?
25	"Carbine's Conundrum"	Tom Tataranowicz	Rich Arons	November 22, 2008
The Catatonian shape-shifter, Catalina Catacall, infiltrates Freedom Fighter Headquarters on Mars and captures Carbine. Catalina's objective? To download Biker Mice computer files and get her claws on Carbine's new secret weapon: the Surgerator, a device boosting the Regenerator's power ten thousandfold. However, Carbine is not so easily fooled or defeated and it becomes a showdown between these two enemies with the future of Mars at stake!
26	"Swimming with Sharks"	Tom Tataranowicz	Rick Ungar	December 27, 2008
Vinnie's crazy space pirate aunt Mago comes to Earth intending to steal its water to sell on Mars.
27	"Cat and Mouse"	Tom Tataranowicz	Rich Arons	2007
Hairball hypnotizes Throttle to reveal all the secrets about Stoker and the Regenerator. Fortunately, Throttle isn't as easily hypnotizable as Hairball thought he would be.
28	"Turf Wars"	Tom Tataranowicz	Tom Tataranowicz	July 26, 2007
The Mice finally find Harley only to realize she hates them because she wrongly assumed they gave up on her. The entire episode is done in the style of a rock opera.

== Production and broadcast ==
In 2005, Rick Ungar, who created the original Biker Mice from Mars, through his company Brentwood Television Funnies had partnered with Philippine animation studio PASI and Criterion Licensing a new Biker Mice from Mars series planned for 26 episodes. Character designs for the new series were provided by comic book artist Bernie Wrightson. Dorian Harewood, Rob Paulsen, and Ian Ziering reprised their roles from the original series voicing the Biker Mice Modo, Throttle, and Vinnie respectively. As the original show was a massive success in European markets such as France and Italy, this prompted an Italian toy manufacturer and the United Kingdom based Criterion Licensing to approach Unger about reviving the series which Unger was happy to do and even brought back supervising producer Tom Tataranowicz from the original series to oversee the new one.

Pre-production was started in May 2005 with United Kingdom broadcaster GMTV signed on.

Biker Mice from Mars aired in the United Kingdom and Ireland, and Finland, in 2006. It aired in the United States on Fox 4Kids TV block, beginning on August 9, 2008. Italia 1 began broadcasting the show in late 2008 with Mediaset doing a large merchandising campaign to support the show.

=== Broadcast UK history ===
- CITV (August 26, 2006 – July 26, 2007)

=== Broadcast FI history ===
- MTV3, C More Juniori, Fox

== Home media ==
As of 2011, four volumes of Biker Mice from Mars DVDs are available in the UK through Abbey Home Media. Two volumes were released in Australia and New Zealand by Madman Entertainment. Volume one was released in Bulgaria on October 17, 2008. Eight volumes have been released, but some have repeated episodes.

== Merchandise ==
The series was largely influenced by the major toy line that was manufactured by Italian toy giant, Giochi Preziosi in 2005. Giochi Preziosi (GP) was selected as worldwide toy licensee and retained Pangea as developers of the toy line, working in tandem with creator and executive producer, Rick Ungar. Characters, vehicles, and weapons used in the series were first developed by Pangea then turned over to G7 Animation for integration into the series. The team of Ungar, G7, and Pangea collaborated in order to maintain consistency between the intellectual property and the execution of the primary toy range, as the GP licensing monies were utilized to set in motion the series development.

Home entertainment, merchandise, publishing and promotions agency for the series was Sharpe Company.

In 2006, a Biker Mice from Mars video game, based on the 2006 revival, was released in Finland, Australia and the United Kingdom, for the Nintendo DS and Sony PS2 consoles. While the game itself did not receive major positive ratings, it sold successfully throughout Scandinavia, where game performed well, placing number 2 in Finland and in the top 10 in other Scandinavian, Northern European, and African territories.
