= Love Ride =

American and Swiss charity event (1985–2015)

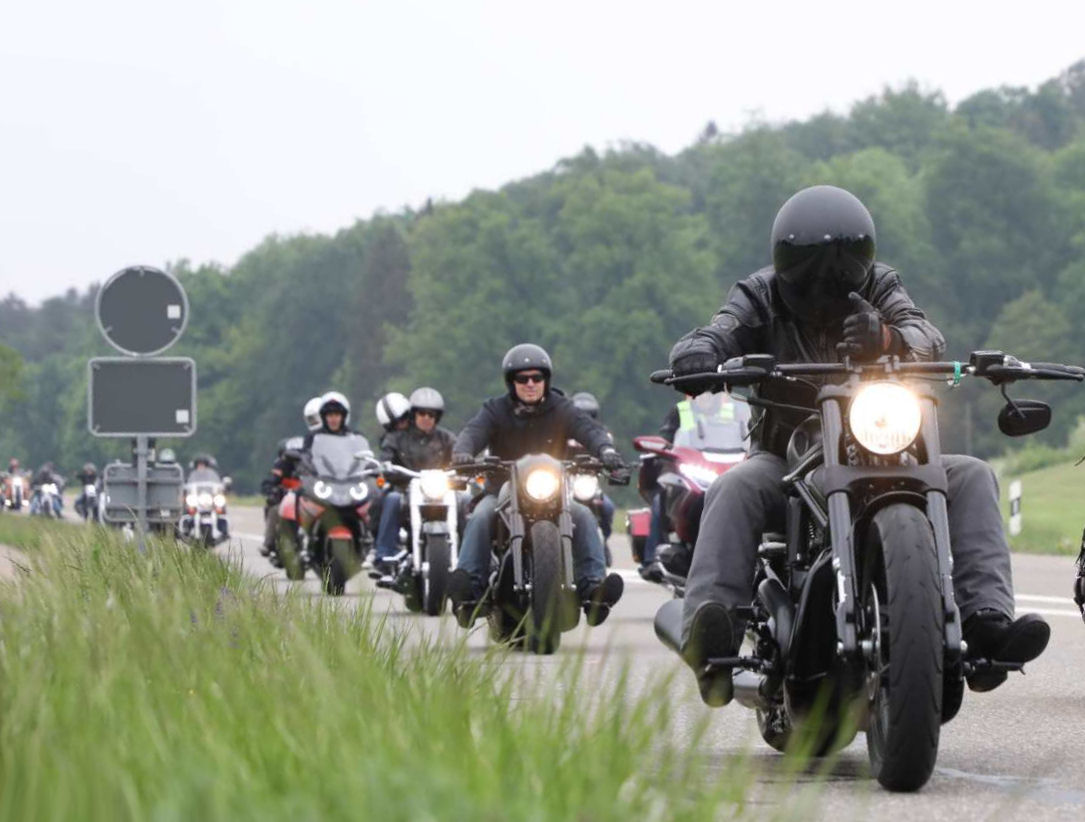
Swiss Love Ride 2018

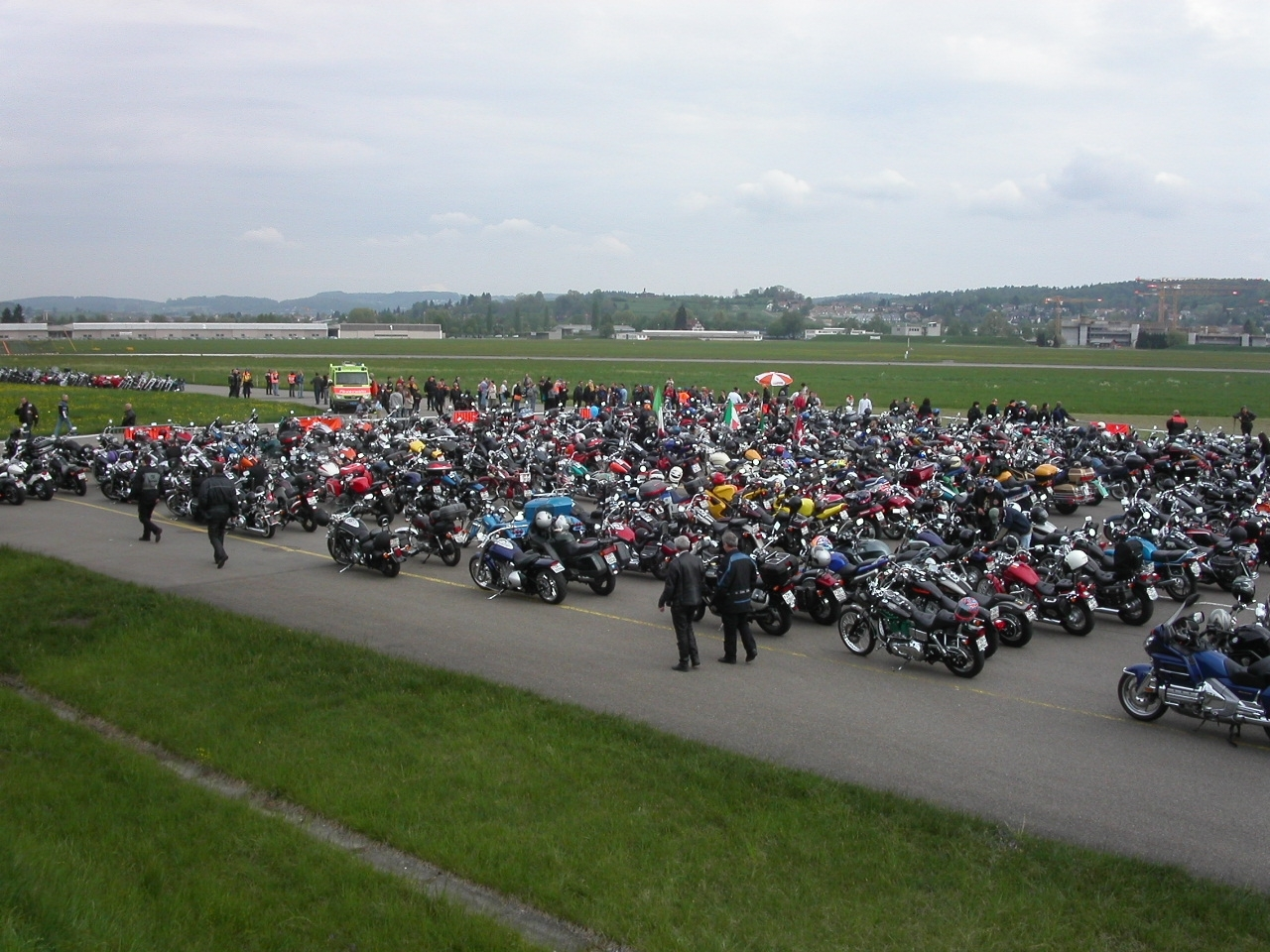
Love Ride Switzerland 2004, Zürich

The Love Ride was a charity motorcycle ride held annually in Southern California and in Switzerland. Its organizers bill it as "The Largest One-Day Motorcycle Fund-Raising Event in the World".

The American Love Ride was active between 1985 and 2015, but Swiss Love Ride persists.

== Harley-Davidson of Glendale, California ==
The Love Ride was founded by Oliver Shokouh, the owner of a Harley-Davidson dealership in Glendale, California. Comedian and motorcycle buff Jay Leno served as grand marshal every year since 1985. Other celebrity participants have included Lorenzo Lamas and Larry Hagman, Robert Patrick, and musicians Lynyrd Skynyrd. The original ride in 1984 raised $1,500. In 2004, the ride raised over one million dollars.

The 2009 Love Ride was cancelled due to poor ticket sales and problems with sponsors, both attributed in part to the recession that began in 2008.

The final US Love Ride happened in 2015. Organizers said they had raised a total of more than $24 million in previous rides, and hoped to use the final event to top $25 million.

== Love Ride Schweiz ==
In 1993, Erwin W. Wyrsch along with 5 others brought the idea of a motorcycle charity event, inspired by the American Love Ride, to Switzerland. On May 1st, 200 people on 99 motorcycles raised 7,500 Swiss francs in donations for the Swiss Muscular Dystrophy Association.

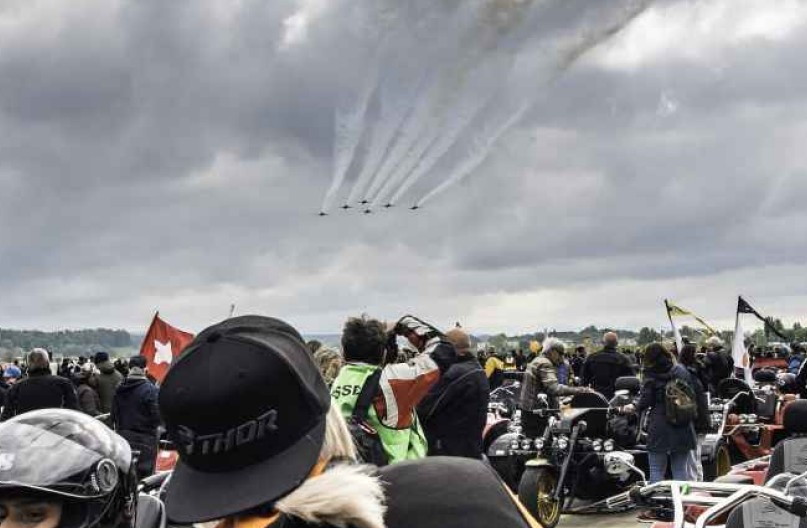
Love Ride Patrouille Suisse

In the meantime, Love Ride Switzerland has become the largest one-day charity motorcycle event in the World. Over 7,000 motorcycles and around 20,000 visitors are expected each year. The proceeds for the foundation more than $8 million dollar.

The event take place at the military airfield near Zurich. The Highlights besides the ride out are a popular motorcycle stunt show and the Patrouille Suisse. Switzerland's elite fighter jet squadron, which is also part of the event. The event is very popular among many fans and is supported and attended by many prominent visitors. Regular guests include, for example, Susanne Klee, Peter Sauber (F1 team boss), the band Gotthard, Michel von Tell, Freddy Nock, Marco "Büxi" Büchel, and Grisu Grizzly.

Since the 2000s, this event has been moderated by Jeanette Macchi-Meier.
