= Biker Mice from Mars (2006 video game) =

Biker Mice From Mars
- European PlayStation 2 cover art
- Developers: Creat Studios (PS2); Full Fat (NDS)
- Publisher: The Game Factory
- Platforms: PlayStation 2, Nintendo DS
- Release: PlayStation 2: EU: November 17, 2006; NA: June 5, 2007; Nintendo DS: EU: February 9, 2007; NA: June 5, 2007
- Genre: Racing
- Mode: Single-player

Biker Mice from Mars is the second video game released under the same title. It is based on the 2006 revival in Finland, Australia, United Kingdom and United States; developed by Creat Studio for the PlayStation 2, and British company Full Fat for the Nintendo DS; published by The Game Factory; and first released in Europe in 2006 and 2007.

== Plot ==
On Mars, a battle wages on between the race of mice, known as the Martian Freedom Fighters, and the invading Catatonian Empire. Both sides are fighting for the rights of one important machine: the Regenerator. This machine has the ability to terraform Mars, creating a safehaven for all mice. The Catatonians wish to claim it so they can take over the planet. Freedom Fighter General Stoker is the only one who knows how to build the Regenerator. As a result, he is not present on the battlefield, but is instead on Earth looking for molecules vital to the device's construction.

The mice later mysteriously lose contact with Stoker, so another general, Carbine, sends the Biker Mice from Mars. After their arrival, they land in Chicago and meet up with Charley Davidson, who runs and owns the Last Chance Garage, which becomes the Biker Mice's base of operations. Not long afterwards do they realize the Catatonians, led by General Hairball and Cataclysm, have come to Earth in search of Stoker, so that they can ensure their claim of the Regenerator. Evil billionaire Ronaldo Rump (a parody of Donald Trump and Ricky Ricardo with an oversized butt) also seeks Stoker, since he owns a Regenerator of his own, and uses it for his evil money-making schemes, but it is running low on power.

Throughout the course of the game, the player takes on the role of either Throttle, Vinnie and Modo, and maneuvers in and out of boss battles and other such levels.

== Reception ==
Reception

Aggregate score
Aggregator	Score
Metacritic	27/100 (PS2)

Review scores
Publication	Score
Eurogamer	1/10 (PS2)
IGN	3/10 (PS2 & DS)
