= Lyta Alexander =

- Babylon 5 character
- First appearance: Babylon 5: The Gathering; 1993
- Last appearance: Babylon 5: The Road Home
- Portrayed by: Patricia Tallman
- Voiced by: Patricia Tallman

In-universe information
- Species: Human
- Affiliation: Psi Corps; Vorlons; Telepath Underground Railroad
- Origin: Earth

Lyta Alexander [Lyta pronounced as: (/lit/ LEE-tah)] is a fictional character portrayed by Patricia Tallman in the science fiction television series Babylon 5.

== Role in Babylon 5 ==
=== Character arc ===
In the series' pilot, Lyta is described as a sixth generation telepath, but she points out that telepathy may have been running undetected in her family even earlier since telepaths were not monitored before that generation. In the series, it is stated that Lyta was trained by the Psi Corps and that she briefly interned with the Psi Cops division. After an incident while accompanying Alfred Bester, she transfers to commercial work. In 2257, she is assigned as Babylon 5's first commercial telepath. Soon after she arrives at the station, she scans Vorlon Ambassador Kosh, in violation of the wishes of the Vorlon government, in order to try to discover the identity of his attacker.

In season 2, Lyta's experience with the Vorlon ambassador permanently changes her, but many of the characters are being altered, including Babylon 5's commander. Lyta, the telepath, is recalled from her assignment a few weeks later and is questioned regarding her encounter with Kosh. She gets interrogated for months by the Psi Corps, she eventually escapes and joins the Mars Resistance. While underground, she uncovers information regarding a mole among the Babylon 5 command staff. She returns to the station in late 2259, where she reveals Talia Winters as an unwitting mole for secret forces in EarthGov and Psi Corps.

In season 3, Lyta travels to the Vorlon homeworld, one of the few known humans to do so and live. There, she gets modified by the Vorlons and is given gill-like implants to allow her to breathe in a Vorlon environment and the ability to "carry" a Vorlon consciousness. This tremendously increases her telepathic and psychokinetic powers beyond what she herself can realize. She returns to Babylon 5 as an aide to Ambassador Kosh.

In season 4, Lyta is key to the eventual resolution of the Shadow War on Coriana 6, serving as the vessel through which Sheridan and Delenn confront the elder races and forces them to leave the galaxy. Immediately after the Shadow War, she becomes part of the expedition to the Shadows' homeworld of Z'ha'dum. Using unknown abilities and implanted instructions from the Vorlons, she triggers the destruction of the planet to spite Alfred Bester and prevents Shadow technology from falling into the wrong hands. However, after the conclusion of the Shadow War, she finds herself unwelcome and having difficulty finding employment. She goes on to play a decisive role in the endgame of the Earth Civil War, triggering the shadow-modified telepaths smuggled aboard Earth ships to disable the fleet at Mars.

In season 5, Alexander becomes romantically involved with Byron, revealing to the telepaths that they had been created by the Vorlons as weapons for their war with the Shadows. After Byron's death, Alexander gets inspired by his cause to create a homeworld for telepaths, and becomes the leader of a movement sponsoring violent resistance against the Corps. Lyta also begins to more thoroughly explore the abilities the Vorlons had given her. She eventually gets arrested aboard Babylon 5 for supporting terrorism by John Sheridan. Michael Garibaldi makes a deal with her to help her avoid prosecution and provide funding for her cause. Former Narn Ambassador G'Kar takes her with him on a mission of exploration.

=== Characterization ===
The character of Lyta Alexander has been subject to literary analysis, for example, in the dimension of feminine identity.

== Conceptual history ==
Lyta was introduced in the pilot episode "The Gathering" as a telepath assigned to the Babylon 5 space station by the Psi Corps, a fictional organization providing support to telepaths and monitoring their activity. However, she did not appear in the remainder of season 1 due to a dispute concerning Tallman's salary. Lyta's role was largely taken up by Andrea Thompson, who was cast as Talia Winters, a telepath who took over Lyta's responsibilities at the station. After Thompson left the series due to disagreements regarding the amount of screen time given to her character, Lyta returned as a recurring character in seasons 2 and 3 after Capt. John Sheridan took over as station commander and became a regular cast member from season 4 on. Her character simply resumed the dramatic arc once intended for Thompson's.

Lyta does not appear in any of the canonical materials released since the end of the series. It is strongly implied in Crusade and some of the canonical novels that her actions (both on Babylon 5 in 2262 and afterward) led to the Telepath War of the mid-2260s, in which she was killed. According to Straczynski, Lyta was intended to appear in the Crusade episode "The Path of Sorrows" as part of a flashback, but Tallman's salary negotiations failed. The scene featured an unnamed telepath who died striking against the Psi Corps. Whether or not this was meant to be Lyta, Straczynski confirmed that she died in such an attack. In the aforementioned script book, Straczynski wrote that both Lyta and Lennier were killed in the explosion of Psi Corps Headquarters in a major battle of the Telepath War. Hints about her death had also been given by Straczynski in posts to the Babylon 5 newsgroup. and in the final novel of the Psi Corps Trilogy by J. Gregory Keyes
