= Earth Alliance =

Earth Alliance may refer to:

- Earth Alliance (Babylon 5), from the Babylon 5 TV series
- Earth Alliance (Gundam), from the Mobile Suit Gundam SEED anime series
