= Londo Mollari =

Babylon 5 character

- Babylon 5 character
- First appearance: Babylon 5: In the Beginning (chronological) Babylon 5: The Gathering (airdate)
- Last appearance: War Without End (chronological), Babylon 5: the Road Home (by release)
- Portrayed by: Peter Jurasik
- Voiced by: Peter Jurasik

In-universe information
- Species: Centauri
- Home planet: Centauri Prime
- Affiliated with: Babylon 5, Centauri Republic

Londo Mollari is a fictional character in the universe of the science fiction television series Babylon 5, played by Peter Jurasik.

Although Londo began as a supporting player in the early episodes, his actions and character development as the series progressed had an immeasurable effect on the show, making him one of the more significant characters in the series. He begins as an apparent stock character assigned to the role of loud, jovial comic relief. Later in the series, he is shown to be an embittered patriot of a dying empire, eager to restore its primacy. In doing so, he becomes largely an unwitting pawn of the Shadows, and the intrigues that he engages in are central to the show's plot. Mollari is also a man of honor, and the moral consequences of his plots weigh heavily on him. By the series' end, he finally makes things right at the cost of his own life.

== Character description ==
=== Overview ===
Londo Mollari is a member of one of the oldest Noble Houses of the Centauri Republic. He is a mercurial personality given to extreme manifestations of anger, sadness, or joviality, depending on the power of the catalyst provoking them. While he is an avid hedonist who is fond of drink and leisure, he is also a devout Centauri patriot and would gladly give his life without hesitation to protect the Republic. A staunch traditionalist, Londo has a profound sense of pride which is tied to the heritage of the Centauri imperial history, when the republic was a vast empire with tremendous influence across the known galaxy; Londo was once a military officer with several heroic accomplishments, which he relishes and often reminisces on when intoxicated. But the decline of the expansionist tradition has weakened the prestige of the Centauri Republic in the eyes of the galactic community, particularly the emancipation of the Narn homeworld from Centauri colonial rule. These developments have wounded Londo's pride in his people and himself, and he is extremely bitter about his people's loss of face. He resents the Narn for their eventual success in establishing themselves as a viable independent power and for what he feels is their part in the increasingly unimportant and humiliating political positions he has held in the latter years of his life, most of which were diplomatic titles with little significance in the royal court. Londo's greatest desire is to see the restoration of the Centauri Republic to the glory and influence it held in older times, and it is this desperate longing that proves the undoing of himself and his people.

Despite his temperamental and stodgy nature, Londo himself is largely devoid of malice. His bigotry towards other races, particularly the Narns, is largely based on habituation and national identity rather than actual hatred; he is rather fond of humans given the similarities in behavior between them and his own people, and speaks in obvious admiration of the human military's tenacity during the Earth–Minbari war. Londo is averse to violence and is often at odds with himself over his desire for military victory and the horror he feels at the suffering and death of others; when he is present at the Second Conquest of Narn, he is visibly sickened by the level of destruction and death he has semi-unwittingly caused and later challenges Lord Refa over his use of outlawed Mass Drivers in the planetary assault on Narn. He yearns for honor and respect, but is often uncomfortable with the cost and responsibilities that come with it.

Londo is very appreciative of his friends and reluctantly tolerant of insincerity; he often chooses the friendship of people with temperaments similar to his own but with personalities suited towards brutal honesty (Michael Garibaldi) or sincere naivety (Lennier, Vir Cotto). Of the three wives he possesses, the only one he does not divorce is his abrasive wife Timov (who absolutely despises him and shows him not the slightest shred of respect) because her scathing honesty is preferable to the feigned friendliness and scheming of the other two. His greatest love, other than his people, is the romantic company of Lady Adira, a former slave and dancer whose benign and sincere nature pierced all the practised cynicism he has built over the course of his life. One of Londo's few real friends is Urza Jaddo, whom Londo must kill in a duel because of the intrigues of Lord Refa.

Londo's closest friend is his attache Vir Cotto. Initially, the two had a comically adversarial relationship: Vir was guileless, naive and extremely honest and empathetic, making him completely inept at Centauri political process, which irked Londo no end. Londo thoroughly enjoyed tormenting him with outrageous demands and workloads in an attempt to train him to be a more efficient Centauri, but over the course of The Shadow War, the Earth Civil War, and the rebuilding of Centauri, the two became almost inseparable. Though Londo never truly abandons his playful condescension towards Vir for his beneficence and even disagrees with his empathy at times, Londo admires and envies Vir's innocence and respects his opinion and assistance throughout his career.

The onset of the wars that nearly consume the galaxy in the series – especially his own complicity in their occurrence – changes Londo from an embittered patriot longing for the old days to a more introspective and sympathetic man determined to rebuild not just his own society, but that of others; prior to his coronation as Emperor, he becomes a significant force in emancipating and restoring Narn and in assisting the Interstellar Alliance in bringing peace to the galaxy.

=== Ambassador to Babylon 5 ===
The Centauri culture in the series is patterned on the conventions of early imperial Rome (which still fancied itself a Republic despite having an Emperor at its head) and portrayed with a nod to the visualizations of the empire depicted in the Dune motion picture (with futuristic versions of 18th-century uniform and clothes as the choice for Centauri attire). The Centauri state is depicted in decline: it falls prey to decadence and internal politics even while it hungers to return to its days of glory. As such, Londo is depicted as a reflection of the society from which he comes. In the words of series creator J. Michael Straczynski, he is "overweight, prone to gambling constantly (null-pool is his favorite) and fond of women and drinks". Considered something of a buffoon even among the Centauri, Londo has been assigned the post of Centauri Ambassador to Babylon 5 to keep him out of the way (according to Babylon 5: In the Beginning he used to be the official Centauri Ambassador on Earth).

At the start of the series, Londo seems to be ineffective in his role as ambassador. His drunken temper tantrums and posturing upon the glories of the "Great Centauri Past" make him appear to be a buffoon. However, he climbs Centauri Prime's political ladder through manipulating his people's hatred of the Narn Regime (former slaves of the Centauri, who fought for and won their independence). Indeed, Londo has a hatred for the Narn Ambassador, G'Kar when the series begins. Gradually, however, this softens as time passes. Towards the end of the series, Londo and G'Kar put their differences aside and for the most part, become friends, of sorts. His cynical political ambition – and his sincere craving to restore the pre-eminence of Centauri Prime – make him into the perfect target for the dark and mysterious Morden, who is secretly representing the Shadows as they work to rebuild their strength. Morden asks each of the major Ambassadors one question – "What do you want?" – only Londo gives him the appropriate answer: glory and prestige for himself and the Centauri. Through the course of the series, Morden and his "Associates" repeatedly give Londo exactly what he asks for, which proves to be far from what Londo actually wants. As Narn fleets continue to be wiped out without any survivors to explain how, Londo takes credit and attracts a great deal of much-desired attention and power, never questioning the consequences of his alliance with the Shadows until it is far too late.

Eventually, after having proved the capability of his "Associates" beyond any doubt, Morden begins to request favors from Londo. Londo, driven by his own pride as well as his fear that Morden may leave and turn elsewhere for help, gives in each time. Despite his conscience bothering him about the nature of these requests, he finds himself unable to sever his connection with Morden.

=== Saving Centauri Prime ===
As the events of the Shadow War come to a peak, Mollari is promoted to the position of advisor on planetary security, which requires him to return to his home world. Mollari is angered by the promotion, understanding that it is not a reward for his service but a leash to keep him and his newfound power under control. Upon his return to Centauri Prime, Mollari discovers that the young Emperor Cartagia, whose ascent to the throne he personally endorsed, is insane and has allowed the Shadows to establish a base on Centauri Prime. At the same time, the Vorlons have begun a campaign to completely destroy any planet where the Shadows have influence. In his insanity, Cartagia believes the Shadows would elevate him to godhood and insists they stay. Mollari realized that in order to deal with the Shadows and save his world from the Vorlons, Cartagia must be killed.

Mollari begins a conspiracy to have Cartagia assassinated, with the help of Vir Cotto, a number of high-ranking Centauri, and G'Kar, who is Cartagia's prisoner at the time. They plan to lure Cartagia to Narn, where he will be away from the majority of his guards and vulnerable. There, G'Kar will be able to create a security threat by escaping, and in the confusion Londo will kill Cartagia by injecting him with a poison that will cause both of his hearts to shut down. The plot succeeds, although as it turns out, Cartagia attacks Londo and Vir must inject the poison. After the Emperor is pronounced dead, Mollari fulfills a promise to G'Kar, that in return for his help, Narn will be freed from Centauri rule (although the Narn believe that they have once again driven the Centauri away "through strength").

With Cartagia dead and a Vorlon fleet en route to destroy Centauri Prime, Mollari is promoted to the position of Prime Minister, making him temporarily head of state until a new Emperor can be elected. With his new power, Mollari proceeds to blow up the Shadow base on Centauri Prime, and then execute their agent, Morden – who, he discovers, had Adira killed. He believes that this would redeem Centauri Prime from being destroyed by the Vorlons; however, Vir realizes that Londo himself has been influenced and used by the Shadows, and so the Vorlons would want him destroyed too. As the Vorlon fleet comes into orbit around Centauri Prime, blotting out the sun, it becomes clear that the Vorlons would destroy the whole planet just to get Mollari. Londo implores Vir to kill him and show the Vorlons he had done it, but is saved by the fact that at the same time, in another part of the galaxy, a fleet led by Sheridan is battling the Shadows and Vorlons at Corianna 6 (Sheridan's fleet's final battle, as it turns out), and the Vorlons call in all their remaining ships to help. Thus Vir does not have to kill Londo, and the planet is spared. But in saving Centauri Prime, Londo has unknowingly doomed his world to a different fate that will be almost as terrible.

=== Emperor Mollari II ===
Following the galactic war with the Shadows, Mollari eventually rises to become Emperor of the Centauri Republic, taking the title Emperor Mollari II (since another member of his family was Emperor in the past). One of his first acts as the new Emperor is to name Vir Cotto as his replacement on Babylon 5— a job not highly prized because of the earlier Centauri conquest of Narn— though Londo knows that Vir will fulfill the job dutifully, even if some of the other ambassadors distrust him.

Before his official installation as Emperor Mollari II, Londo confides in his now ex-bodyguard, Ambassador G'Kar, "When we met, I had no power and all the choices I could ever want. Now I have all the power I could ever want and no choices at all."

At the end of the fifth season, it is revealed that the Drakh had manipulated the Interstellar Alliance into attacking the Centauri Homeworld and decided they needed Londo to be Emperor. The Regent, Virini, dies when his keeper is removed, and another keeper is attached to Londo. For the next 15 years, Londo reigns as Emperor. He soon learns that alcohol puts the Keeper to sleep, allowing him a few minutes of freedom.

When the Drakh kidnap David Sheridan, the son of John and Delenn, the couple come to Centauri Prime to free him. Both Sheridan and Delenn are captured by the Centauri. Mollari tries to force the Drakh to leave; they respond by exploding fusion bombs they had planted on the surface of the planet. Mollari is told to execute Sheridan and is able to convince his Keeper that he will soon kill both Sheridan and Delenn. He then ingests enough alcohol to put the Keeper to sleep and frees Sheridan, Delenn, and their son in exchange for their help in freeing the Centauri from the Drakh.

Mollari knows that his Keeper will soon wake up and alert the other Drakh that he had set his friends free, and that the Drakh will kill them, and then kill him for his betrayal. G'Kar enters the throne room. Mollari explains the situation and begs G'Kar to kill him before the Keeper wakes up, saying "I am as tired of my life as you are." G'Kar begins to crush Mollari's throat, but does not finish before the Keeper awakens. The Keeper seizes control of Mollari and retaliates. Mollari and G'Kar finally die at each other's hands, just as Londo has predicted 20 years before.

A few hours before his death, in the events of Babylon 5: In the Beginning, Mollari had a random encounter with two Centauri children (who turned out to be the nephew and niece of Urza Jaddo, while their governess, Senna, proved to be the daughter of Lord Refa). He granted them a favor by telling them the tale of the Earth-Minbari War. He also commented upon the terrible events that had befallen Centauri Prime, saying that while he had cared for each of his wives in his own way, he loved Centauri Prime the most, and that everything he had done had been "for her".

Following Mollari's death, Vir Cotto finds Mollari and G'Kar's lifeless bodies on the floor of the throne room. He manages to escape from the Centauri homeworld (avoiding the inevitable Drakh attempt to place a Keeper on him), and goes to Minbar. In a conference with the surviving members of the Centauri houses, Cotto is named the next Emperor, fulfilling Lady Morella's prophecy that both Londo and Vir would be Emperor, but one would be Emperor only after the other's death. Emperor Cotto is able to finally free his homeworld from the clutches of the Drakh. To commemorate Londo and G'Kar, he orders twin statues of them erected in front of the Centauri Royal Palace, symbolically guarding the city and watching each other's backs.

In 2281, John Sheridan is dying. Emperor Cotto goes to Minbar for one last meal with Sheridan and his friends. When the time comes to remember all who died, Cotto raises his glass to the memory of Londo Mollari.

== Reception and literary analysis ==
Londo has been subject to literary analysis, for example as a leader.
