= G'Kar =

- Babylon 5 character
- First appearance: Babylon 5: In the Beginning (chronological), The Gathering (airdate)
- Last appearance: Sleeping in Light (chronological), Babylon 5: the Road Home (by release)
- Portrayed by: Andreas Katsulas
- Voiced by: Andrew Morgado

In-universe information
- Species: Narn
- Gender: Male
- Occupation: diplomat, revolutionary leader
- Affiliation: Babylon 5, Narn Regime
- Home planet: Narn

G'Kar (/dʒəˈkɑːr/ juh-KARR) is a fictional character in Babylon 5 played by Andreas Katsulas. He is a Narn and initially appears as a villainous diplomat opposite Londo Mollari, being constantly engaged in insidious, if petty, and often comical schemes. He is usually driven by his hostility to his people's historical enemies the Centauri, whom Londo represents. Over the course of the series, he is transformed into a Messianic figure and the foremost spiritual leader of his people.

== Character History ==
=== Early life ===
In Babylon 5, G'Kar was a pouchling during the first Centauri occupation of his homeworld. His family served as servants in a Centauri household. This was when the Narn resistance movement was gaining strength and their increased aggression was slowly driving the Centauri out of Narn.

After G'Kar's mother became very ill, only he and his father remained fit enough to serve in their Centauri master's household. One day his father accidentally spilled a bowl of hot jala upon the mistress of the house. As punishment, his father was beaten to a pulp and hung up on their family prayer tree. He lasted for three days before he finally died. G'Kar was with him, and his father told him just before he died that he was proud of him, and to do all the things that he could not – Fight the Centauri.

In a rage, G'Kar ran away and killed his first Centauri that very day. He later on joined the resistance movement. After the Centauri were driven off, he worked in the military, participating in at least one invasion during the expansion of the Narn Regime (the Tuchanq). By his admission later on, during this invasion, he participated in atrocities.

In addition, G'Kar dealt with the Earth Alliance during the Earth-Minbari War to secretly sell desperately needed weapons that could be effective against the seemingly invincible Minbari. To G'Kar, the fact that this profitable exchange could also falsely implicate the Centauri Republic (since the Narn were selling Centauri weapons that were left behind as the result of the Centauri withdrawal from Narn space) was worth the risk of incurring the wrath of the Minbari themselves. Regardless, G'Kar also assisted in efforts to explore an opportunity for a peace settlement for the war offered by the Head of the Rangers while he offered to grant asylum to John Sheridan and a few compatriots.

=== Career ===
G'Kar was Narn ambassador to Babylon 5, and a member of the third circle of the Kha'Ri, the heart and the ruling body of Narn Regime. During his time as ambassador, he was notorious for his hatred of Londo Mollari, and of the Centauri Republic Mollari represented. His hatred led G'Kar in 2258 to be a party to various underhanded schemes intended to further the goals of his government whether they be sheltering the notorious Dilgar war criminal, Deathwalker, to attempting to incite riots on the station.

In mid-2259, the dying Centauri Emperor Turhan visited Babylon 5 to "stand with a Narn in neutral territory and apologize" for all the evil and suffering the Centauri have inflicted upon the Narn. G'kar was prepared to assassinate the Emperor before he learned of this. After the Emperor's intentions were relayed to him, he sought Mollari and offered him a drink in celebration of a new understanding between their two peoples.

By a sad irony, at that point, Mollari had already arranged for the Shadows to attack the Narn base on Quadrant 14 to ensure that Refa and his allies could consolidate their power on the eve of the Centauri Emperor's death. After learning of the attack on Quadrant 14 “by the Centauri”, G'Kar attempted to attack Mollari but was stopped by Sheridan. Sheridan gave G'Kar a choice – if he attacked Mollari, he might very well end up dead and would be of no use to his people. But if he restrained himself, he would stay alive and be able to help his people greatly (this proved true, as G'Kar became instrumental in the war against the Shadows and the later liberation of Narn). In a feat of tremendous self-restraint, G'Kar stayed his hand. Instead, he sat on the ground, weeping.

=== The Narn-Centauri War ===
After the second Narn-Centauri war, and the subsequent surrender of the Narn Regime, G'Kar was the only member of the Kha'Ri not captured. Mollari returned to Babylon 5 after having watched the bombardment of Narn by the Centauri using mass-drivers. Mollari proceeded to deliver the terms of the Narn surrender, including the arrest of all members of the Kha'Ri. However, because he had asked for sanctuary, G'Kar had already been placed under the protection both Babylon 5 and of the Minbari Federation for as long as G'Kar remained on the station. Nevertheless, Londo had G'Kar removed from the Council as he was no longer the official representative of Narn.

Instead of leaping across the room to snap Mollari's neck, G'Kar calmly rose and addressed the council;

"No dictator, no invader, can hold an imprisoned population by the force of arms forever. There is no greater power in the universe than the need for freedom. Against that power governments, and tyrants, and armies can not stand. The Centauri learned this lesson once. We will teach it to them again. Though it take a thousand years, we will be free."

=== “Enlightenment” ===
During the six months or so after the Narn-Centauri war, G'Kar had offered much assistance to the underground resistance back on Narn. In exchange for G'Kar's cooperation in toning down these activities, Sheridan was able to pressure the Centauri into releasing the Narn colonists on Quadrant 14. He maintained control of the Narn aboard Babylon 5 to ensure that the others would be more sympathetic to their plight. He also helped expose a plot to use Babylon 5 as a Centauri munitions drop point. Also, with help from Michael Garibaldi, he was able to establish a safe location for smuggling weapons into Narn and its colonies.

G'kar spent the later part of the year 2259 as well as early 2260 being obsessed with avenging his people against the Centauri in general, and Mollari in particular. He maintained the steady flow of smuggled weapons onto Narn. As the last of the Kha'Ri still free, G'Kar inspired those on his homeworld to rise and resist their would-be invaders. His authority was challenged, at one point, by a fellow Narn, Na'Far, who was appointed by the Centauri as the new official ambassador of the Regime to Babylon 5. However, Na'Far not only failed, his bodyguard, Ta'Lon (whom Sheridan had saved on a Streib ship), became G'Kar's most avid follower and confidant.

A few months later, G'Kar obtained a highly illegal Earth drug known as “Dust”, which gives the user temporary but incredibly powerful telepathic abilities. G'Kar intended to use this weapon to fight the Centauri, but the effects on Narn physiology were unknown; the Narns had no surviving heritage of telepaths. He opted to use himself as a test subject, with great success – he was able to abduct and telepathically mutilate Mollari (severely beating both him and his assistant, Vir Cotto, in an amazing display of superior Narn strength), and learn many of his secrets, including his role in instigating the second Narn-Centauri war, as well as the “embarrassing” circumstances that led to his assignment on Babylon 5.

However, as the drug wore off, he experienced what he believed to be a religious revelation from his “father figures”, namely the Narn holy figure G'Quan, his own biological father, and the angelic being called G'Lan (all of which were actually Vorlon Ambassador Kosh Naranek, who also used a “father figure” when he appeared to Sheridan months later). In his vision, G'Kar was told to let go of his hatred and serve a higher cause – the survival of his race and of everyone. To achieve this, he, and the Narns, had to become willing to sacrifice themselves. As the G'Quan apparition puts it:

What is there left for Narn if all of creation falls around us? There’s nothing. No hope, no dream, no future, no life. Unless we turn from the cycle of death toward something greater. If we are a dying people, then let us die with honor, by helping the others as no one else can… We are fighting to save one another, we must realize we are not alone. We rise and fall together. And some of us must be sacrificed if all are to be saved. Because, if we fail in this, then none of us will be saved. And the Narn will be only a memory.

G'Kar was arrested for this attack and pleaded guilty. He allowed himself to be placed in Babylon 5's brig, where he dedicated himself to meditating on his revelation, eventually writing down his thoughts and observations. He was released early, due to the fighting between Earth forces and Babylon 5. He promised to assist the humans – and delivered, providing Babylon 5 with a Narn security force to replace those soldiers who remained loyal to Earth.

=== Liberation of Narn ===
When Michael Garibaldi was kidnapped, G'Kar went searching for him, only to be captured by Centauri forces and taken to Centauri Prime. There he was presented as a gift to Londo Mollari by Emperor Cartagia. However, Cartagia first decided to torture G'Kar. He endured much and was even tortured by Cartagia himself, but G'Kar refused to give him the satisfaction of hearing him cry out in pain. He revealed this to Londo and Vir; Mollari then explained if he did not scream soon G'Kar would most definitely die. This refusal to scream under torture has been shown previously during Season 1 when G'kar was being tortured with paingivers by a Narn assassin. Londo and Vir decided to act fast as they knew they would need G'Kar's help to kill Cartagia. Mollari approached G'Kar in secret and explained that Cartagia was sadistic and insane, and that the fate of both the Narn and Centauri people depended on his removal from the throne. Mollari offered a deal – if G'Kar would assist by providing a distraction at the proper moment, Mollari himself would assassinate the mad emperor, and then use his influence to free him.

Assuming G'Kar would agree, Mollari turned to leave. G'Kar replied by saying that Mollari did not ask the price, and that he would only agree to it if Mollari would use his influence to free Narn. Mollari pointed out that G'Kar was in no position to make demands. G'Kar's response was, “Neither are you.” Soon after this conversation Cartagia held one last torture session with G'Kar that Londo and Vir witnessed. He ordered a soldier to whip him with an energy whip that would kill any Narn with forty strokes and stated that the whipping would not stop until he heard the scream he so much wanted. G'Kar held until the last whip stroke, and only screamed as it was necessary to save his people. Soon after this Londo convinced Cartagia to travel to the Narn homeworld to judge G'Kar there. But before they left Cartagia ordered a guard to gouge one of G'Kar's eyes out, as he did not like how he looked at him.

When they arrived at Narn, they made preparations for the assassination and it succeeded, albeit with Mollari's aide Vir Cotto inadvertently killing Cartagia. Mollari kept his word and freed both G'Kar and the Narn people. The Narn then offered G'Kar the chance to rule the planet, which he flatly refused in favor of a new Kha'Ri that he insisted must be formed, and citing the fact that he did not endure so much pain and personal suffering to remove one tyrant from his planet, only to become one himself.

Shortly after returning to Babylon 5, he is visited by Garibaldi, who was genuinely apologetic for G'Kar having to endure so much torture, simply for looking for him. G'Kar explained that Garibaldi was one of the few non-Narn friends he had, and far from being angry, he was actually quite grateful. In doing so, G'Kar said he was put in precisely the right place at precisely the right time to free his people, something which would never have happened had Garibaldi not been kidnapped in the first place.

=== Declaration of Principles ===
Upon his return to Babylon 5, he resumed his role as Narn Ambassador, and was instrumental in the founding of the Interstellar Alliance. G'Kar was a member of that organization's advisory council, and wrote the Declaration of Principles. A later draft of these principles read as follows:

The Universe speaks in many languages, but only one voice. The language is not Narn, or Human, or Centauri, or Gaim or Minbari. It speaks in the language of hope; It speaks in the language of trust; It speaks in the language of strength, and the language of compassion. It is the language of the heart and the language of the soul. But always, it is the same voice. It is the voice of our ancestors, speaking through us, And the voice of our inheritors, waiting to be born. It is the small, still voice that says: We are one. No matter the blood; No matter the skin; No matter the world; No matter the star; We are one. No matter the pain; No matter the darkness; No matter the loss; No matter the fear; We are one. Here, gathered together in common cause. we agree to recognise this singular truth, and this singular rule: That we must be kind to one another, because each voice enriches us and ennobles us, and each voice lost diminishes us. We are the voice of the Universe, the soul of creation, the fire that will light the way to a better future. We are one.

Immediately after this draft was approved by all members of the ISA, G'Kar insisted that it be recalled, as he had written a better version. While ISA President John Sheridan did agree that this version was better, the text of that version is unknown, and no record exists whether this improved version was also approved.

=== Londo’s bodyguard and rise to “holiness” ===
Later, when Mollari returned to Centauri Prime to investigate potential corruption in the Centauri Court, Minbari Ambassador Delenn requested that G'Kar return with Mollari as his bodyguard. G'Kar accepted, if only to see the looks on the faces of the Centauri court. Upon his return to Babylon 5, he discovered that the book of religious observations he had been writing had been “liberated” by a friend (his former bodyguard, Ta'Lon), who believed him dead, and published as "Book of G'Kar". It was received well, and its popularity was approaching that of the Book of G'Quan. G'Kar had – quite unwittingly and unwillingly – become a holy figure.

G'Kar found his new holy status very frustrating; While many Narn were coming to him for guidance, they were more interested in applying their own interpretation of his words, or focusing on some things he had said while ignoring others – even when he himself was insisting otherwise. His sermons, however, were often quite inspired. For example, when asked “What is truth, and what is God?” he explained:

If I take a lamp and shine it toward the wall, a bright spot will appear on the wall. The lamp is our search for truth, for understanding. Too often we assume that the light on the wall is God, but the light is not the goal of the search, it is the result of the search. The more intense the search, the brighter the light on the wall. The brighter the light on the wall, the greater the sense of revelation upon seeing it. Similarly, someone who does not search, who does not bring a lantern with him, sees nothing. What we perceive as God is the by-product of our search for God. It may simply be an appreciation of the light, pure and unblemished, not understanding that it comes from us. Sometimes, we stand in front of the light and assume we are the center of the universe – God looks astonishingly like we do! – or we turn to look at our shadow and assume all is darkness. If we allow ourselves to get in the way, we defeat the purpose – which is use the light of our search to illuminate the wall in all its beauty and all its flaws, and in so doing, better understand the world around us.

His popularity was creating political pressure on the restored Kha'Ri as well, who finally insisted that he either come home to rule or publicly give them his blessing. The last straw was when he was forced to bluntly rebuke a particularly obnoxious would-be worshipper, and the offended admirer attempted to assassinate him in retaliation, but ended up severely wounding Garibaldi's fiancée instead. G'Kar decided to leave Babylon 5 and explore the galaxy with Lyta Alexander, knowing that he could do no more for his people there and that to stay would only cause more unrest. He appointed Ta'Lon as his successor. Ta'Lon was quite surprised by the selection, but in a recorded message, G'Kar explained he had become a distraction for his people, and that a position such as G'Kar's required one to be equal parts warrior and priest. G'Kar felt he had become more priest than warrior, and to create a balance, someone who was more warrior than priest was required to succeed him: someone like Ta'Lon.

As in depicted in the TV movie, Legend of the Rangers, G'Kar plays a role in reforming the Rangers when he defended Ranger David Martel from dismissal for withdrawing from battle when his ship is severely damaged to the point where it lost all practical fighting ability. Ambassador G'Kar convinces the Rangers' ruling council that they were being unreasonable for seeking to punish a ranger for merely exercising appropriate prudence for the sake of his crew. When Martel and his crew became the heroes of the hour by saving an ambassadorial party, which included G'Kar himself, from The Hand, the Narn's argument was vindicated.

G'Kar would later return to Babylon 5 at least once more for a diplomatic conference.

=== Death ===
G'Kar died in 2278 while locked in combat with the Drakh Keeper controlling Londo Mollari's body. (Londo was tired of living and requested that G'Kar kill both him and Drakh). The sacrifice of G'Kar and Londo allowed Sheridan, Delenn, and their son David to escape from Centauri Prime.

=== Aftermath ===
After the death of G'Kar in Centauri Prime, Emperor Vir Cotto honored G'Kar and Londo's sacrifice by building a gigantic statue of them at the main gates to the Centauri capital city. These statues were built so that the two men were standing guard over the city, and watching each other's backs. The Book of G'Kar continued to gain popularity following his death, and along with G'Quan he became one of the most widely read authors amongst the Narn. Shortly before he died in 2281, John Sheridan had one last meal with his friends. During the toast for all those who had died, Michael Garibaldi eulogized G'Kar.

== Actor History ==
Andreas Katsulas died on February 13, 2006, due to lung cancer. As a result, except for archival footage, the character of G'Kar will not make any future appearances in Babylon 5-related television or movie productions. In the Babylon 5: The Lost Tales 2007 anthology, it is explained that both G'Kar and Stephen Franklin, who was played by Richard Biggs (deceased in 2004), had left to explore space beyond the galactic rim.

== Reception and literary analysis ==
G'Kar has been subject to literary analysis, for example as a leader. According to Kimberly Yost, initially an antagonist ("an angry and self-righteously indignant"), he "evolves to a sympathetic freedom fighter, democratic idealist and spiritual leader". Yost also notes that treatment of G'Kar and the Narns in general is relevant to the discourse of racism. Due to Narn having reptilian (if humanoid) appearance, their "monstrous" appearance led to issues of trust when dealing with other races.
