= Louis Turenne =

Canadian actor

Louis Turenne (November 26, 1933 – 25 July 2006) was a Canadian actor on television, in films, and on stage. He was born in Montreal, Quebec.

== Career ==
=== Television ===
From 1977 to 1978, he played the role of Anthony Saxon on The Edge of Night.

Turenne was known for his work on the Babylon 5 television series. He played the Minbari Draal in the first season two-part episode "A Voice in the Wilderness". The producers later cast him in the recurring role of Brother Theo, the leader of a group of Catholic monks who came to live on the station.

=== Film ===
He also played "The Fireside Gourmet" in the 1988 romantic comedy drama film Mystic Pizza.

=== Stage ===
In 1984, The Philadelphia Inquirer said in a review of Antigone by Jean Anouilh that Louis Turenne playing Creon "is the strongest actor in the cast, and the play really only comes to life when he is on stage". Critic Douglas J. Keating added that "Turenne, aided by Anouilh's eloquence, presents his arguments passionately. There is conviction in his voice as he circles around Antigone in the play's major scene, first affecting an avuncular tone as he tries to get her to change her mind and then moving to vicious invective as he tells her what a cad was Polynices, the slain brother whom Antigone, in defiance of Creon's orders, symbolically buried."

In 1989, Turenne was playing a butler in the Somerset Maugham play The Circle, when he suddenly had to switch roles during the last act to stand in for 81-year-old Rex Harrison, who was unable to continue his performance due to the lingering effects of dental surgery.
