= List of Babylon 5 characters =

The Babylon 5 cast

The list of Babylon 5 characters contains characters from the entire Babylon 5 universe. In the Babylon 5 television show, the Babylon space stations are conceived as sites of diplomacy and cultural exchange. There are five dominant civilizations represented in the Babylon 5 universe: Humans (also known as "Earthers"), Narn, Centauri, Minbari and Vorlons; and several dozen less powerful ones. A number of the less powerful races make up the League of Non-Aligned Worlds, which assembled as a result of the Dilgar War occurring 30 years before the start of the series.

== Main characters ==
=== Jeffrey Sinclair ===
Jeffrey Sinclair, played by actor Michael O'Hare, is the Commander of the Babylon 5 station in season one. After one full season, O'Hare and series executive producer/creator J. Michael Straczynski made the decision for the character and actor to depart as a regular. O'Hare subsequently reprised the character of Sinclair briefly in season two and a two-episode guest appearance in season three, enabling the show to wrap up loose ends. As a result of this departure, there are several minor inconsistencies between the first season and the remainder of the show, most visibly in "And the Sky Full of Stars" and "Babylon Squared". At O'Hare's personal request, the full reasons for his departure from the show were kept secret until after his death in 2012. The following year, Straczynski revealed that O'Hare struggled with delusions and paranoia due to mental illness, which ultimately prevented him from continuing to act. However, Straczynski emphasized that O'Hare's fans, particularly those of his role as Sinclair, had helped him cope with his struggle.

The character was born on Mars Colony. In an early episode of season one, Sinclair stated that his family had been pilots "ever since the Battle of Britain" and Sinclair's father was a fighter pilot for EarthForce who participated in the Battle of Balos, the last engagement of the Dilgar Invasion. Sinclair continued the tradition and became a fighter pilot. Sinclair enlisted in EarthForce in 2237. During his time at EarthForce Academy, he met Catherine Sakai, with whom he had a relationship. After a year of living together, the two of them broke up, but continued to see each other off and on through 2258, when they became engaged. Sakai went missing in late 2259, while on a mission for the Rangers. The season one episode "By Any Means Necessary" establishes that Sinclair received Jesuit education as a young man.

In 2240, Sinclair was promoted to fighter pilot, continuing a Sinclair family tradition. Less than a year later, Sinclair was promoted to squadron leader. Due to his rapid rise through the ranks, the rumor of the day was that Sinclair was on the fast track to making Admiral. As squadron leader, Sinclair fought at the Battle of the Line, the last major battle in the Earth-Minbari War. During the course of the battle, his squadron was destroyed by the Minbari, and his fighter was badly damaged. In a last act of defiance, Sinclair attempted to ram one of the Minbari cruisers. He failed in this when he was captured by another Minbari cruiser for interrogation by the Grey Council. The council's Triluminary detected Valen's DNA in Sinclair, so they assumed, to their profound shock, that he possessed the soul of Valen, a hero of the Minbari who led them to victory 1,000 years ago against the Shadows. It was concluded by the Grey Council that Minbari souls were being born into human bodies. The discovery of what Sinclair possessed led the Minbari to surrender and return Sinclair to his fighter. The memory of his time aboard the Minbari cruiser was blocked—though this block would not be permanent and would break down years later. Sinclair — and the Earth Alliance — believed that he had blacked out from the acceleration. When Babylon 5 was brought into operation in 2257, Sinclair was selected by the Minbari to command the newly constructed station. He was selected over many more senior officers, including Colonel Ari Ben Zayn, all of whom had been vetoed by the Minbari (they had stipulated that they should approve the choice of Station Commander, as they had shared the cost of construction).

In January 2259, Sinclair was reassigned as ambassador to Minbar, where he took command of the Rangers. He was succeeded at Babylon 5 by Captain John Sheridan. In 2260, Sinclair received a 900-year old letter from himself on Minbar, revealing that he was not the reincarnation of Valen, as the Grey Council believed, but in fact Valen himself. Armed with this knowledge, Sinclair took Babylon 4 back with him 1,000 years to aid the Minbari in their first war against the Shadows, and in so doing, fulfilled Minbari prophecy by becoming the One Who Was. It was here that Sinclair used the triluminary to transform himself into a Minbari, thus fulfilling the legend about Valen being "a Minbari not born of Minbari", also explaining why the triluminary responded so strongly to him during his interrogation by the Grey Council, as it had been programmed to respond to his DNA.

=== John Sheridan ===
Bruce Boxleitner played Captain John Sheridan (seasons 2–5), Sinclair's replacement on Babylon 5 after his reassignment, and a central figure of several prophecies within the Shadow War.

=== Susan Ivanova ===
Lieutenant Commander Susan Ivanova (seasons 1–4, guest season 5), second-in-command of Babylon 5, was portrayed by Claudia Christian. Ivanova is initially portrayed as a competent leader who values her work above all else. The show emphasizes her Russian heritage and gradually reveals a tragic backstory that informs her character's actions.

=== Michael Garibaldi ===
Michael Garibaldi was played by Jerry Doyle in seasons one to five and voiced by Anthony Hansen in Babylon 5: The Road Home. He is named after the Italian patriot Giuseppe Garibaldi.

In the first three seasons, Garibaldi serves as chief of security aboard the space station Babylon 5. He holds the rank of Chief Warrant Officer. In season four, during the Shadow War, Garibaldi was secretly subjected to mental reprogramming, which was triggered after the war. Garibaldi resigned from his job as chief of security to work as an independent investigator, helping people find what they had lost during the war. Increasingly, he came into conflict with Babylon 5 staff. Eventually, Bester released Garibaldi from his psychic conditioning by making subtle adjustments to Garibaldi's personality.

Garibaldi started drinking again in season five. Eventually, his long-time lover Lise Hampton returned to Babylon 5 to help support him. They married soon afterward, and he left Babylon 5 to help her run Edgars Industries on Mars, one of the largest corporations on the planet. During the fifth and final season of Babylon 5 he was the Director of Covert Intelligence for the new Interstellar Alliance, a post parallel to the real-life present-day CIA Director. After the episode "Sleeping in Light" Garibaldi returned to his family on Mars. Upon arriving home, he found that his daughter had won a tennis match. Garibaldi's life after Sheridan's departure was relatively peaceful. Series creator J. Michael Straczynski said that his ultimate fate would be much quieter than Garibaldi could have imagined. In three novels - the last book of the Psi Corp trilogy, and the last two books of the Centauri Prime trilogy - the authors explore the period between the end of Babylon 5 and Sheridan's "death" in 2281.

=== Delenn ===
Satai Delenn was played by Mira Furlan in seasons 1–5. She is the Minbari ambassador to Babylon 5. Delenn was originally conceived as being a male character but played by a female actor, in order to give the character feminine mannerisms and therefore make him more "alien". The Babylon 5 pilot TV movie The Gathering was filmed with this in mind, but the computer alteration to Mira Furlan's voice to make it sound masculine wasn't convincing, so the idea was dropped and Delenn was changed to a female. The Minbari makeup used from then on gave Delenn a much more feminine appearance.

When first appearing as the Minbari ambassador to Babylon 5, Delenn hides her status as a leader of the Grey Council. At the start of the 2nd season, Delenn uses a special artifact to transform into a half-human, half-Minbari hybrid. Her transformation is initially treated with suspicion by humans and Minbari alike. Delenn was instrumental in getting Sinclair to be stationed as the first Earth ambassador to Minbar since, unbeknownst to Sinclair initially, they chose him because he was the first human the Grey Council had any direct contact with during the Battle of the Line.

Delenn and John Sheridan fall in love, which drives a further wedge between the Minbari religious and warrior castes, who soon broke a thousand years' of cooperation and began a civil war against one another. After Sheridan and Babylon 5 broke away from Earth, it was Delenn who rescued the station with a fleet of Minbari ships, at the cost of destroying the symbolic circle of the Grey Council. The religious and worker castes sided with Babylon 5 and the Army of Light. Unfortunately, without the Grey Council keeping order, the divisions in Minbari society became so strong that civil war soon broke out. It was later learned that Delenn herself was descended from Valen. Delenn is the "One who is," representing both halves of the Minbari and human race merged, more literally merging in the marriage of Delenn and Sheridan. Together they became war leaders, with Delenn managing to bind together diverse planets and races into a great alliance. Sheridan was the "warrior", while she was the "spirit". This alliance ended the great war between the Shadow and Vorlon races, and ushered in the Third Age for Mankind - a great time of growth and change.

But after the Shadow War ended, both Delenn and Sheridan found their homeworlds embroiled in civil wars. Although her work had saved countless lives and ended the great war, she returned home to a world racked with chaos and death. Delenn and the religious caste surrendered to the warrior clans. She then forced a showdown between herself and the new leader of the warrior caste. This would be a purification in which Delenn could sacrifice herself for her caste and for the Minbari people. With her sacrifice, the leadership of Minbar would continue to be held by the religious caste - not the warriors. Her old rival Neroon saved her life, however. And in his death cries he joined the religious caste, which returned to Delenn the balance of power. Delenn then gave control of the Grey Council to the worker caste, who had for many years stayed in the middle, as the religious and warrior castes simmered with disagreement. After John Sheridan refused to stand for re-election as President of the Interstellar Alliance, Delenn was chosen to succeed him. When she accepted the role, Sheridan took command of the Rangers until his death. Delenn asked Ivanova to succeed him.

=== Stephen Franklin ===
Stephen Franklin was played by Richard Biggs in seasons 1–5 and voiced by Phil LaMarr in Babylon 5: The Road Home. Franklin serves as the chief medical officer on the Babylon 5 space station. He first appeared in the episode "Soul Hunter". In the script of this episode, he was explicitly described as black. J. Michael Straczynski was adamant throughout the run of the series that Franklin be a true individual who could have been played by an actor of any race. Richard Biggs later expressed his gratitude at being able to play a role purely as an actor, not a black actor.

Franklin's character has strong moral convictions. Although he spends most of the series in MedLab saving lives, Franklin also sees his share of action and adventure during the series. He is an active participant in the Earth Alliance Civil War, where he aided the Mars Resistance in its fight to free the Mars colony from Earth control. During the war between the Centauri Republic and the Interstellar Alliance, he worked with the telepath Lyta Alexander in investigating reports of Drazi atrocities against the Centauri on the Drazi homeworld. During the series's fifth and final season, Franklin resigned from his post at Babylon 5 to accept the position of "Head of Xenobiological Research" on Earth upon the retirement of Dr. Benjamin Kyle. He appeared in the Crusade episode "Each Night I Dream of Home".

J. Michael Straczynski has said that Franklin eventually dies while exploring an unknown planet, but has not revealed the details of exactly how or when he dies. When Biggs died in May 2004, Straczynski had been working on a Babylon 5 script titled The Memory of Shadows. Straczynski decided not to recast the Franklin character, and rewrote the script to remove him from the story. In the Babylon 5: The Lost Tales anthology, it is explained that both Franklin and G'Kar – played by Andreas Katsulas who died in February 2006 – had left to explore space beyond the "galactic rim".

=== Talia Winters ===
Talia Winters was portrayed by actress Andrea Thompson in seasons 1–2. Winters was a licensed, commercial telepath from Earth and a member of the Psi Corps organization. She was assigned to the Earth space station Babylon 5 in the year 2258 to serve as its second resident commercial telepath. Like all Psi Corps members, Winters' telepathic ability was numbered according to ability; Winters was classified as a P5, the level of most commercial telepaths. Typically, commercial telepaths were assigned to help two or more business parties broker deals, by monitoring their honesty during business negotiations.

Talia Winters' telepathic abilities manifested at age five. As required by law, her parents immediately sent her to be raised, educated, and trained in her gifts by the Psi Corps. During this time Talia was also tested for telekinesis, but was disappointed to learn that she did not have enough to move even a penny. Over the years, Ms. Winters developed a strong loyalty to Psi Corps, and accepted an internship in the commercial telepath division. During this internship, she met and befriended Lyta Alexander, another P5 telepath who had transferred out of the Psi-Cop division. After completing her education, Winters entered the workforce as a commercial telepath.

In 2258, Talia Winters arrives on Babylon 5 as its second resident commercial telepath. Her work on the station repeatedly brings her into contact with the command staff. Both of the station's commanding officers (Commander Jeffrey Sinclair and Captain John Sheridan) consider her a valuable ally despite her strong loyalty to Psi Corps. Security Chief Michael Garibaldi, who harbors a not-so-secret crush on Winters, is in frequent contact with her. Garibaldi routinely flirts with her and shows up in the station's transport tubes just as she is about to board them. Although annoyed by his unsubtle advances, Winters remains friendly with him and uses her Psi Corps connections to help him contact his former lover, Lise Hampton, during the riots on the Mars colony. Talia Winters's most complicated relationship is with Susan Ivanova, the station's second-in-command. Initially, Ivanova is hostile to Winters' arrival and refuses to acknowledge her presence. Talia quickly discovers that Ivanova's mother was a telepath who, rather than join the Corps, submitted to a decade's worth of drug injections which dampened her spirit along with her abilities. Ivanova blames Psi Corps for her mother's suicide; her experience gives Talia her first opportunity to learn about the darker side of the Psi Corps.

Also in 2258, Jason Ironheart arrives on the station in secret while on the run from the Psi Corps. The experiments he participated in have strengthened his abilities to the point where he can telekinetically manipulate matter at the subatomic level. Ironheart gives his lover two gifts as he transforms into a being of pure energy: her own minor telekinetic abilities, substantially less powerful (and therefore less dangerous) than Ironheart's, and the ability to block the scans of P12 (the highest rated) telepaths. Winters puts these new abilities to use the following year when Psi Cop Al Bester comes to Babylon 5 to stop an Underground Railroad that Ironheart had set up for runaway telepaths. Talia's experience with the fugitive telepaths finally makes her aware of how corrupt the Psi Corps has become. It is this epiphany that finally dissolves the tension between herself and Susan Ivanova; from that point on, the two women develop a mutual respect which later blossoms into a relationship.

In 2259, dissident telepath Lyta Alexander learns of a Psi Corps sleeper program that the Psi Corps had hidden in her. Although she knows one such sleeper has been sent to Babylon 5 to spy on its command staff, she does not know the identity of the spy. Lyta travels to Babylon 5 with the password to activate the sleeper's hidden personality. With the permission of Captain John Sheridan, Lyta sends the password into the minds of individuals among and close to the command staff. When she sends the password into Winters' mind, the hidden personality takes full control of her psyche, effectively killing the Talia Winters that everyone has come to know.

Talia becomes hostile and returns to Earth after the hidden personality takes over. There are concerns among the station's command staff over how much inside knowledge this new Ms. Winters can use against them. By this time, they are convinced that then-Vice President Clark had assassinated his predecessor with help from outsiders so he could assume the presidency, and they are clandestinely gathering evidence to that effect. The staff had just agreed to bring Talia in on the operation, and were on the verge of doing so when Lyta arrived to inform them of the sleeper. Garibaldi himself had mused that if Lyta had come one week later, they'd all be standing in front of a summary court martial board, if not worse. Psi Cop Bester hinted that she was dissected after arriving back on Earth, saying, "We learned some interesting things about Ms Winters in the course of her debriefing and dissect—that is, examination."

=== Vir Cotto ===
Vir Cotto was played by Stephen Furst in seasons 1–5. He is a Centauri male who was from a family of minor nobility. Vir first appears in the episode "Midnight on the Firing Line" as an assistant to Ambassador Londo Mollari. At the time, Vir was an embarrassment to his family, and his family arranged for him to be assigned to this position as a means of getting him as far away from them as possible. In the first two seasons, Vir proves himself to be an able assistant to Ambassador Mollari and also develops a friendship with the aide to the Minbari Ambassador Delenn, the acolyte Lennier.

Vir appears less frequently during the third season, since Stephen Furst had taken a role in a sitcom and couldn't appear in many episodes. This was explained in-universe as a reassignment as liaison to Minbar. Mollari arranges to have this happen in order to help Vir further develop in his career, but privately admits to Delenn that he does not want Vir around with the events - namely the Shadow War - that are soon to come.

Vir Cotto remains an important character during the Shadow War arc, which comprises parts of season 3 and 4. Vir was once again used as a "moral counterpart" to Mollari toward the end of the Shadow War arc. Mollari has Vir come to Centauri Prime to assist in the assassination of Emperor Cartagia. The assassination plot goes astray, with Vir finally being the person to kill the Emperor. Following the Shadow War, Vir returns to Babylon 5. In season 4 and 5, he continues to act as Mollari's assistant, and as a representative of the Centauri to Babylon 5 when Mollari is back on Centauri Prime. When Mollari ascends to the throne as Emperor, he names Vir as the Ambassador to Babylon 5, by then an important position. As was prophesied, Vir succeeds Londo as Emperor of Centauri Republic during the Drakh War. Vir appears after the main series in "The Fall of Centauri Prime" trilogy of tie-in novels, and is Emperor of the Centauri Republic twenty years after the end of the Shadow War, as shown in "Sleeping in Light".

=== Lennier ===
Lennier was played by Bill Mumy in seasons 1–5. He is Minbari and acts as ambassadorial aide to Delenn throughout most of the series.

Just as Delenn was an acolyte of Dukhat, Lennier was the faithful acolyte of Minbari Ambassador Delenn for five years. A member of the Third Fane of Chu'Domo of the religious caste and a fierce fighter, he later joined the Rangers. He had family aboard the Minbari flagship Black Star when it was destroyed by Babylon 5 commander John Sheridan. Though other Minbari felt much animosity toward Sheridan, as they felt he'd acted dishonorably in destroying it, Lennier held no hard feelings, apparently understanding why Sheridan had done it.

In the episode "Day of the Dead," Lennier is confronted by the ghost of Morden, the human who worked with the Shadows. Lennier, who had returned from training hoping to speak to a spirit as part of an alien religious observance, makes the mistake of asking Morden for wisdom. Morden predicts that Lennier will one day betray the Rangers. This encounter foreshadows later events in the series.

Eventually it was revealed that Lennier was secretly in love with Delenn. He explained to Marcus Cole that it was "not romantic love as you would understand it, something nobler." Lennier did not act on his feelings due to her involvement with John Sheridan. Lennier did confess his feelings to her when he and Delenn were both trapped in hyperspace facing death, but Delenn, who had long known of his feelings for her, feigned that she hadn't heard his confession to spare him embarrassment.

Lennier's feelings later caused his downfall. When Sheridan suffered an accident aboard a White Star ("Objects at Rest"), Lennier, seeing for the opportunity to remove his 'competition', refused to help him and fled, for a short moment leaving him for dead. Almost immediately after he realized the foolishness of his actions and did come back, but by then Sheridan had managed to rescue himself. Lennier ran away, deeply ashamed of what he had done, and was never heard from again, except for a final, untraceable call to Delenn in which he asked her and Sheridan for forgiveness. This would likely constitute his "Betrayal of the Rangers" as predicted by Morden.

The series left Lennier's final fate unknown, although most of Morden's prophecies came true and there are hints in the series finale "Sleeping in Light" (during a sequence when the guests were remembering their fallen friends), that Lennier was killed in the Telepath War. This has been confirmed by J. Michael Straczynski in The Babylon 5 Scripts of J. Michael Straczynski TV Movies, in which he writes that both Lennier and Lyta Alexander were killed in the explosion of Psi Corps Headquarters in a major battle of the Telepath War. Straczynski had previously said of Lennier's death (in his commentary for "Sleeping in Light"): "That's a very sad story and maybe I'll tell it some day".

=== Elizabeth Lochley ===
Elizabeth Lochley was played by Tracy Scoggins in the fifth and last season of Babylon 5, replacing the previous commander of the station, John Sheridan, and filling the role of the character Susan Ivanova. She was also a semi-regular character in Crusade, where she has a romantic relationship with Matthew Gideon, the captain of the Excalibur. Lochley featured prominently in the first volume of Babylon 5: The Lost Tales entitled "Voices in the Dark", released on DVD in July 2007.

Due to a troubled youth, Lochley never consumed alcoholic beverages or other drugs from the moment she began her military career. After Captain Sheridan is relieved of his command, he requests Earth to assign Lochley as his replacement. Although she chooses not to join Sheridan's rebellion against the corrupt government headed by Morgan Clark, he still trusts her judgement and ability. The show later reveals that Sheridan and Lochley had been married briefly after graduating from EarthForce Academy. While the marriage did not work out, they still have a mutual respect and appreciation. She proves to be a strong and capable leader, finding solutions to many crises and coping with the ones that had no solutions.

During the Brakiri Day of the Dead, in which the dead return for one night, the Brakiri on the station purchase a part of it for the night which includes Lochley's quarters. She is subsequently visited by the ghost of her friend Zoe, who confirms that she deliberately committed suicide by overdosing on drugs. Prior to this, nobody knew for certain whether Zoe's death was intentional.

Lochley remains in command of the station in the River of Souls television film, where she saves the life a Soul Hunter played by Martin Sheen who comes aboard the station, earning his gratitude. She tries to shut down a holo-brothel that has set up shop in the station's lower levels, and becomes shocked and angry when she discovers that her image is among those available for rent to the brothel's customers.

The series Crusade is set approximately five years after the events of the fifth season of Babylon 5 and show that she is still the captain. In Babylon 5: The Lost Tales, Lochley is still in command of the station but now holds the rank of EarthForce colonel. It is unknown whether she and Gideon are still intimate. During her communication with President Sheridan, Lochley says of Dr Stephen Franklin, "Oh, I thought you'd heard. Doctor Franklin went with G'Kar, exploring beyond the Rim." This was filmed in the last quarter of 2006, with actor Richard Biggs (Franklin) having died in 2004 and actor Andreas Katsulas (G'Kar) having died in February 2006, several months prior to principal photography on The Lost Tales. Actor Tracy Scoggins, who portrays Lochley, admitted on the DVD commentary to having difficulty delivering the line, at one point nearly breaking down in tears. The line was a subtle eulogy to both actors.

=== Marcus Cole ===
Marcus Cole was played by Jason Carter in the third and fourth seasons of the show. He is a leading member of the Rangers, a military force consisting of Humans and Minbari who serve the "One", a triumvirate consisting of Jeffrey Sinclair / Valen, Delenn, and John Sheridan.

The character's backstory is given as being born on the Arisia Mining Colony, where his family operated a relatively dangerous mining operation. His brother William had left the colony and become a Ranger on Minbar; he was killed by the Shadows while visiting Marcus on Arisia. Marcus was one of the few survivors (if not the only survivor) of the attack. Much of Marcus Cole's early background is told in the novel To Dream In the City of Sorrows by Kathryn Drennan. Marcus Cole joined the Rangers following the death of his brother, William, and at times he seems to have joined the Rangers as a form of guilt over his brother's death.

Cole becomes close friends with Dr. Franklin. Defending Delenn during her transition to become "Ranger One", Cole engages Neroon in a fierce one-on-one battle. Despite losing, and nearly being killed, he earns Neroon's respect, even getting Neroon to laugh warmly. It was also revealed on the show (episode: The Summoning) that Marcus Cole was a virgin, a character aspect which was a marked departure for a dashing hero role. However, the combination of his virginity and fighting skill once led him to (only half-jokingly) compare himself to Sir Galahad ("A Late Delivery From Avalon").

He falls in love with Susan Ivanova. However, the two do not become involved. Some attribute this to Ivanova's previous history of disastrous romantic relationships, such as her relationship with Talia Winters. Later, after a devastating attack on Ivanova and Cole's White Star during the battle to reclaim Earth from the tyrannical government of President Clark, Cole takes the severely injured Ivanova to Babylon 5. Using an alien execution device that takes one person's life-energy and transfers it to another, he sacrifices his life to save hers. His corpse is then preserved at Ivanova's request in cryogenic suspension in the hope that he might be revived in the future. This was actually not shown in the series, but in the credits of "Sleeping in Light". The credits showed each character as first and last seen.

Cole's story concludes in "Space, Time & the Incurable Romantic", a short story written by JMS and published in Amazing Stories #602. It takes place hundreds of years after the series ends. Cole is revived when the homeworld of those who built the life-energy transfer machine was found. He then proceeds to create a clone of Ivanova by enlisting one of Garibaldi's descendants to help him. Endowing it with her exact memories by stealing the scans done of her memory, he then strands her and himself on a lush, fertile and uncharted world with the intent of living "happily ever after" together. There are significant moral questions raised by his actions in this story, but JMS has been quoted as "wishing to give the character the happy ending he deserves" while at the same time raising the type of ethical question for which Babylon 5 is famous.

=== Na'Toth ===
Na'Toth is the aide to Narn Ambassador G'Kar. She was played by Julie Caitlin Brown in the first season. For the second season, Brown was replaced by Mary Kay Adams. Na'Toth was written out of the series after appearing in two more episodes. Brown returned to reprise the role in the fifth-season episode "A Tragedy of Telepaths". In The Babylon Files, a Babylon 5 guidebook, series creator Straczynski said he had considered having G'Kar have a "revolving-door" series of aides, akin to Murphy Brown.

Na'Toth was the second aide to G'Kar, after his first aide Ko'Dath died in an airlock accident. When Na'Toth arrived, a member of the Narn assassins' guild was attempting to kill G'Kar at the behest of an old rival. G'Kar was eventually kidnapped by the assassin. Na'Toth went to the assassin and claimed to be his backup. She was then able to disable the pain device that had been placed on G'Kar, allowing G'Kar to defeat the assassin, who left the station before the assassin guild had him killed.

Na'Toth went home to Narn at some point during the second season. She was on Narn when the Centauri used mass drivers to pluck asteroids out of orbit and bomb the Narn homeworld. Na'Toth was missing and presumed dead. In the fifth season, Na'Toth was found to be alive and imprisoned in the Centauri Royal Palace ("A Tragedy of Telepaths"). Londo Mollari and G'Kar smuggled her from the palace, and arranged for her to be sent back home to receive treatment for her injuries.

Na'Toth did not appear in any further Babylon 5 television episodes or movies. The short story “True Seeker”, published in the July 2000 issue 23 of The Official Babylon 5 Magazine, depicts Na'Toth as living on Narn in the winter of 2269 and enjoying a state of celebrity. The book Out of the Darkness by Peter David suggested that as of 2278 Na'Toth was still alive and living on Narn.

=== Zack Allan ===
Zack Allan was played by Jeff Conaway. He regularly appeared in the show from season 2 onward. During the second and third seasons of the series he was a security officer on the Babylon 5 station. In the fourth season, he was promoted to become Babylon 5's Security Chief and he retains that position through to the end of the series' fifth and final season.

Briefly in season 2 and 3, Allan was a member of Nightwatch, a civilian para-police force created by Earth Alliance President Morgan Clark to expose and arrest "traitors to Earth". True to form, Zack joined Nightwatch for the bonus pay they offered, without paying much attention to their political views and fascist nature. However, he had the truth of their nature driven home when a shopkeeper accused of sedition for publicly criticizing Clark's presidency was physically dragged away from his store and imprisoned by Nightwatch officers in the episode, "The Fall of Night". After this experience Zack agreed to help Babylon 5's command staff, eventually playing a critical role in "Point of No Return" in leading the bulk of the station's Nightwatch into a trap set up to capture them.

Allan was the second aide to B5 Chief of Security Michael Garibaldi from 2259 to 2261. Following Garibaldi's resignation as chief of security in season 4, Allan was appointed Chief of Security. He held the position for many years; except for a brief stint back on Earth, he remained there until the station was decommissioned in 2281. Because of this, he was the only one not to receive his invitation to Sheridan's farewell party in "Sleeping in Light", though Allan was still to meet Sheridan one more time as Sheridan took one last walk through the station.

In "Sleeping in Light", he walked with a noticeable limp, which has never been explained on screen. In the voiceover commentary of the episode, series creator J. Michael Straczynski explained that Zack was involved in heroic activity and lost his leg. In keeping with his previous experience with uniforms, it is suggested that the prosthetic he was supplied with never fitted correctly. Later in the episode, after the aged and abandoned Babylon 5 was destroyed and the Drakh influence on Centauri Prime was exposed and eliminated, Zack joined the Rangers and became Centauri Emperor Vir Cotto's assistant.

=== Lyta Alexander ===
Lyta Alexander was played by Patricia Tallman. Lyta was introduced in the pilot episode "The Gathering" as a telepath assigned to the Babylon 5 space station by the Psi Corps, a fictional organization providing support to telepaths and monitoring their activity. However, she did not appear in the remainder of Season One due to a dispute concerning Tallman's salary. Lyta's role in the series was largely taken up by Andrea Thompson, who was cast as Talia Winters, a telepath who took over Lyta's responsibilities in the station. After Thompson left the series due to disagreements regarding the amount of screen time given to her character, Lyta returned as a recurring character in Seasons Two and Three, after Capt. John Sheridan took over as station commander, and became a regular cast member from Season Four onward. Her character simply resumed the dramatic arc once intended for Thompson's.

In the series' pilot, she is described as a sixth-generation telepath, although she points out that telepathy may have been running in her family undetected even earlier, since telepaths were not monitored before that generation. In the series it is stated that Lyta was trained by the Psi Corps, and that she briefly interned with the Psi Cops division. After an incident whilst accompanying Alfred Bester, she transferred to commercial work. In 2257, she was assigned as Babylon 5's first commercial telepath. Soon after arriving at the station, she scanned Vorlon Ambassador Kosh, in violation of the wishes of the Vorlon government, in order to try to discover the identity of his attacker.

In Season Two, Lyta's experience with the Vorlon ambassador permanently changed her. She was recalled from her assignment a few weeks later and questioned regarding her encounter with Kosh. Interrogated for months by the Psi Corps, she eventually escaped and joined the Mars Resistance. While underground, she uncovered information regarding a mole among the Babylon 5 command staff, and returned to the station in late 2259 where she revealed Talia Winters as an unwitting mole for secret forces in EarthGov and Psi Corps. In season 3, Lyta travelled to the Vorlon homeworld, one of the few known humans to do so and live. There, she was modified by the Vorlons, given gill-like implants to allow her to breathe in a Vorlon environment, the ability to "carry" a Vorlon consciousness, and tremendously increased telepathic and psychokinetic powers. Even she did not initially realize the full potency of her new abilities. She returned to Babylon 5 as an aide to Ambassador Kosh.

In Season Four, Lyta was key to eventual resolution of the Shadow War on Coriana 6, serving as the vessel through which Sheridan and Delenn confronted the elder races and forced them to leave the galaxy. Immediately after the Shadow War, she was part of the expedition to the Shadows' homeworld of Z'ha'dum. Using unknown abilities and implanted instructions from the Vorlons, she triggered the destruction of the planet to spite Alfred Bester and to prevent Shadow technology from falling into the wrong hands. However, after the conclusion of the Shadow War, she found herself unwelcome and had difficulty finding employment. She would go on to play a decisive role in the end game of the Earth Civil War, triggering the Shadow-modified telepaths smuggled aboard Earth ships to disable the fleet at Mars.

In Season Five, Alexander became romantically involved with Byron, revealing to the telepaths that they had been created by the Vorlons as weapons for their war with the Shadows. After Byron's death, Alexander was inspired by his cause to create a homeworld for telepaths, and became the leader of a movement sponsoring violent resistance against the Corps. Lyta also began to more thoroughly explore the abilities the Vorlons had given her. She was eventually arrested for supporting terrorism aboard Babylon 5 by John Sheridan. Alexander then struck a deal with Michael Garibaldi to help her avoid prosecution, as well as provide funding for her cause. Former Narn Ambassador G'Kar took her with him on a mission of exploration.

Lyta does not appear in any of the canonical material released since the end of the series. It is strongly implied in Crusade and some of the canonical novels that her actions (both on Babylon 5 in 2262 and afterward) led to the Telepath War of the mid-2260s, in which she was killed. According to Straczynski, Lyta was intended to appear in the Crusade episode "The Path of Sorrows" as part of a flashback, but Tallman's salary could not be negotiated. The scene as aired featured an unnamed telepath who died striking against the Psi Corps. Whether or not this was intended to be Lyta, Straczynski confirmed Lyta did die in such an attack. In the aforementioned script book, Straczynski wrote that both Lyta and Lennier were killed in the explosion of Psi Corps Headquarters in a major battle of the Telepath War. Hints about her death had also been stated by Straczynski in posts to the Babylon 5 newsgroup, and in the final novel of the Psi Corps Trilogy by J. Gregory Keyes.

=== G'Kar ===
G'Kar is the Narn ambassador to Babylon 5 and was played by Andreas Katsulas in seasons 1–5. He makes his first appearance in The Gathering as a villainous diplomat opposite Londo Mollari, being constantly engaged in insidious, if petty and often comical schemes, usually driven by his hostility to his people's historical enemies, the Centauri, whom Londo represents. However, in the course of the series, he is transformed into a Messianic figure and the foremost spiritual leader of his people. The character last appears in Babylon 5: The Legend of the Rangers.

=== Londo Mollari ===
Londo Mollari was played by Peter Jurasik in seasons 1–5. As a member of one of the oldest Noble Houses of the Centauri Republic, he is the Centauri ambassador to Babylon 5. In the words of series creator J. Michael Straczynski, he is "overweight, prone to gambling constantly (null-pool is his favorite) and fond of women and drinks." At the start of the series, Londo seems to be ineffective in his role as ambassador. As the events of the Shadow War come to a peak, Mollari is promoted to the position of advisor on planetary security. Later, with Cartagia dead and a Vorlon fleet en route to destroy Centauri Prime, Mollari is promoted to the position of Prime Minister, making him temporarily head of state until a new Emperor can be elected. Following the galactic war with the Shadows, Mollari eventually rises to become Emperor of the Centauri Republic, taking the title Emperor Mollari II, since another member of his family was Emperor in the past.

== Earth Alliance ==
The Earth Alliance was a major galactic superpower in the Babylon 5 universe. The name of its military force is EarthForce. Earth Alliance had gained more technology than any other race in the known Babylon 5 universe: Dilgar, Narn, Centauri, Shadow, Minbari, and Vorlon tech all at one point in time.

It was founded at the end of the twenty-first century, after the Third World War: first as a loose coalition of nations, then as a tight alliance of nearly every nation on Earth as well as Alliance-controlled colonies throughout the Galaxy, though colonial populations have had a history of independence-driven rebellion, especially Mars. The Alliance is a unicameral representative democracy under the leadership of an elected president with a strong military. In one second-season episode ("And Now For a Word"), the Alliance is said to consist of 24 outposts and colonies in over a dozen solar systems.

Since the end of the Earth-Minbari War, the Alliance had prospered in interstellar trade, though some influential factions had become increasingly xenophobic and isolationist. Following the assassination of President Luis Santiago, the new president, Morgan Clark, formed Nightwatch (a pervasive secret police) and dissolved the Senate, turning Earth and her colonies into a totalitarian fascist state. Clark's changes are reversed in the fourth season after the Earth Alliance Civil War leads to his suicide in the face of his inevitable overthrow, restoring democracy.

=== Ari Ben Zayn ===
Colonel Ari Ben Zayn (Gregory Martin) is an EarthForce Intelligence officer who investigated Commander Jeffrey Sinclair and his command staff in the Babylon 5 episode "Eyes".

Colonel Ben Zayn's investigation was one of several conducted by Earth Force Internal Affairs as the events on Mars were putting the command staff of colonies and stations in question. Ben Zayn's interest was not of investigation, but one of asserting control as he was passed over for command of Babylon 5 in favour of Sinclair by the Minbari, which did not sit well with Ben Zayn.

Ben Zayn's true intentions were discovered by his Psi Corps Military Specialist Harriman Gray, as Ben Zayn is a close friend of Psi Corps official Alfred Bester. He was defeated by Gray and Sinclair and sent back to Earth for investigation into his activities.

=== William Morgan Clark ===
William Morgan Clark is a major antagonist portrayed by Gary McGurk. His character rarely appeared on-screen, but is a major off-screen presence in the show.

Clark became president when EarthForce One, carrying President Luis Santiago, was destroyed in 2258. He was complicit with the assassination, to take office. He believed Earth to be in danger of being overrun by extraterrestrial races and so the Nightwatch, a fascist, paramilitary organization, was formed to find out people suspected to be alien infiltrators or sympathizers. EarthForce's Chairman of the Joint Chiefs of Staff, General William Hague, suspected that Clark was involved in the assassination, and began a low-level counter-conspiracy that included Captain John Sheridan. In 2260, John Sheridan and General Hague found evidence that Clark had arranged the assassination of Santiago. Hague managed to get the evidence introduced in the Senate, which caused an uproar. At about the same time, it was revealed that Clark's forces had found a Shadow vessel buried on Ganymede. Clark was having the ship studied to learn its secrets. John Sheridan took the White Star back to Ganymede, and destroyed the vessel. Clark soon issued a decree of martial law using the Ganymede incident as a pretext.

When martial law was declared, Hague began armed resistance against Clark's government. Hague was soon killed in a firefight between his ship, EAS Alexander and the heavy cruiser EAS Clarkstown. Mars rejected martial law, and Clark responded by bombing Mars. Clark dissolved the Senate, and nationalized the media outlets. In response, Proxima III and Orion VII broke away from the Earth Alliance, setting up as independent states. Babylon 5 broke away in "Severed Dreams", after Clark tried to seize the station and put it under command of the Nightwatch. Clark quickly turned the Earth Alliance into a dictatorship, making Interstellar Network News (ISN) into a propaganda machine. Considering Sheridan to be a threat, Clark targeted Babylon 5 and Sheridan specifically with a blockade and a propaganda war ("The Illusion of Truth").

In the fall of 2261, Clark began killing refugees trying to leave the colonies that he was taking military action against. When Sheridan learned that in one case 10,000 civilians were killed by an Earth Alliance vessel, he realized that the time had come to remove Clark. After the Shadow War, Sheridan had built a powerful alliance of races and held command of the White Star Fleet, giving him the military muscle to fight Earth directly. Sheridan's forces began a systematic campaign against Clark's forces, including a televised message of their own dubbed the "Voice of the Resistance". Many Earth Force personnel defected, and Sheridan scored his first victory against Clark by defeating his forces blockading Proxima III. Sheridan was captured by his former chief of security Michael Garibaldi (who had been brainwashed by Alfred Bester) and tortured but was rescued and returned to the fleet soon afterwards, which by this time had grown to include a large number of Earth Force ships fighting alongside him.

Clark decided to trap Sheridan's forces with advanced model destroyers which had been fitted with Shadow technology. When Sheridan's second in command, Commander Susan Ivanova, learned of this, she engaged the destroyers with White Star ships, leaving the rest of the EarthForce vessels behind. Captain James of EAS Agamemnon opposed Ivanova's decision, but soon realized that Clark would have his destroyers target the Earth ships rather than the White Stars. While Ivanova managed to destroy all the vessels, her White Star was severely damaged by a collision with debris from one of the destroyed vessels and she was injured and near-dead.

Eventually, Sheridan took the fleet directly to Earth, and sends a message saying that they had come home to fight against Clark's tyranny. Realizing that he would soon be captured, Clark committed suicide with a PPG. In one last vindictive act, he turned the planetary defense grid back on the Earth under a "scorched earth" policy – the parallels with Adolf Hitler's end and final policies at the end of World War II are notable. Sheridan and his forces destroyed the defense platforms before they fired; Sheridan was prepared to ram the final platform (targeting North America's eastern seaboard) with his badly damaged ship, but EAS Apollo (previously fighting against Sheridan) appeared, then destroyed the platform and saved Sheridan's life ("Endgame").

During his presidency, Clark accused others of being traitors to the Earth Alliance and humanity, even though he arranged the assassination of his predecessor President Santiago so he could assume office and turn Earth into a fascist police state. He pursued a massive Orwellian propaganda smear campaign to present any who opposed him as traitors to humanity. He tried to kill everyone on Earth rather than let it fall to opposition forces. After Clark's suicide, footage of his body was shown on an ISN broadcast to confirm his death: someone had unceremoniously hung a taunting handwritten note around his corpse's neck, which read "Traitor to Earth". Clark had done more to undermine and destroy the Earth Alliance than the fictitious "alien conspiracy" he scapegoated to seize power. After Clark's suicide, Senator Susanna Luchenko of the Russian Consortium was named president. President Luchenko announced that the Justice Department would prosecute those who had committed crimes during Clark's reign of terror and offered amnesty to those who had followed Sheridan.

=== David Corwin ===
David Corwin (Josh Coxx) is a C&C (Command and Control, or Observation Dome) worker. The character appears in seasons one through five, Thirdspace and The River of Souls. First credited as "Tech #1" he becomes Lt. JG David Corwin. He is later promoted to full lieutenant. He occasionally fills in for the lack of a second in command in season five (see also B5 government). In River of Souls, which takes place after the station is returned to Earth Alliance jurisdiction, it is implied that he has been officially made XO. He is named for Norman Corwin.

=== Richard Franklin ===
General Richard Franklin (Paul Winfield) is an EarthForce general. His sole screen appearance was in the episode "Gropos". Richard Franklin is the father of Babylon 5's chief of medical staff, Doctor Stephen Franklin. The relationship between father and son is strained, due to the General's Human-centric beliefs. Richard Franklin was often away from home as Stephen was raised.

Franklin is the commander of the Earth Alliance 356th Infantry Division and is known by the nicknames "Old Firestorm", "Hero of the Canal Wars", "Scourge of Janos 7" and "Liberator of the African Block".

=== General William Hague ===
General William Hague (Robert Foxworth) is chairman of EarthForce's Joint Chiefs of Staff and the first leader of the resistance against the authoritarian regime of Earth Alliance President Morgan Clark. Hague was able to escape the Sol system on board the EAS Alexander. EarthForce ships that remained loyal to Hague were hunted down and destroyed leaving only the Alexander. Hague was killed shortly after in a firefight with the EAS Clarkstown. He was replaced as the leader of the resistance by Captain John Sheridan.

Foxworth portrays Hague in two episodes as a supporting role for John Sheridan as a contact in the underground resistance against Morgan Clark. Many of the characters mention his name on referring to the sub-arc regarding the resistance which lends importance to Hague's role offscreen.

=== General Robert Lefcourt ===
General Robert Lefcourt was portrayed by actor J. Patrick McCormack.

General Lefcourt first appeared in Babylon 5: In the Beginning where he and another Earth Alliance official quizzed ambassador Londo Mollari about the Minbari. Despite being warned by Mollari to send only one ship to make contact with the Minbari lest they are perceived as a threat, Lefcourt brashly asserted that the Earth Alliance had taken care of the Dilgar and it could take care of the Minbari as well. Mollari commented that this attitude was both arrogant and stupid; however, he did give all information that the Centauri held about the Minbari.

Despite Mollari's warning, General Lefcourt decided to send a small task force to the border of Minbari space. The expedition was led by the EAS Prometheus under the command of Captain Michael Jankowski, a reckless and unpopular commanding officer infamous for his poor handling of first contact situations. The task force unexpectedly encountered three Minbari warships, one of which contained the Grey Council. Jankowski initially refused to jump back into hyperspace, preferring to wait to the last moment so they could get as much information on the Minbari ships as possible. By the time Jankowski decided to jump the Earth ship's jump engines had been accidentally disabled by the Minbari. He then misinterpreted the meaning of the Minbari ships opening their gunports and panicked, ordering his ships to open fire. When the Minbari leader Dukhat was killed it led to the opening of hostilities between the Minbari and the Earth Alliance.

Following this General Lefcourt and General Fontaine appear to lead EarthForce's losing effort against the Minbari. The pair are shown briefing EarthForce personnel after the initial Minbari attacks and again later when they show replays of Commander John Sheridan's victory over the Minbari flagship the Drala'Fi (Black Star). Following this he gives Sheridan and Dr Stephen Franklin a mission to meet with a Minbari representative on a neutral planet to discuss peace. He tells Sheridan in no uncertain terms that if the Minbari want Earth's surrender then he is to give them it, to ensure the survival of the human race.

Thirteen years after the end of the Earth-Minbari war the Earth Alliance had slipped into civil war with the now Captain John Sheridan leading a rebellion against the authoritarian regime of Earth Alliance President, Morgan Clark. Sheridan's fleet manages to overcome all EarthForce resistance before mounting an attack on the Sol System. General Lefcourt is selected by Clark to command a fleet of 35 Omega class destroyers who make their stand at Mars. He is selected not because of any particular loyalty to Clark but because of his belief that soldiers should not take up arms against their own government no matter the cause.

Sheridan was also a pupil of his at the EarthForce academy and it was thought that he would know his tactics best. Taking command of the EAS Apollo he dismissed the ground attacks by the Mars resistance and a single White Star commanded by Marcus Cole as a diversion and refused to allow his fleet to turn back to take them on. Minutes later most of Lefcourt's fleet is disabled by Shadow altered telepaths and the rest are put out of action by Sheridan's White Star fleet.

Security aboard the Apollo soon find and eliminate the telepath onboard but the ship remains adrift. General Lefcourt threatens the engineering crew to get the ship under control and when they finally manage to do so he orders them to Earth in pursuit of Sheridan's fleet. The Apollo made a timely arrival, and President Clark - in a final vindictive act before committing suicide - had ordered the planetary defence grid to fire on Earth.

Sheridan's fleet managed to destroy all the platforms except one. With it about to fire on the North American seaboard, the EAS Agamemnon under Captain Sheridan's command was the only ship in range able to destroy it. The Agamemnon's weapon systems were inoperative, however, and Sheridan ordered the Agamemnon to ram the platform. Seconds before it would have. the Apollo exits hyperspace and destroys the final platform, General Lefcourt then welcomes Captain Sheridan home.

=== Jack ===
Jack was Michael Garibaldi's aide (Macaulay Bruton, who also portrays the character Tragedy in Season One "Eyes"), a recurring character in Seasons One and Two of Babylon 5. He is both implicated in, and explicitly involved in, events that lead to the death of Earth Alliance President Luis Santiago, and the "coming darkness."

Perhaps most powerfully, he shoots Garibaldi in the back at the end of Season One ("Chrysalis"), preventing Garibaldi from warning Sinclair in time about the assassination attempt on Santiago, resulting in it being successful. In the Season Two episode "Revelations", Garibaldi regains consciousness, and with the help of Talia Winters, Talia helps Garibaldi telepathically retrieve his memory of being shot, and sees Jack's reflection in a mirror. Jack is arrested by Lou Welch & station security, but President Clark personally contacts Captain Sheridan, and orders Sheridan to have Jack sent back to Earth. En route to Earth, the transport carrying Jack and all of the evidence regarding Garibaldi's attempted murder, is intercepted by a second unknown EarthForce transport (later found out to have been sent by President Clark's agents) and taken away to safety; his ultimate fate is unknown.

Jack had connections with Psi Cop Alfred Bester & Psi Corps, as Jack was contacted telepathically by Bester & later gave Garibaldi the same salute that Bester gave Commander Sinclair in Season One "Mind War".

=== Susanna Luchenko ===
Susanna Luchenko (Beata Pozniak) becomes the president of the Earth Alliance following the overthrow and suicide of President Morgan Clark. She plays a key role in ending Clark's oppressive policies, including ending his martial law decree, and restoring democracy to the Earth Alliance. Luchenko had previously represented the Russian Consortium in the Earth Senate.

When she became President of the Earth Alliance, she appealed to the people of the Alliance to remain calm, and not to resort to committing acts of revenge against members of Clark's regime. She asked that people "listen to the better angels of their nature." Luchenko said that the courts and legal system would investigate and prosecute those who committed crimes during Clark's presidency.

When it was learned that the Drakh were preparing to destroy Earth, Captain Elizabeth Lochley of Babylon 5 persuaded Luchenko to send a large fleet to confront the Drakh. Even though the Shadow's planet killer the Drakh brought to destroy Earth was itself destroyed, the Drakh were able to successfully seed Earth's atmosphere with biological weapons. The weapons would kill every living thing on Earth in five years. Sheridan offered his support, and the full resources of the Interstellar Alliance to help combat the Drakh plague. At some point within the next few years the Excalibur was able to find a cure for the plague.

Her only appearance is in the fourth-season episode "Rising Star", although her name is mentioned in a number of fifth-season episodes.

=== Benjamin Kyle ===
Doctor Benjamin Kyle was portrayed by Johnny Sekka. His only appearance was in the Babylon 5 pilot movie The Gathering. Kyle was a xenobiologist who was chosen by Commander Jeffrey Sinclair for assignment to Babylon 5 in 2257. He was given responsibility for Babylon 5 medical department and labs. He was aboard the station when an assassination attempt was made on Ambassador Kosh. Kyle was one of few humans to see a Vorlon firsthand when he was forced to open the encounter suit of Ambassador Kosh, while working to save the Vorlon dignitary's life. Kyle was subsequently reassigned to Earth by the Earth Alliance President to work as an expert on alien physiology. Dr. Stephen Franklin was assigned to Babylon 5 to assume the medical duties. He eventually assumed the position of head of Xenobiological Research at EarthDome. When he retired in 2262, he was again replaced by Dr. Stephen Franklin.

=== Lou Welch ===
Lou Welch (David L. Crowley) is a member of the station's security force. He served for several years on board Babylon 5, and was one of Michael Garibaldi's close friends. His first appearance was in the first-season episode "Survivors." He appears in several early Babylon 5 episodes, until his last on-screen appearance in the second-season episode "Gropos." (This is approximately the same time that the character of Zack Allan was introduced into the show.) Reintroduced in the novels, Lou Welch later dies on Centauri Prime when he is murdered by the Prime Candidates and the Drakh after being caught using a changeling net to gather information on Vir Cotto's behalf.

=== Luis Santiago ===
President Luis Santiago (still photo of Douglas Netter) was President of the Earth Alliance at the beginning of the series. His openness to peaceful relationships with alien races contrasts with that of Vice President Clark, who hid his xenophobic views until he became president after Santiago's assassination in 2259.

When Santiago was elected no one had doubts as to his Genevan expertise as he had already served as vice president under President Elizabeth Levy during the tumultuous Earth-Minbari War. After serving at least one term, Santiago was re-elected in 2258, defeating challenger Marie Crane. Santiago had strong policies on opening trade relations and discussions with alien races and fully supported the efforts of the space station Babylon 5. While some saw this as a good thing, Vice-president Clark secretly opposed this viewpoint and once he was in power began a propaganda war to increase xenophobic views of the Earth Alliance.

Susan Ivanova comments during his reelection campaign that she does not intend to vote for Santiago because she believes a leader should have a strong chin, which Santiago lacks.

He was approximately one year into his second term at the time of his assassination aboard EarthForce One, the Babylon 5 equivalent of Air Force One, at the beginning of 2259. The incident occurs near the jump point off Io, one of Jupiter's moons. An energy problem with EarthForce One's jump engines is registered and the craft explodes live on ISN (the CNN of Babylon 5's universe). A slight suspicion of foul play is hinted at by the ISN feed. The newscaster comments that the president is late making his New Years speech moments before the incident. Whether this is because an incident has already occurred on EarthForce One, with the explosion of the craft to cover any evidence, is unknown though it is later discovered Clark arranged the incident with help from The Shadows.

== Psi Corps ==
The Psi Corps is an agency of the Earth Alliance responsible for all humans with telepathic or other para-psychological abilities anywhere within Earth-controlled space. All persons with Psi abilities are required to either join the Corps, face lifetime imprisonment, or submit to a lifetime of drug treatments to suppress their abilities. Prolonged treatment with these drugs has a depressing effect. Psi Cops are members of a para-military body enforcing laws related to telepaths and operates with few checks against their authority.

The Corps was originally established to protect, nurture and train humans with Psi abilities and to protect the mundane population from possible abuse or criminal activities by talented individuals. The Psi Corps' headquarters has hospitals, offices and a boarding school where young people possessing telepathic and telekinetic power (known colloquially in the series as teeps and teeks) can develop without the fear and persecution they would face among the normal population (referred to by psychics in the series as mundanes).

At some point the Corps realized that it could not be controlled by any external authority and developed into a fascist state-within-a-state, pursuing its own agenda using the Psi Cops and other means, taking an active role in Earth politics. By the time of the pilot movie, Babylon 5: The Gathering, the Corps has degenerated to the point where many potential and former members prefer a life on-the-run as rogue psychics (referred to by the Corps as blips) to the safety and comfort of living and working under its wing.

After the colony on Babylon 5 was forced to leave, Lyta Alexander began a crusade against the Psi Corps. Her actions led to a war in which rogue telepaths and non-telepaths fought the Psi Corps. The old Psi Corps was destroyed, and a new Psionic Monitoring Commission was built to replace it. Once the Telepath War was over, the Psionic Monitoring Commission dedicated itself to hunting down those members of the Corps who committed war crimes, such as Alfred Bester. Bester was eventually captured and sentenced to spend the rest of his life in prison with his abilities taken away by drugs. Many private schools were founded to educate telepaths; they met with mixed success. Telepaths were allowed a much wider range of options as far as their lives were concerned. Rather than having to join the Psi Corps, they were able to do almost anything they wanted. This included joining the Earth Alliance military and working for private organizations.

=== Alfred Bester ===
Alfred Bester (played by Walter Koenig) is a senior Psi Cop and a recurring antagonist in the series. J. Michael Straczynski named the character after science fiction writer Alfred Bester, since telepathy is a recurring theme in his work (most notably The Demolished Man, which may have inspired the Psi Corps and the "death of personality" legal punishment in the Babylon 5 universe).

When Bester first appeared in the series, he was in pursuit of a powerful telepath named Jason Ironheart, who had been the victim of illegal genetic and drug experiments by the Psi Corps in an attempt to create a powerful supertelepath. Bester didn't get along with the command staff, which would be a recurring plot element throughout the series.

Bester eventually agreed to work with Captain John Sheridan at several points during the Shadow War particularly after the Shadows captured someone close to Bester. After Michael Garibaldi was captured during an attack by the Shadows on the station, Bester was able to secretly recover and capture him in turn. Bester had become aware of an anti-telepath conspiracy, and decided to use Garibaldi to expose it. Bester subjected him to subtle reprogramming in order to use him as a sleeper agent. He exploited Garibaldi's inherent traits of paranoia and distrust of authority, correctly believing that the conspiracy would view Garibaldi as a prime recruit once alienated from his friends and work.

The wealthy industrialist William Edgars, the plot's mastermind, believed that a civil war among humanity would be counterproductive no matter how totalitarian the current regime. Edgars insisted that Garibaldi draw out Sheridan before he would bring Garibaldi fully into his confidence. Garibaldi, not suspecting why he was so driven to find out the innermost secrets of the plot, betrayed Sheridan to agents of the corrupt President Clark. Edgars revealed that his pharmaceutical company, Edgars Industries, had perfected a lethal virus which would attack telepaths' unique genes. Any infected telepath would quickly die without regular doses of the antidote they had also created. This would reduce telepaths to a slave race and avert the war which many normals and telepaths believed loomed on the horizon. After learning this, Garibaldi entered a fugue state, and alerted Bester and the Psi Corps. Bester came to Garibaldi, still locked in his robotic paralysis, and revealed the details of the brainwashing and the deception. Although tempted to kill Garibaldi, Bester instead removed the commands and left Garibaldi to cope with the realization that he had betrayed everyone he knew on all sides. The Corps murdered William Edgars and captured the only known samples of the virus and antidote.

It was later revealed that, even with the programming removed, Bester had left in place an 'Asimov', a type of mental block - adapted from the first of Isaac Asimov's Three Laws of Robotics (Bester stated that it had been adapted from the first two of Asimov's laws, but his explanation covered only the first law) - knowing that Garibaldi would likely murder him on sight if not prevented from doing so. Lyta Alexander eventually agreed to remove the block from Garibaldi's mind, once he had helped her destroy the Psi Corps.

Following the Telepath War, Alfred Bester was wanted for war crimes that he committed. He was planned to appear in the Crusade episode "Value Judgments", written by Fiona Avery, on the run from the authorities and being sought by Garibaldi's agents. The episode would have shown him encountering the crew of the Excalibur, who require a powerful telepath to open a lock that responds to powerful telepathy. The episode would have ended with him escaping once again.

Bester's origin story is established in the "Psi Corps Trilogy" of novels by J. Gregory Keyes, written after the end of the series and considered part of the canon. He was born Stephen Kevin Dexter, the son of Matthew and Fiona, leaders of a telepath resistance to the Psi Corps who were killed when he was an infant. He was adopted by the Corps and given his name by the Psi Corps director, an admirer of the author. As he became a prominent Psi Cop, Bester discovered the truth about his parents and their deaths from his godfather, Stephen Walters. In a rage, he gunned down Walters; his left hand remained tightly gripping the weapon, explaining why Bester's left hand was always clenched in a fist on the series. After the Telepath War, he spent several years on the run before moving to Paris, where he fell in love with a local businesswoman named Louise. Michael Garibaldi was relentless in his pursuit, and eventually tracked him down. Bester was brought before the war crimes tribunal and was tried in France for his crimes. He was sentenced to life in prison and subjected to the Sleeper drugs that deprived him of his telepathic abilities. During that time, a statue was made of his birth parents and the boy he had been before becoming "Alfred Bester". He spent the next 10 years in a maximum-security prison, and died shortly after the death of John Sheridan in 2281. The day before his death, he finally accepted that he was indeed the 'lost child' of Matthew and Fiona Dexter, and his left fist finally reopened as a result. Even in death, Garibaldi pursued him. After Bester's funeral, Garibaldi went to the gravesite and hammered a wooden stake into the ground above Bester's coffin. This amused a departing watcher, who was fully aware of what Bester had done and been in life.

=== Jason Ironheart ===
Jason Ironheart (William Allen Young) appeared in the first-season episode "Mind War".

Ironheart is a former lover of Talia Winters when they were in the Psi Corps together. He volunteered for experimental treatments to enhance his telepathy, and to produce stable telekinetics. The experiments succeeded, but caused Ironheart's powers to increase to an uncontrollable level. He fled from Psi Corps to Babylon 5 where he set up an escape route for other rogue telepaths, but was pursued by Bester.

Ironheart began to undergo destructive "mindquakes", releasing bursts of psychokinetic energy so powerful they threatened the station. As Ironheart realized that his abilities had grown too great to contain, he discorporated his physical form, but not before leaving Talia with a gift; enhanced telepathic shields, and even a bit of telekinesis of her own. He then turns to Sinclair and says, "Goodbye Commander. I will see you again, in a million years." (This is a reference to the final episode of the fourth season.)

=== Byron Gordon ===
Byron Gordon was played by Robin Atkin Downes. He was introduced in the season 5 episode "No Compromises" as a strong telepath (P12 rating). Byron is shown arriving on the Babylon 5 station with a large contingent of rogue telepaths early in the year 2262. At this stage Byron is portrayed as a Gandhi-like figure; a leader of telepaths who seeks freedom from the Psi Corps and from mundanes, but would do so only through passive resistance/physically non-violent means, though he does show himself to be mentally violent, using intimidation and blackmail against members of the alliance. In "The Paragon of Animals", Byron helps the new Interstellar Alliance by revealing treachery by the Drazi against the Enphili. John Sheridan offers Byron and his telepaths political asylum at Babylon 5. They are allowed to establish a small colony in Brown 3.

In his early appearances in Season 5, Byron is shown as trying to maintain distance from conflict between his telepaths and the aggressive mundanes from "Down Below", the Psi Corps, and from being used as tools by the Interstellar Alliance. Key disputes come between Byron and Michael Garibaldi over his wish to employ Byron's telepaths as spies ("The Paragon of Animals" (episode 3)), and between the telepaths and the Earth Force/Psi Corps over their rogue status ("Strange Relations" (episode 6)). Ultimately, Byron agrees for two of his people to serve the Alliance, and Elizabeth Lochley negotiates for the telepaths to remain temporarily on the station.

It is later revealed in "Secrets of the Soul" (episode 7) that Byron had trained with the Psi Corps. In fact, he had interned with the Psi Cops and was the protégé of the famous/infamous Alfred Bester. This later episode also revealed that he was part of Bester's elite Black Omega squadron, and had deserted after receiving orders to fire upon defenseless mundanes (non-telepaths).

The Psi Corps Trilogy books by Gregory Keyes expand on this apparent crisis of conscience a little. Byron and his ship appear to have crashed or been lost around Venus, but this turns out to be a ruse to effect his desertion without raising suspicions.

A second major shift in Byron's outlook occurs in as the result of a romantic relationship with telepath Lyta Alexander that evolves over several episodes of the television series. Lyta and Byron find comfort and acceptance in each other, however intimate moments ("Secrets of the Soul" (episode 7)) eventually unlock secrets of the Vorlons hidden deep within Lyta's mind. It is revealed to Byron that the Vorlons had generated telepaths as weapons in their war against the Shadows. Byron is shown as angered by this. As the Vorlons are no longer around to be blamed, he decides that the remaining races who had been "saved" by telepaths owe him and his people a new homeland. Furthermore, from comments of his in "The Paragon of Animals" and other episodes, it is clear that in his own way, he despises mundanes just as much as Bester does.

In "In the Kingdom of the Blind" (episode 9), Byron threatens the members of the Interstellar Alliance with the revelation of their deepest secrets. The aim of this exercise is increased leverage to further his and his followers' goal of a new telepath homeworld. However, Byron's mental intimidation merely caused conflicts to rapidly escalate, and the Psi Corps is called in to arrest Byron and his followers. While many remained with Byron in a starvation protest sealed in their colony, a group of renegades take a more aggressive stance attacking station personnel and seizing hostages. Amongst the hostages are Garibaldi and Dr Franklin.

In a story arc carried over several episodes ("A Tragedy of Telepaths" (episode 10)-"Phoenix Rising" (episode 11)) Byron is portrayed as distraught over killing in his name; this is not how he wanted the battle to be fought. With the aid of Lyta Alexander, he is able to free the hostages and kill the leader of the renegade telepaths. He surrenders under the condition that those who did not take part in the violence would be freed; the renegades and himself would turn themselves in to station security. While these terms are agreed to by Sheridan, the appearance of Alfred Bester during the surrender precipitates a shooting battle, during which many telepaths and security members are killed. Byron, not wanting to return to Psi Corps, fires into a chemical leak, causing an explosion and turning himself and the other renegades into martyrs.

In the aftermath shown at the end of "Phoenix Rising", Lyta Alexander takes over Byron's mission for a telepath homeland or homeworld, and she becomes the leader of the telepath resistance.

The actions of Byron's more aggressive followers along with Alfred Bester's own violence against them arguably form the opening moves of the Telepath War.

== Miscellaneous humans ==
=== William Edgars ===
William Edgars (Efrem Zimbalist, Jr.) is the founder and CEO of Edgars Industries, the fourth-largest Earth megacorporation and largest pharmaceutical research company on Mars. One of the richest men in the Earth Alliance, Edgars was a powerful member of the plutocracy that held great influence over EarthGov policy. With this influence threatened by President Clark's regime and its empowerment of the Psi Corps, Edgars conspired to gain a means of control over telepaths, and to ultimately neutralize them if necessary. He acquired a leftover Shadow-tech biological weapon through the black market, and developed it into a virus that infects telepaths, killing them unless they regularly take an antidote also produced by Edgars Industries. This plot was foiled and Edgars was murdered by the Psi Corps after the conspiracy was discovered by Michael Garibaldi, acting as an unwilling infiltration agent. William Edgars is survived by his wife, Lise Hampton, who is the sole known inheritor of his estate.

=== Lise Hampton ===
Lise Hampton (Denise Gentile) is Michael Garibaldi's love interest. She appears in seasons one through five. She is also known as Lise Hampton-Edgars and Lise Hampton-Edgars-Garibaldi. She first appears in part two of "A Voice in the Wilderness".

Lise Hampton first met Garibaldi when he was stationed on Mars during the Earth-Minbari War; the pair began an on/off relationship that lasted until Garibaldi accepted the post of Chief of Security aboard Babylon 5. During the Mars Rebellion, Garibaldi becomes concerned about Lise's safety, and learns she has been injured during a riot; Garibaldi is heartbroken when he finds out Lise has married a man named Franz. Lise and Franz later divorce, and Lise marries wealthy industrialist William Edgars, founder and owner of Edgars Industries. When Edgars is murdered by Psi Corps, Lise inherits Edgars Industries, but goes on the run and turns to the Martian underworld for protection; the criminals take Lise hostage for ransom instead. Garibaldi and a group of Rangers rescue Lise.

After the end of the Earth Alliance Civil War, Lise and Garibaldi are married and take joint ownership of Edgars Industries. A rogue faction of Edgars Industries executives hire an assassin to kill Lise and Garibaldi, but Garibaldi learns who is responsible and takes revenge.

In the series finale, "Sleeping in Light", Garibaldi and Lise are still happily married and have a teenage daughter named Mary.

=== Brother Theo ===
Brother Theo is the leader of a group of Roman Catholic monks living on Babylon 5, who appear in a few episodes of season three.

Brother Theo and his order of Cistercian Trappist monks (from New Melleray Abbey) first come to the station in the episode "Convictions". The group of monks wish to learn more about the varied aliens and their beliefs, and support that work by offering their services as computer experts and engineers. With permission from Church officials and the Babylon 5 command staff, they take up residence in the station. Brother Theo and his monks quickly prove their value when they help review security camera footage to catch a bomber who terrorized residents on the station.

Next, Brother Theo appears in the episode "Passing Through Gethsemane", when he manages to soundly beat John Sheridan in a game of chess. Sheridan is introduced to Brother Edward (Brad Dourif) during the course of the game. Soon, Theo becomes concerned about Brother Edward when the monk begins reporting hearing voices and having flashbacks. Theo, not knowing too much about Edward's past, asks Sheridan and Garibaldi to look into his past. But at the same time Theo is doing the same, and before too long it is learned that Edward was actually the "Black Rose Killer," a serial killer who preyed on women. After being convicted of the crimes, Edward had his mind wiped, and after being presumed dead in a fire had come to the Order with a new personality designed to want to serve society. The families of the victims of the "Black Rose Killer" are not satisfied, and want revenge. Using a Centauri telepath and the intercom system, they manage to break down the memory blocks, and one of the family members mortally wounds Edward. Before dying, Brother Edward is granted absolution by Brother Theo. After the trial and conviction of Brother Edward's killer, Theo takes the newly-mind-wiped man into the order as Brother Malcolm, having forgiven him for killing Edward.

Brother Theo's final appearance was in the episode "And the Rock Cried Out, No Hiding Place". After the station broke away from the Earth Alliance the monks remained on Babylon 5. Brother Theo had helped set up an intelligence network with other religious leaders, and helped bring several of them to Babylon 5 (under the pretext of a conference) to help smuggle this intelligence to the station's command staff.

=== Anna Sheridan ===
Anna Sheridan (Beth Toussaint then Melissa Gilbert) was John Sheridan's wife. She served as a crew member aboard the Icarus, an Interplanetary Expeditions ship that set down on Z'ha'dum approximately two years before John Sheridan's assignment to Babylon 5. The Icarus and all hands were believed lost at some point during the expedition. In fact, the crew came into contact with the awakening Shadows and at least some crew were "changed" to suit the Shadows' needs. John Sheridan believed himself partly responsible for her accepting a position on the Icarus and thus for her death as well.

In 2260, Anna, who had up until that point been used as the living control center of a Shadow vessel, was extracted and sent by the Shadows (under their control) to Babylon 5 to lure John Sheridan to Z'ha'dum. Both traveled there in the White Star. Anna died (again) at Z'ha'dum when John Sheridan remotely activated the White Star, causing it to fall toward the Shadow compound, and then detonated two high-yield nuclear weapons (500 megatons each) on board the ship.

=== David Sheridan ===
David Sheridan was the son of the Interstellar Alliance President John Sheridan and his wife Delenn. Sheridan was named after his paternal grandfather David Sheridan. He did not appear in any of the Babylon 5 television episodes or made-for-television movies, but was featured in Out of the Darkness, the third novel in the canon Legions of Fire novel series.

His existence was first established in the two-part "War Without End" episode from the third season of Babylon 5 when his father traveled forward in time briefly and was told by Delenn that they had a son. This foreshadowing served to alter the tone of the relationship between Sheridan and Delenn, which was at that point still developing. It also served as part of the motivation for Sheridan's actions at the end of the third season, which in turn resolved many of the major plotlines thus far in the show. The final episode of season four, "The Deconstruction of Falling Stars" contains a reference to an incident involving David, in a segment set one hundred years later, but does not detail the nature of this.

Toward the end of the fifth and final season of Babylon 5, Delenn finally became pregnant with him. His birth takes place off-camera between the penultimate episode, "Objects at Rest", and the final episode, "Sleeping in Light", set some 19 years later. In "Sleeping in Light", we learn that David was in training with the Rangers at the time of his father's death. That was after the resolution of the trap set for him and his parents by the Drakh, who used Mollari as their unwilling agent.

According to the DVD commentary for the final episode of Babylon 5, "Sleeping in Light," Straczynski decided not to have David Sheridan appear in that episode, partly because he hadn't figured out how he wanted David to look, and partly because he feared that debuting an important character would detract from the story he wanted to tell in that episode.

David Sheridan finally appeared in the Peter David novel Out of the Darkness as a main character, where he brings his story full circle by, under the control of the evil Drakh, luring his parents to Centauri Prime, thus creating the situation that his father stumbled into in "War Without End", and explaining the reference in "Deconstruction of Falling Stars". David is saved when the Drakh controlling him is killed, thus causing David's Keeper to wither and die.

=== Catherine Sakai ===
Catherine Sakai (Julia Nickson-Soul, credited as Julia Nickson) is the love interest of Commander Jeffrey Sinclair in the first-season episodes "The Parliament of Dreams", "Mind War" and "Chrysalis". The two have a long on-again, off-again relationship, though at the end of "Chrysalis" they announce their engagement.

Sakai is an independent planet surveyor and operates the survey ship "Skydancer". G'Kar warns her against surveying Sigma 957, but she does not take his advice. She then becomes one of the first humans to come across the "First Ones", who make their home there. Her ship is damaged, and her death imminent, but she is rescued by a ship sent by G'Kar.

In the canonical novel "To Dream in the City of Sorrows", we learn that Sakai has joined the Rangers. During a mission with them, she disappears into a time rift. It's suggested in that novel that her disappearance was one of the reasons Sinclair went back in time with Babylon 4.

=== Morden ===
Morden was played by Ed Wasser. He is a recurring antagonist in the show and is arguably the face of the primary villains of the series during its first four seasons, as he often manipulates the series' other characters for the Shadows' sinister purposes.

Morden serves as the spokesman on behalf of the Shadows, an ancient and incredibly powerful alien race whom he refers to as his "associates." Although outwardly polite and gracious, he represents a dangerous hidden agenda. Any conversation is overheard by two or three cloaked Shadows, who accompany him and work through him as seen both in the television series and in the novel Babylon 5: The Passing of the Techno-Mages - Invoking Darkness. Indoctrinated by the Shadows after his capture during an expedition to Z'ha'dum, the Shadows' homeworld, he has accepted to serve because of the Shadows' manipulation of his guilt of the death of his wife and child and because they promise to save his family who he believed were trapped in hyperspace. When pushed, Morden drops any pretense of friendliness, openly threatening anyone who presents any difficulty to his associates.

Morden was killed and beheaded by Londo in 2261, during the efforts to expunge the Shadow influence from Centauri Prime. His head was placed upon a pike on the Centauri royal grounds, a gift from Londo to his aide, Vir Cotto, who mocks him in the exact manner he said he would, back when Morden had asked Vir what the latter wanted. He made a final appearance during the Brakiri holy day, the Day of the Dead, in 2262, in which the living are able to consult with apparitions of the dead. All the characters who answered the Shadow Question got exactly what they asked for, although Vir was the only one who was satisfied with the results.

=== Number One ===
Number One was portrayed by Marjorie Monaghan. Throughout the series, she is referred to as Number One until the last few episodes of season 5.

Before getting the role of Number One, Monaghan had auditioned for Babylon 5 once or twice before. The producers asked her to read for the part based on her work on Space Rangers, where she had also worked with Claudia Christian (Susan Ivanova on B5) years earlier. Monaghan found it "interesting to play characters about whom certain things are hidden", like her then undisclosed name.

Number One first appears in the season 4 episode "Racing Mars” as the leader of the resistance movement on Mars. The names Number One, Number Two, etc. were used on Mars by the resistance to protect the identity of its leaders. Once there, Franklin manages to convince her to stop her fellow members from attacking civilian targets. She later becomes head of covert intelligence for the Interstellar Alliance. As she comes aboard the station in the episode "Objects in Motion", she experiences problems with her identicard and identifies herself as Tessa Holloran. After that Garibaldi, Franklin, and later Sheridan refer to her as Tessa and no longer as Number One. She remains on board the station in her new role, upon Sheridan's recommendation that she would have access to more resources at Babylon 5 rather than being on Minbar.

== Minbari ==
The Minbari are an advanced race, who are a galactic superpower just like the Earth-Alliance. Their homeworld is the planet Minbar. Babylon 5 creator J. Michael Straczynski named the planet and race after the Islamic pulpit known as a minbar.

They were one of the military forces of the younger races in the previous Shadow War (the Vorlons being the main force) which took place roughly in the Earth year 1260 A.D. The Minbari were completely defeated by the Shadows in this first war and on the verge of total extinction but were saved by the Earth Babylon 4 station. The Minbari Federation is a caste society, its people divided into worker, warrior, and religious castes. The Minbari are led by the Grey Council, which contains nine representatives, originally three from each of the three castes. The council was disbanded by Ambassador Delenn as part of an effort to fight the Shadows. She later reorganized it, giving the Worker Caste (which had previously been caught in the middle of the power struggle between the Warrior and Religious castes) a substantial increase of power and influence. The new organization gave five positions to the Worker caste and two slots each to the Warrior and Religious castes. Minbari are humanoid, usually thin and pale, though considerably stronger in hand-to-hand combat than the average human of the same size; they are bald, with gray bony crests across the back of their heads. The first encounter between Minbari and Humans was a disaster – a misunderstanding led to Earth ships firing on Minbari ships, killing their leader Dukhat and precipitating the Earth-Minbari War. Shortly before reaching Earth, the Minbari surrendered and retreated. At the time the official reason for this reprieve was unknown.

The Minbari do not believe in any individual God or gods. They instead believe that the universe itself is sentient and that it "broke itself into pieces to study every aspect of its being" as is stated in many episodes through the entire series. They use base-11 mathematics and believe the number "3" to be sacred.

=== Branmer ===
Branmer is a deceased General (Shai Alit) who led the Minbari forces at the Battle of the Line. Branmer is not portrayed by an actor because his deceased body has been cremated.

Branmer's father was a member of the Warrior Caste, his mother was from the Religious Caste. Because the mother's caste takes precedence in Minbari society, Branmer began life as a member of the religious caste. He was a close friend of Grey Council member Delenn. When the Earth-Minbari War began, Branmer became a General of the warrior caste. Branmer felt it was his religious duty to carry out the war against the humans. When the Grey Council ended the war, Branmer obeyed the order to stand down.

In 2257, Branmer was on a diplomatic mission when he suddenly died. He had previously told Delenn that he had wished for a simple funeral followed by cremation. However, the clan he belonged to - the Star Riders - decided to take him on a lengthy journey home, which was seen as a most unusual move. The ship carrying Branmer's body soon arrived at Babylon 5. After lying in state over night, Branmer's first officer Neroon, followed by Delenn and the station's command staff, arrived at the place where Branmer's body was held. When Neroon opened the casket, Branmer's body was gone.

It is discovered that Delenn had stolen the body and had Branmer cremated. She was going to explain his disappearance as a religious mystery, that his body had been physically taken away by the "Gods". This actually was an inconsistency in the plot, both earlier ("Believers") and later episodes had said that the Minbari did not believe in specific religious deities. (These events take place during the episode "Legacies".)

=== Draal ===
Draal was played first by Louis Turenne and later by John Schuck. His first appearance was in the episode "A Voice in the Wilderness". Feeling that he had no place in modern Minbari society, he set out to visit his former student Delenn on Babylon 5 one final time before leaving to go "to the sea." During his visitation, the planet Epsilon III was experiencing geological instability, which threatened the orbital trajectory of the space station. It was discovered shortly thereafter that the planet housed a massive, globe-spanning mechanical system called the Great Machine, which was failing due to the terminal health of its supervisor, a lone alien named Varn. Because the Great Machine required a sentient mind to function as its central operating system, Varn's declining health was causing systematic failures that threatened the planet's integrity. Draal, reinvigorated by a sense of purpose and the opportunity to assist others in a way he no longer could on Minbar, gladly and willingly offered to take Varn's place as the custodian of the Great Machine. He then utilized the planet's defenses to destroy the violent separatists of Varn's species who had returned to take back its weapon systems.

Once in place, Draal's presence restored the planet to a stable condition and warned all of Babylon 5 station personnel to refrain from landing on the surface; he intended to preserve Varn's mission to protect the advanced technology from misuse, and thus, barred anyone from journeying to the planet until they were ready. Draal indicated that the machine had a role to fill in some future event, and that he would come to them when ready.

The next year, Draal (who had his health and appearance restored by the Great Machine, making him 30 years younger) appeared to Captain John Sheridan and put the Great Machine at the disposal of Sheridan and his allies in the fight against the Shadows. During his recovery, Draal had discovered that he was not alone on the planet, that there were others there who helped take care of the Great Machine, among them a being named Zathras.

Draal would appear again in the episode Voices of Authority. This time he helped the crew of Babylon 5 make contact with an ancient race considered to be one of the First Ones. While interfaced with Draal's computer, Susan Ivanova found the evidence in the Great Machine that President Morgan Clark had indeed orchestrated the assassination of President Luis Santiago.

After this appearance, Draal was mentioned from time to time in other episodes, but made no further appearances in the series. Schuck became unavailable due to commitments to a play, and producers did not want to cast a third actor for the role. J. Michael Straczynski has stated that he had other plans for the character, including an appearance in the first part of War Without End.

When Babylon 5 declared independence from the Earth Alliance in the episode Severed Dreams, the crew used Draal's holographic systems to allow Sheridan to broadcast the declaration to residents and crew on board the station. Ivanova asked Sheridan if they should seek Draal's help in defending the station. Sheridan said it was their fight, not his, and that he wanted to keep Draal's alliance with the station a secret as long as possible.

Later that year Draal used the Great Machine to expand the temporal rift in sector 14, where the Babylon 4 station had been. Doing so allowed John Sheridan and Jeffrey Sinclair to take the White Star back in time, and ensure that Babylon 4 entered the temporal rift and wound up 1,000 years in the past as was its destiny. Sinclair rode the station into the past, and became the Minbari leader Valen. Once Sheridan and the White Star arrived back in the present, Draal closed the rift so that no one else would become trapped in there.

After the Vorlons and the Shadows left the galaxy, President Morgan Clark began a propaganda war against Babylon 5 and its crew. In order to counter this propaganda, Sheridan and Ivanova decided to broadcast their own reports on the atrocities of the Clark regime from the station's War Room. Because of the great distance from Babylon 5 to Earth, Ivanova enlists the assistance of Draal and the Great Machine to provide the massive power needed to enhance the broadcast signal across the divide.

=== Dukhat ===
Dukhat was portrayed by Reiner Schöne. He was first mentioned in the episode "Soul Hunter". His only appearances were in the movie In the Beginning and in the episode "Atonement" as flashbacks.

Dukhat was the leader of the Minbari Grey Council when he was first introduced in the film In the Beginning. The Minbari considered him one of their greatest leaders, second only to the legendary Valen. In The Beginning reveals Dukhat as Delenn's mentor, and her eventual sponsor into the Grey Council, even though Dukhat belonged to the Warrior Caste and Delenn to the Religious Caste.

Dukhat's administration of the council was marked by growing fears of the reemergence of the ancient enemy of the Minbari, The Shadows. Many in the Gray Council refused to consider the possibility of the Shadows' return. In defiance, Dukhat ordered that the Council travel directly to the planet Z'ha'dum to investigate the rumors more closely. It was on this voyage that the Minbari first encountered humans.

This first contact ended disastrously for both sides. The Minbari Warrior Caste soldiers who crewed the council's flagship approached the Earth fleet with open gunports, a traditional gesture of respect. Realizing that humans would have no knowledge of this tradition, Dukhat ordered the gunports closed, but it was too late. Since the Earth ships could not jump away (due to an accidental side effect of the powerful Minbari scanners, which prevented Earth jump engines from working) and the human fleet commander was known to handle first contact situations rather badly, the humans believed that the Minbari were about to attack; they misinterpreted the Minbari gesture and opened fire. Dukhat was killed in the exchange, his death witnessed only by a grieving Delenn, whom Dukhat had trained. Delenn swore vengeance against the humans who had killed her master, and cast the deciding Council vote that began the Earth-Minbari War.

In The Beginning also revealed that Dukhat had secret Vorlon advisors when Vorlons had not openly contacted the Minbari for a long time.

=== Neroon ===
Neroon is a portrayed by John Vickery. He was a recurring guest character throughout the series.

Neroon was a member of the Minbari Warrior Caste from the Star Riders clan. During the storied Earth-Minbari War, Neroon fought against the humans and eventually became Alit (second in command) of a Minbari warship under the command of Shai Alit Branmer, a Minbari of mixed Religious- and Warrior-caste parentage, who was so incensed by what he perceived as the humans' unprovoked murder of Dukhat, the leader of the Grey Council, that he defied tradition and took up his father's caste, the Warrior caste. Neroon came to idolise Branmer but developed a distinct hatred and distrust of both humans and the Religious Caste. After Branmer's death, Neroon accompanied his body on a tour of Minbari-occupied space (in defiance of Branmer's final wishes to have a simple cremation ceremony and scattering his ashes in space over Minbar), and was ready to start the war again when the body suddenly went missing (Legacies).

After the transformation of Delenn in 2259, he replaced her on the Grey Council, creating for the first time an imbalance of power between the castes.

He was not impressed by the revelation of the Grey Council's secret and was angry at the years their leaders had been concealing the truth about the end of the war from the Minbari people. He blamed, or appeared to blame, the religious caste for this at that time, referring somewhat later to "the usual fanaticism we've come to expect from the religious caste". It took Delenn's honesty and willingness for self-sacrifice for the good of their people, and the revelation of the corruption rampant amongst his own caste's leadership, to make him change his mind (All Alone in the Night).

At the climax of the Minbari Civil war, Delenn challenged the leader of the warrior caste to stand in the Starfire wheel, a dangerous energy field and a symbol of leadership. The head of the warrior caste ultimately surrendered and left the circle, but Delenn stayed, intending for the death of a religious caste member to end the war. Moved by her bravery, Neroon took her place in the wheel. Declaring that in his heart, he was always a member of the religious caste, he died and ended the war (Moments of Transition).

Neroon was a complex character, a person of principle and courage who was deeply affected by his war service, a person of deep loyalties who was nonetheless eventually capable of seeing beyond these, who came to realize that the greatest courage is to admit when one is wrong, and to do whatever is necessary to make up for it, no matter the personal cost. When Delenn then restored the Grey Council, she held the leadership position of the Council open, stating: 'This place is reserved in memory of Neroon, until the day it is taken by the one who is to come'.

== Centauri ==
The Centauri Republic, once a mighty empire, has grown decadent and is in a slow decline. Their homeworld is Centauri Prime, a small Earth-like planet consisting of two large continents and several smaller islands divided by large oceans of water. The planet has a population of about 3.4 billion.

The Centauri, a humanoid race similar in appearance to humans, are a proud and aristocratic people governed by an emperor and a nobility-driven senate called the Centaurum. The Centauri were the first alien race to openly contact humanity. The Centauri initially tried to convince the humans that they were a long lost colony of the Republic. This ruse failed once human scientists got access to Centauri DNA, but Centauri-Human trade and contact led to tremendous technological advancement and humanity's eventual rise as a major power. For instance, it was the Centauri who sold jumpgate technology to the Earth Alliance, allowing humanity to start colonizing interstellar space.

Centauri males of high social status typically wear their hair in peacock-tail shaped fans, the length and style of which are determined by relative social class. Low-class Centauri males have not been seen without helmets. Centauri females mostly or entirely shave their heads. The social significance (if any) of complete versus almost-complete baldness on a female is not specified outright. In the televised episodes, older females are shown completely bald, and younger (up to the apparent human age range of the 30s, and often but not always unmarried) with ponytails.

The cardio-vascular system of Centauri includes two hearts instead of the single heart that humans have. The right heart is a solid mass of muscle which provides most of the force behind the body's blood circulation. The left heart is much more complex - this heart is made up of an intricate system of thousands of veins that help cleanse the blood in a manner similar to the human kidneys. The sexual organs of the Centauri are in a different location than the human sex organs. Male Centauri have six tentacle-like genital organs that extend out from the sides of the body and "fold" in over the solar plexus when not in use. The males can stretch the tentacles out to four feet.

A popular Centauri meal is a dish called spoo, which mostly serves as a running gag in the show. Spoo comes from an animal of the same name which is "regarded as [one of] the ugliest animals in the known galaxy by just about every sentient species capable of starflight" according to character Emerson Briggs-Wallace.

The government of the Centauri Republic is, despite it being called a republic, ruled by an Emperor and an assembly of Ministers and heads of various Houses that form the Centaurum. The Centauri Republic is reflective of many imperial cultures on Earth, although J. Michael Straczynski makes a specific comparison: "the British Empire once upon a time... It was a great military power. But slowly, as can happen, they grew content, and lazy, and gradually their own empire began to slip between their fingers".

=== Emperor Cartagia ===
Emperor Cartagia was played by Wortham Krimmer. He is mentioned by name early in the series, but his first on-screen appearance is in the fourth season episode The Hour of the Wolf.

Cartagia was the nephew of Emperor Turhan. When Cartagia was installed as emperor in 2259 by a group of Centauri politicians led by Lord Refa and Londo Mollari, he acted as, essentially, a powerless figurehead; however, he gradually amassed near-absolute power. The scale of his self-aggrandizement and madness were exposed in early 2261, near the end of the Shadow War, when he willingly brought Centauri Prime to the brink of annihilation by the Vorlons in an effort to secure his place among the gods. When Turhan died while on a visit to Babylon 5, he left no direct heirs (as his son had also died recently in an "accident"). It was expected that his Prime Minister, Malachi, would be the next Emperor but he was assassinated by forces loyal to Lord Refa. Several Centauri houses then vied for the throne but were unable to secure a binding claim, enabling Cartagia, with the backing of Refa's agents, to accede. Serving largely as a figurehead for Refa and his agents, Cartagia was in favor of the military expansion of the Centauri, including the conquest of the Narn, and this quickly translated into the Narn-Centauri conflict of 2259. After defeating the Narn in a series of quick strikes aided by the Shadows and illegal mass drivers, Cartagia's government undertook military campaigns against other races bordering Centauri space.

In early 2261, Cartagia had Babylon 5 Ambassador Mollari recalled to Centauri Prime and appointed him as Minister of Internal Security. At first, Cartagia merely seemed flamboyant and self-indulgent, with his shocking lower-class hairstyle and numerous hangers-on. It did not take long for Mollari to realize that Cartagia was dangerously insane, especially after he learned from Morden that Cartagia had allowed the Shadows, reeling from the events on Z'ha'dum, to establish a base on the Centauri homeworld. Mollari expressed his concerns to a member of the royal court, who explained that though the Centarum had tried to oppose Cartagia, all of his opposition had since disappeared, with the rumor being that Cartagia had hidden their heads in a secret room, where he spoke with them on a regular basis. Mollari later discovered this rumor to be true; it was also around this time that Londo learned that the Vorlons were destroying any planet with even the slightest taint of Shadow influence. When Londo informed Cartagia of this, he explained that the Shadows had agreed to reward his assistance by turning him into a deity. Cartagia then explained that the Vorlons would help his plans for deification by turning Centauri Prime into a massive inauguration pyre. Londo knew that, in order to protect his planet and its people, he would have to kill Cartagia.

During these events, G'Kar was captured and brought to Centauri Prime, initially presented by the Emperor as a gift to Londo. Cartagia proceeded to have G'Kar tortured prior to being executed, having him lashed with an electro-whip and even having an eye removed because he didn't like the way the Narn looked at him. Londo secretly visited G'Kar in his cell during all this and came to an agreement: in return for G'Kar's assistance in his plot to assassinate Cartagia, Londo would end the Centauri occupation of Narn. As part of this plot, Mollari convinced Cartagia to take G'Kar to Narn and execute him there, thus allowing Mollari to draw the Emperor away from the royal court, leaving him more vulnerable.

When they arrived on Narn, Cartagia planned to have G'Kar killed in front of local Narns to break their spirit. Mollari had arranged for the chains on G'Kar's restraints to be weakened, to distract Cartagia long enough for Londo to act. They would then secretly inject a poison into the Emperor which would cause his cardiovascular system to shut down nearly instantly.

The plan came close to failure when Cartagia had G'Kar's chains replaced after noting that they looked "weak." Despite this, G'Kar managed to break free and began fighting with the guards. In the commotion Mollari escorted Cartagia away from the fight and prepared to inject the poison into him. Cartagia went into a fit of rage about how this was not part of his destiny and reacting to being told to quiet down by Mollari, turned and punched him, knocking the device away. Cartagia grabbed Mollari in a stranglehold, ranting about how Mollari deserved to burn with the rest of the Centauri for failing to see his greatness. As Cartagia turned to walk away, he was injected with the poison by Vir Cotto, who had picked up the device while Londo and Cartagia struggled. Cartagia grabbed Vir by the throat, but was immediately overcome, falling insensible as he moaned that his dream of becoming a god would never be realized.

Shortly after this, the Imperial guards found Cartagia, supported by Mollari and Vir. Mollari explained that the Emperor had collapsed and that he believed the Emperor's hearts had failed. Mollari kept his promise to G'Kar, by explaining to the court that Centauri dealings with the Narn have resulted in the deaths of two Emperors and that Cartagia would interpret this as a sign from the gods to leave.

In the following days, as the Army of Light planned for its final assault upon the Vorlons and the Shadows, Mollari systematically removed the Shadow influence from Centauri Prime. He dealt first with the Shadow vessels on Centauri Prime by destroying the island they were on and then had Mr. Morden beheaded.

Following the death of Emperor Cartagia, the Centauri government decided not to name a new Emperor right away, hoping to prevent the possibility of another Cartagia assuming the throne. Indeed, a long-serving minister, Virini, remarked the royal bloodline was not what it once was due to inbreeding, commenting that, "...when you reduce a family tree to a family bush, you can't hide as much underneath." The Centarum selected Virini as their Regent, until such time as a new Emperor was selected.

=== Milo Virini ===
Milo Virini was played by Damian London. A member of the Centauri race, Virini is a Minister of the Centauri Imperial Court and later appointed Centauri Regent. He is named on screen only once during the episode In the Kingdom of the Blind.

As Minister, Virini often served as an intermediary in the Centauri Imperial Court, relating the Emperor's orders to his ambassadors early in the series. He was flamboyant in manner and practised strict sobriety, his only vice. He had served for a great many years in the court: he could remember Lord Jano as a small child being entertained by the Emperor Turhan; Londo Mollari had known him since his first visit to the royal court.

In the early part of the fourth season, he cautions Londo not to speak out against Emperor Cartagia after the arrival of the Shadow fleet on Centauri Prime. He claims (correctly, as the audience later finds out) that Cartagia has a desk upon which he has the heads of former cabinet ministers who disagreed with him, arranged in a row.

After the assassination of Cartagia in The Long Night, Prime Minister Mollari informs him that he has been appointed Regent to the throne until the Centaurum clearly determine how to fill the vacuum of power in Epiphanies. However, by the end of Epiphanies Virini came under the control of the Drakh, who sought revenge upon the Centauri Republic for their part in the Shadow War and plotted the destruction of Centauri Prime.

By In the Kingdom of the Blind, Virini has become reclusive, allowing only his personal physician and a few trusted aides access. He had been found wandering the palace at night talking furtively to himself, took to heavy drinking, and once ordered a guard to kill him, claiming that he was not himself. Routine documents such as status reports on the fleet and other reports were all reclassified 'Top Secret' for the Regent's eyes only, contrary to standard protocols.

The Drakh controlled Virini with a keeper, a parasitic life form that bonded to his shoulder and bent him to the will of the Drakh. Virini ordered the Centauri fleet to launch covert raids upon the shipping lines of members of the Interstellar Alliance to create unrest and distrust within the union. Ultimately this led to the Centauri war at the end of the fifth season, where the Narn and the Drazi devastated Centauri Prime.

In the episode, The Fall of Centauri Prime, the Regent introduces Mollari to a Drakh. The Drakh explains that they were servants of the Shadows and they want revenge by isolating the Centauri. If Londo does not agree to serve them, the Drakh threatens to detonate fusion bombs all over the planet, killing millions. Londo agrees, and the keeper leaves the Regent who then dies in Londo's arms.

=== Emperor Turhan ===
Turhan is the Emperor of the Centauri Republic until his death in 2259. The name Turhan comes from the first name of the actor who portrayed him, Turhan Bey.

Turhan succeeded his father as Emperor of the Centauri Republic. In 2257 Turhan appointed Londo Mollari to be the ambassador to Babylon 5. In "The Coming of Shadows", Turhan found that his health was declining, and before he died he decided that he wanted to apologize to the Narn people for all the wrongs his people had done to them. Against the advice of his ministers, he traveled to Babylon 5 in 2259 to deliver this apology in person to G'Kar. He asked his Prime Minister and close friend Malachi (also named for the actor who portrayed him—Malachi Throne) to remain behind on Centauri Prime during this time.

Shortly after arriving on Babylon 5, Turhan suffers a debilitating heart attack. It becomes apparent that Turhan would soon die from his condition. When he announced that he wanted to see a Vorlon before he died, Kosh fulfills this wish. Turhan asks Kosh "How will all this end?", Kosh cryptically replies, "…in fire."

Meanwhile, Lord Refa and Londo Mollari have gotten the Shadows to stage an attack on a Narn outpost. Lord Refa also has Malachi assassinated to remove a potential challenger from power. When told of the attack, Turhan whispers his last words to Londo Mollari: "You are both damned."

Emperor Turhan had no living heirs of his own, his son having predeceased him. With Malachi dead, there was no clear successor to the throne. Following Turhan's death, a number of Centauri families made challenges for the throne. Turhan's nephew, a young man named Cartagia, assumes the throne after Turhan's death.

=== Dius Vintari ===
Dius Vintari is the son of the Centauri Emperor Cartagia, and is the third in the line of succession to the Centauri throne, directly behind Vir Cotto, the assassin of Cartagia. According to Galen, he becomes the Emperor of the Centauri Republic in 2291, succeeding Vir.

Galen had a vision of a future in which Vintari, after becoming Emperor, would wage war on Earth and kill billions. Galen approaches President Sheridan to convince him to prevent this future by killing Vintari. Sheridan considers it, but after meeting the young man, decides instead to take him under his wing and bring him to Minbar, raising him as a son.

This way, Sheridan hopes to turn him away from the destructive path Galen warned about by showing him a peaceful and trusting way of life. Furthermore, Sheridan confronts Galen, who is seemingly upset at the thwarting of his plan, and all but makes him admit that the Technomage's actual plan was to manipulate Sheridan into making the moral decision he made.

=== Antono Refa ===
Lord Antono Refa is played by William Forward. He is a regular guest character in the second and third seasons.

Refa appears on Babylon 5 shortly after the only son of Emperor Turhan dies, leaving a gap in the line of succession for the Centauri throne. On his first visit, Refa makes it clear to Londo that he speaks for a group of Centauri politicians who are interested in making a move for the throne after the death of Turhan, whose health is in rapid decline. In an attempt to restore his wounded pride and prestige, Londo naively allies himself with Mr. Morden for assistance in dealing with problematic Narn military outposts, unaware that he is the intermediary for The Shadows. When the Shadows successfully destroy all their assigned targets, Londo's mysterious association with a powerful military force earns him tremendous political advancement in the Centauri Republic. Refa sees him and his "associates" as the tools necessary to complete the transition of power; while he initially believes Londo to be a fellow sympathizer, Londo's escalating reservations about Refa's ruthlessness in the Centaurum lead Refa to consider disposing of him once he has outlived his usefulness.

Later, this group stages a coup when the ailing Turhan pays a visit to Babylon 5. The purpose of this visit, as Turhan sees it, is to ask for forgiveness and peace from the Narn ambassador, G'Kar, for the great abuses the Centauri had done to the Narn. Unfortunately, Turhan collapses before he can make this offer in person to G'Kar, though his message is relayed through Dr. Franklin. With Turhan now dying and his message of peace not delivered in public view of the Centauri and Narn, Refa's men take this opportunity to strike, ordering the assassination of Turhan's prime minister on Centauri Prime, while Refa and Londo on Babylon 5 are present at the death of the Emperor. At the same time, the Shadows attack a Narn colony on Londo's behalf, restarting the Narn-Centauri War. When Refa informs Turhan of his and Londo's work, the Emperor's dying words to Mollari are "You are both damned," which Refa considers a rather small price for immortality.

With his political enemies out of the way, Refa and his associates install the mad Emperor Cartagia to power, and begin a protracted war against the Narn. Using Londo's agreement with the Shadows forces, Refa personally oversees the war. As the Narn forces begin to falter, Refa devises a masterstroke: to reconquer the Narn homeworld in a single, massive attack. When he learns that the Narn have diverted the majority of their fleet to destroy a vital supply post on Gorash 7, he needles Londo into tasking his Shadow forces to destroy the fleet so that the Centauri forces have a clear line of attack on the Narn homeworld. The Shadows obliterate the Narn fleet at Gorash 7, and the Centauri fleet arrives at the Narn homeworld with mass drivers: large ships that utilize asteroids for planetary bombardment. Refa cordially drafts the reluctant Londo into attending the assault on an escort vessel; the experience traumatizes Londo and, coupled with Refa's violation of multiple weapons treaties, he becomes disenchanted with their alliance. After 4 days of bombardment, the Narn unconditionally surrender.

Following the Second Conquest of Narn, Londo dissolves his partnership with Morden to prevent further escalation. Undeterred, Morden approaches and re-establishes his business relationship with Refa, much to Londo's dismay, especially considering Refa then encourages Emperor Cartargia to engage in a dozen simultaneous and pointless wars with various neighboring powers. In an effort to prevent Lord Refa from continuing his relationship with the Shadows and to encourage a more rational military situation, Londo poisons Refa's drink (or at least claims to) during a meeting on Babylon 5 with a binary poison. He informs Refa that the second, activating dose of the poison would be clandestinely administered unless he stops the needless military campaigns and terminates his relationship with Morden; it would also be administered if he attempts to betray him in the future. Angrily, Refa agrees.

Again, Morden comes to Londo, this time quite angry that Londo would interfere in his associates' activities in this way. However, Londo really does want nothing more to do with Morden, so when Londo gives him the brush-off, Morden arranges for Londo to care again, by setting up the murder of Londo's true love, Adira. However, Morden takes this further, by killing her with a poison of Centauri origin, allowing Morden to convince Londo to place the blame on Lord Refa, whom Londo already knows is still upset about being "poisoned" himself. This, again, places Londo in association with Morden. Finally, though, Londo resolves to do something about Lord Refa, who has himself been inciting a feud between their two houses on Centauri Prime.

In an elaborate plot staged to maximize Londo's political gain, Refa is lured to the Narn homeworld in expectations of capturing G'Kar, who is on Narn ostensibly looking for his old assistant, Na'Toth. However, the actual plan is to capture Refa, who was responsible for the decision to use mass drivers on Narn, and turn him over to G'Kar and his Narn associates, who, in addition to having several Narn prisoners released from Centauri custody to ensure their cooperation, were allowed by Londo to kill this Centauri without retaliation. Two of the reasons Londo has Refa killed are personal: the death of Adira Tyree (which, in fact, Refa was not involved with as the true culprit was Mr. Morden) and the murder of Prime Minister Malachi (which Refa committed to ensure the enthronement of Cartagia). In the end, with orders from G'Kar to leave the Centauri's head unmarked for identification, Lord Refa is chased down by G'Kar's Narn associates and beaten to death. On Babylon 5, Londo presents evidence of Refa's "betrayal" of the Centauri to the visiting Centauri minister, gaining prestige in the royal court and ridding himself of Lord Refa. Footage of Refa's death at the Narn's hands is intercut with a Baptist prayer service on Babylon 5, which includes a hymn called "There's No Hiding Place Down here"—about the inevitability of the punishment of a fleeing sinner. William Forward asked J. Michael Straczynski "Why me?" Why was his character being killed off? Straczynski told him "If he hadn't done such a good job, this wouldn't have happened, because no one would've cared about the character."

== Dilgar ==
The Dilgar were a race depicted in the show as an aggressive, warlike society who initiated a sudden and unexplained campaign of conquest against all neighboring worlds between 2229 and 2232. Regarding all alien species as little more than animals, the Dilgar slaughtered entire populations and ruthlessly enslaved the few survivors.

A coalition between The League of Non-Aligned Worlds and the Earth Alliance reversed the Dilgar's advances and ultimately blockaded them on their homeworld. This victory established Earth, previously considered a newcomer, as an interstellar power. The cause of the Dilgar's abrupt attacks was revealed when their sun went supernova, wiping out almost the entire species. Only a single civilian colony on the planet Planthos survived the war and cataclysm.

In the episode Deathwalker, a Dilgar survivor of the war appears on the Babylon 5 station in the year 2258 and is revealed to be Jha'Dur, known to many races as "Deathwalker" because of the many extravagant war crimes she committed. Following the war, Jha'Dur secretly entered the service of the "Wind Swords", a particularly militant Clan of the Minbari Warrior Caste. She came to Babylon 5 to establish her people's legacy via an immortality serum, claiming that it was so that all races could be indebted to the Dilgar for immortality. However, it is revealed that the immortality serum required the death of a sentient being to work: Deathwalker intended to increase war, bloodshed and other atrocities among the other races. She nearly accomplished her plan: an alliance of races attempted to employ her to refine a version of the serum that did not require murder; however, her Minbari flyer was destroyed by a Vorlon warship as she was leaving Babylon 5.

The Dilgar are depicted as humanoid with pointed ears similar to Vulcans. They are designed to have somewhat longer eyes than the eyes of species such as Humans, Centauri, Minbari, Narn etc. Their pupils are vertically elongated similar to those of cats. The bridge of their nose is widened and goes up the forehead, making a v-shape rise in the forehead. The tips of their eyebrows are pointed, similar to Centauri eyebrows.

=== Jha'dur / Deathwalker ===
Jha'dur is a Dilgar specialist in biochemical, biogenetic, and cyber-organic weaponry, and was responsible for many of the atrocities committed by the Dilgar during the Dilgar war. Her activities earned her the epithet "Deathwalker". After the war, Jha'dur was sheltered by the Wind Swords, a militant clan of Minbari warriors, in exchange for her services as a weapons expert.

When the war began, the Wind Swords approached the Grey Council and offered them devastating weapons that Jha'dur had developed in the preceding two decades. These weapons were never used against the humans, by order of the Grey Council.

The Wind Swords concealed Jha'dur's existence from the other species until 2258, when she left Minbar and traveled to Babylon 5 with one of the fruits of her research: an experimental drug that retarded the aging process in humanoids, conferring immortality on whoever used it. A key ingredient in the drug could not be synthesized; it had to be extracted from living beings. The resulting genocidal wars would be her vengeance on Earth and the League for the extinction of her people.

In the episode "Deathwalker", as Jha'dur's ship prepared to embark for Earth, a Vorlon warship arrived and destroyed it, vaporizing Jha'dur and the only existing sample of the drug. When asked why they killed her, Ambassador Kosh replied cryptically that the younger species were not ready for immortality. With the death of Jha'dur, the last trace of the Dilgar was erased from the galaxy.

== Narn ==
Another "young race" like humanity, the Narn Regime were previously occupied and enslaved by the Centauri, and bear them deep ill-will because of the brutal methods of control employed. Narns are widely perceived to be primitive and barbaric, a stereotype the Centauri engendered during their occupation.

The Narn are led by the Kha'Ri council on their homeworld, Narn Prime. Their religion venerates philosopher prophets, and most Narn draw strength from various different holy writings, the most noted being The Book of G'Quan. Narns are tall and have a stocky build; they are bald, with a yellowish complexion, mottled with brown and/or green spots. Although they appear reptilian, they are in fact marsupial and at least presumably mammalian, in nature.

=== Ta'Lon ===
Ta'Lon (Marshall R. Teague, credited as Marshall Teague) is a Narn soldier and pilot who encountered Captain John Sheridan when they were both captured and held aboard a Streib vessel. After being forced into brief gladiatorial combat, they helped each other to escape and Ta'Lon returned to the Narn homeworld to recover from his wounds. He later arrived on Babylon 5 serving as a bodyguard to the representative of the Centauri-occupied Narn government, a position he soon left, and remained on the station becoming a member of the Narn Resistance and lieutenant to Citizen G'kar. Upon G'kar's decision to resign as Ambassador to Babylon 5, it was Ta'Lon whom he selected as the new representative of Narn. As a matter of his sworn soldierly duty, Ta'Lon carries a Ka'tok, a ceremonial sword greatly resembling a katana that once drawn cannot be sheathed before drawing blood. Grasping the sword's hilt and unsheathing it only an inch is threat enough to discourage most foes. He is also known to draw the sword to add emphasis and dramatic effect to his statements despite knowing he then has to cut into his own hand to fulfill his duty to the sword.

=== Ko'Dath ===
Ko'Dath (Mary Woronov) is the aide to Narn ambassador, G'Kar, in the first-season episode "Born to the Purple". Two episodes later it is revealed she died in an offscreen airlock accident, and she is replaced by Na'Toth.

The character of Ko'Dath was originally intended to be a main character, and was named in the opening credits of "Born to the Purple" (in place of Na'Toth's credit). However, actress Mary Woronov had severe difficulties with the required prosthetic appliances and refused to wear the provided red contact lenses, and resigned after just one episode. Ko'Dath was hastily killed off as a result.

== Vorlon ==
The Vorlons are an ancient and technologically advanced race, one of the last of the First Ones. Little is known of Vorlon history, but they are known to have played a significant role in defeating the Shadows in the previous great wars over the past million years. For thousands of years, Vorlons have been observing and manipulating younger races, creating the telepaths of various species, including Humanity, who, for the most part, were initially created as weapons for the Vorlon's Wars with The Shadows. Little is known about their appearance. When interacting with other races they wear complex encounter suits that completely hide their true appearance. When Ambassador Londo Mollari of the Centauri Republic observed an unsuited Vorlon, he claimed to have not seen anything at all. Show creator J. Michael Straczynski has said about this that: "Londo saw what he said he saw." At least one Babylon 5 novel contradicts Straczynski's statement, saying that Mollari saw a bright ball of energy.

=== Kosh Naranek ===
Kosh Naranek was the Vorlon ambassador to Babylon 5 from 2257 until his death. He was physically played by producer Jeffrey Willerth, and the voice for the character was provided by Ardwight Chamberlain. Babylon 5's producer and creator, J. Michael Straczynski, has noted that Naranek is a title, not part of a name.

Depicted as one of the older members of his species, Kosh Naranek was well regarded by the Vorlon Empire. The plot of the series pilot entailed Kosh's arrival, humanity's first contact with a Vorlon, and an attempt on his life by a member of the Wind Swords, a militant section of the Minbari warrior caste. Disguising himself as station Commander Jeffrey Sinclair, the would-be assassin poisoned Kosh. The Vorlon government prohibited opening Kosh's encounter suit. The Vorlon Government seemed to assume he would die, and demanded that not only his body be returned to the Vorlon Homeworld but also Commander Sinclair should accompany it to stand trial.

With Sinclair's prompting, Doctor Benjamin Kyle decided to risk treating Kosh, which meant opening the encounter suit. Determining that a cure would be impossible without knowing where the poison entered the Vorlon, Dr. Kyle convinced newly arrived Psi Corps telepath Lyta Alexander to scan the Vorlon. Despite the strict Psi Corps rules in such cases, Lyta performed the scan. Kosh's recovery was assured as the Minbari assassin was cornered.

After Sheridan pleaded with Kosh for help against the Shadows, Kosh finally authorized the Vorlons to intervene, albeit in a limited capacity. Even so, the Vorlon involvement turned the tide of that battle. The Shadows later broke into Kosh's chamber and murdered him in an act of reprisal. As Kosh was dying, Sheridan had a dream in which Kosh appeared to him in the form of Sheridan's father. As the dream ended and Sheridan woke, he realized that it was Kosh speaking to him and that he had been attacked. While most of Kosh perished in the attack, a small part managed to disassociate and hid within Sheridan. This portion would later be revealed during Sheridan's resurrection on Z'ha'dum.

The last parts of Kosh's essence, finally released from Sheridan, would perish while fighting Ulkesh (Kosh II) with assistance from Lorien and Lyta Alexander.

== Others ==
=== Lorien ===
Lorien appears at the start of season four and again in the last episode of the show. He is played by Wayne Alexander. Alexander was also seen in Babylon 5 as Mr. Sebastian from the second-season episode "Comes the Inquisitor" and as a Drakh from the fifth-season episode "The Fall of Centauri Prime".

Lorien made his first appearance in the episode "The Hour of the Wolf". Lorien makes the statement that he is not a First One but rather the First One, belonging to an immortal race of great wisdom and power, and, according to himself, the first being to achieve sentience in the universe. It was his race that discovered and nurtured many of what the Humans and Minbari refer to as the First Ones, including the Vorlons and the Shadows.

In the millennia after most of the First Ones left the galaxy, Lorien came to reside on Z'ha'dum, and it was his presence there that draws the Shadows to return every time they were driven off. In late 2260, during the final Shadow War, Capt. John Sheridan of Babylon 5 comes to Z'ha'dum to parley with the Shadows. After this meeting ends poorly, with Sheridan exploding nuclear warheads within the Shadow capital city and leaping into a gorge, Sheridan ends up stuck between life and death in the depths of Z'ha'dum. During this dream state, Sheridan meets Lorien and near the end of the ensuing discussion on life, death and the universe, Lorien asks Sheridan a question:

Do you have anything worth living for?

As Lorien lulls him to embrace death, this is the question Sheridan answers. Freed from the fear of death, Sheridan lets go and Lorien in turn imbues Sheridan with a part of his own life force, returning Sheridan to life. Together they depart Z'ha'dum for Babylon 5, where Sheridan, presumed dead, arrives in time to prevent a rebellion among the alliance races. During the remnant of the Shadow War, Lorien becomes Sheridan's constant companion, serving as counselor, teacher and ally. It is partly with Lorien's assistance that Sheridan is able to defeat the Vorlon ambassador Ulkesh after the Vorlon involvement in the Shadow War begins. Most critical is Lorien's role in bringing about the end of the Shadow War in 2261, by providing a stage for Sheridan and Delenn to speak to the Shadows and the Vorlons and showing the alliance races the truth behind the war. In the end, beseeched by the Vorlons and the Shadows as if by children to their father, Lorien agrees to leave the galaxy with them and the remaining First Ones, ushering in a new era in the galaxy. Lorien reappears a last time, in 2281, when Sheridan returns to Coriana 6 during the last hours of his life, as he was enjoined by Kosh to do.

=== Zathras ===
Zathras is the name shared by a group of characters, all portrayed by Tim Choate and voiced by Paul Guyet in Babylon 5: The Road Home. There were ten of these characters who appeared on several episodes throughout the series. The name of Zathras' species and homeworld were never revealed; in "War Without End", Zathras is seen living on Epsilon III and helping take care of the Great Machine with one other member of his race, although there is no evidence that this is their actual homeworld. The oldest Zathras is the oldest living (110 years old) caretaker of the Great Machine, in the service of the mysterious and messianic "The One" when first appearing.

A slightly shaggy, slightly hunchbacked humanoid, Zathras is prone to deadpan delivery of somewhat cryptic, somewhat humorous, generally self-pitying statements, such as "Zathras is used to being beast of burden to other people's needs. Very sad life. Probably have very sad death. But, at least there is symmetry.", or "No one ever listens to poor Zathras, no, he's quite mad, they say. It is good that Zathras does not mind, has even grown to like it." These speech patterns were patterned after J. Michael Straczynski's Polish-born grandmother's uneasy grasp of English.

He also refers to himself in the third person, although sometimes instead of himself, he refers to his brothers, as the story mentions that Zathras is one of 10 different brothers whose names all sound nigh indistinguishably like 'Zathras'. This fact is revealed by a younger brother of the first Zathras – the second Zathras to be seen – who may appear twice, as "War Without End" features Tim Choate in a dual role as two Zathrases discussing the condition of the great machine. It is explained that the way to differentiate one Zathras from another is to listen to the inflection of the name. However, as he demonstrates the differences to Ivanova, she (and the audience) are unable to detect any difference between one and the others, though it may simply be due to humans lacking the aural sensitivity to detect the subtle differences in the inflections.

The first Zathras travelled 1,000 years into the past on Babylon 4 with Jeffrey Sinclair, who (during the trip) transformed into the Minbari religious figure Valen in order to help the Minbari defeat the Shadows. The fate of the first Zathras is not fully known following the Minbari's acceptance of Sinclair as Valen, but Zathras does appear in the comic In Valen's Name and appears to act as Valen's assistant. In the comic, Rashok, a Minbari, attempts to speak to Valen, and Zathras prevents Rashok from doing so and is strong enough to overpower Rashok. Zathras appears to be of some importance as he states, "If Valen can listen to Zathras... you can listen to Zathras!" Rashok also refers to Zathras as Valen's "helpmate". The comic also shows how quickly Zathras' behavior can shift, as he goes from attacking Rashok to offering to make him a snack.
