= Streib =

Streib is a surname. Notable people with the surname include:

- Max Streib (1912–1989), Swiss field handball player
- Werner Streib (1911–1986), German Luftwaffe fighter ace

== See also ==
- The Streibs, a fictional civilization in the science-fiction television show Babylon 5
