= List of Babylon 5 episodes =

Babylon 5 is an American science fiction television series created, produced and largely written by J. Michael Straczynski. The show centers on the Babylon 5 space station: a focal point for politics, diplomacy, and conflict during the years 2257–2262. With its prominent use of planned story arcs, the series was often described as a "novel for television".

The pilot film premiered on February 22, 1993. The regular series aired from January 26, 1994, and ran for five full seasons. Due to Warner corporate structure and policy concerning syndication in general, and syndication of properties produced by the defunct PTEN division in particular, the show has been syndicated only briefly, and did not appear on U.S. television from 2003 through 2018 (though it has aired in other countries). In 2018, the show began airing nightly on the Comet TV Sci-Fi Network. The show spawned six television films and a spin-off series, Crusade, which aired in 1999 and ran for 13 episodes. On July 31, 2007, a DVD was released containing two short films about selected characters from the series.

The five seasons of the series each correspond to one fictional sequential year in the period 2258–2262. Each season shares its name with an episode that is central to that season's plot. As the series starts, the Babylon 5 station is welcoming ambassadors from various races in the galaxy. Earth has just barely survived an accidental war with the powerful Minbari, who, despite their superior technology, mysteriously surrendered at the brink of the destruction of the human race.

Some episodes in the second season were aired out of their intended chronological sequence. Straczynski confirmed that in Season 2, "A Race Through Dark Places" should precede "Soul Mates," and that "Knives" should precede "In the Shadow of Z'ha'dum."

== Series overview ==
Season	Episodes	Originally released		
Season	Episodes	First released	Last released	Network
Pilot	1	February 22, 1993		PTEN
1	22	January 26, 1994	October 3, 1994	PTEN
2	22	November 2, 1994	August 15, 1995	PTEN
3	22	November 6, 1995	September 22, 1996	PTEN
4	22	November 4, 1996	October 27, 1997	PTEN
5	22	January 21, 1998	November 25, 1998	TNT

== Episodes ==
=== Pilot film (1993) ===
Title	Directed by	Written by	Original release date
Babylon 5: The Gathering	Richard Compton	J. Michael Straczynski	February 22, 1993
The Vorlon ambassador is nearly killed by an assassin shortly after arriving at the station. Commander Sinclair is the prime suspect.

=== Season 1: Signs and Portents (1994) ===
During 2258, Commander Jeffrey Sinclair is in charge of the station, assisted by executive officer Susan Ivanova and security chief Michael Garibaldi. The season traces his gradual recollection of his capture by the Minbari during their war with humans. The Minbari came to believe that Sinclair carried the soul of Valen, a revered Minbari leader. Inferring that Minbari souls were being reborn as humans, the Minbari surrendered to avoid further fratricide. This action is a source of internal strife between some Minbari.

Meanwhile, tensions between the Centauri Republic, an empire in decline, and the Narn Regime, a former Centauri dominion which successfully rebelled, are increasing. Seeking for his people to regain their former prominence, Mollari makes a deal with a mysterious ally, Mr. Morden, to strike back at the Narn. On Earth, some humans resent the influence of aliens, and seek to eliminate them from Earth-owned property, including Babylon 5.

Minbari Ambassador Delenn is revealed to belong to the Grey Council, the Minbari ruling body. She eventually transforms into a Minbari/human hybrid, ostensibly to build a bridge between the humans and Minbari. The year ends with the death of Earth Alliance president Luis Santiago, which the staff of Babylon 5 believe to have been an assassination.

No. overall	No. in season	Title	Directed by	Written by	Original release date	Prod. code
1	1	"Midnight on the Firing Line"	Richard Compton	J. Michael Straczynski	January 26, 1994	103
When the Narn attack a Centauri colony, Londo and G'Kar nearly come to blows. Meanwhile, raiders are attacking transport ships near the station.
2	2	"Soul Hunter"	Jim Johnston	J. Michael Straczynski	February 2, 1994	102
A badly damaged ship is brought into the station, and the strange alien inside is identified as a Soul Hunter—an immortal race who can sense death and supposedly steal someone's soul.
3	3	"Born to the Purple"	Bruce Seth Green	Larry DiTillio	February 9, 1994	104
Londo's career is in jeopardy when a beautiful slave seduces him and steals a sensitive computer file. Garibaldi investigates an unauthorized use of a restricted communications channel.
4	4	"Infection"	Richard Compton	J. Michael Straczynski	February 16, 1994	101
Dr. Franklin gets a visit from old friend and mentor, xenoarcheologist Dr. Hendricks. He wants Franklin's help to analyze hi-tech organic artifacts he found on a dead world. But the artifacts seem to have a will of their own, and start to manipulate Hendricks' assistant.
5	5	"The Parliament of Dreams"	Jim Johnston	J. Michael Straczynski	February 23, 1994	108
Sinclair's old flame, Catherine Sakai, arrives during a weeklong festival when humans and aliens demonstrate their religious beliefs. An old enemy sends an assassin to kill G'Kar.
6	6	"Mind War"	Bruce Seth Green	J. Michael Straczynski	March 2, 1994	110
A rogue telepath with exceptional powers takes refuge on Babylon 5, and two PSI Cops arrive to capture him. Catherine Sakai heads to Sigma 957 to survey it for Quantium-40, ignoring G'Kar's grave warnings.
7	7	"The War Prayer"	Richard Compton	D. C. Fontana	March 9, 1994	107
A racist group is terrorizing aliens on Babylon 5, stabbing and branding them. Meanwhile, Londo has trouble with two young Centauri who want to break tradition by ignoring their arranged marriages, and instead marrying for love.
8	8	"And the Sky Full of Stars"	Janet Greek	J. Michael Straczynski	March 16, 1994	106
Sinclair is kidnapped and interrogated by two men determined to prove he betrayed Earth during the Battle of the Line.
9	9	"Deathwalker"	Bruce Seth Green	Larry DiTillio	April 20, 1994	113
Na'Toth attacks an alien woman that has just arrived on the station, claiming that she is the Dilgar war criminal Jha'dur—known as Deathwalker. And Talia is hired by Kosh to oversee some rather strange negotiations.
10	10	"Believers"	Richard Compton	David Gerrold	April 27, 1994	105
An alien couple comes to Dr. Franklin with their terminally ill son. The child could be cured by a simple operation, but the parents' religion specifically forbids it. Meanwhile, Ivanova escorts a damaged starliner through raider territory.
11	11	"Survivors"	Jim Johnston	Marc Scott Zicree	May 4, 1994	111
There is an explosion in one of the fighter bays just days before Earth President Santiago is to visit Babylon 5. A dying man implicates Garibaldi, which is just what the head of presidential security wants to hear, as she blames him for her father's death.
12	12	"By Any Means Necessary"	Jim Johnston	Kathryn M. Drennan	May 11, 1994	114
An accident in the docking bays starts a series of problems on Babylon 5, when a Narn freighter is destroyed and one of the workers is killed. The dock workers demand better conditions or they'll go on strike. And G'Kar has to get a replacement G'Quan-Eth plant for an important religious ceremony.
13	13	"Signs and Portents"	Janet Greek	J. Michael Straczynski	May 18, 1994	116
A Centauri noble comes to Babylon 5 to transport an important Centauri relic in Londo's possession back to the homeworld. And a mysterious man visits all the alien ambassadors asking them an unusual question.
14	14	"TKO"	John C. Flinn III	Larry DiTillio	May 25, 1994	119
Garibaldi is surprised when an old friend comes to Babylon 5 to fight in the mutai—a savage alien fighting arena. Meanwhile, Ivanova has trouble dealing with her father's death.
15	15	"Grail"	Richard Compton	Christy Marx	July 6, 1994	109
A man comes to Babylon 5 asking the alien ambassadors for information that can help him with his quest to find the Holy Grail, while a Downbelow gangster gives security problems by mindwiping all who oppose him.
16	16	"Eyes"	Jim Johnston	Larry DiTillio	July 13, 1994	122
Sinclair's decisions of the last year catch up with him, when an internal affairs investigator arrives to test the crew's loyalty to Earth Force with the help of a telepath. And Lennier shows great interest in Garibaldi's attempt at assembling a 1990s motorcycle.
17	17	"Legacies"	Bruce Seth Green	D. C. Fontana	July 20, 1994	115
A Minbari war cruiser comes to Babylon 5 to display the body of a recently dead Minbari leader, while Ivanova and Talia battle for the fate of a young girl with newly discovered telepathic powers.
18	18	"A Voice in the Wilderness (Part 1)"	Janet Greek	J. Michael Straczynski	July 27, 1994	120
Strange signals begin emanating from Epsilon 3, the planet Babylon 5 orbits. A science ship is sent to investigate, but is fired upon by a defense system on the planet. When a revolt against the Earth-appointed government breaks out on Mars, Garibaldi worries about a former lover stationed there.
19	19	"A Voice in the Wilderness (Part 2)"	Janet Greek	J. Michael Straczynski	August 3, 1994	121
The situation become more tense when an Earth Force heavy cruiser arrives at the station to "protect Earth's interests", and the fusion reactors on Epsilon 3 begin to act erratically, threatening to destroy the planet and Babylon 5.
20	20	"Babylon Squared"	Jim Johnston	J. Michael Straczynski	August 10, 1994	118
Babylon 4 reappears at the same place it disappeared four years earlier, and Sinclair and Garibaldi lead an expedition to evacuate its crew. Meanwhile, Delenn is summoned by the Grey Council. They inform her that they have selected a new leader: her.
21	21	"The Quality of Mercy"	Lorraine Senna Ferrara	J. Michael Straczynski	August 17, 1994	117
Dr. Franklin investigates an unlicensed medical practitioner in Downbelow, while Londo takes Lennier on a tour of Babylon 5's seedier locales. And in the brig, a convicted murderer waits for his sentence to be carried out—the death of personality.
22	22	"Chrysalis"	Janet Greek	J. Michael Straczynski	October 3, 1994 (UK); October 26, 1994 (US)	112
A Narn outpost adjacent to Centauri space ignites a conflict between the two races, when Londo gets an offer to take care of the problem. Meanwhile, Garibaldi tries to find out what his informant stumbled upon that got him killed.

=== Season 2: The Coming of Shadows (1994–1995) ===
Captain John Sheridan assumes the military governance of the station after Sinclair is reassigned, without explanation, to Minbar. He and the command staff discover that now-president Morgan Clark arranged the assassination of President Santiago. Conflict develops between the Babylon 5 command staff and the Psi Corps, an increasingly autocratic organization which oversees and controls the lives of human telepaths.

Ambassador Mollari, in preparation for the death of the ailing Centauri Emperor, works with Lord Refa to assassinate any challengers to the throne, while continuing to utilize Mr. Morden and his "associates"—the Shadows—against the Narn. When the emperor dies, Mollari and Refa place the emperor's unstable nephew, Cartagia, on the throne. Through him they instigate full-scale war with the Narn, using weapons of mass destruction to conquer the Narn homeworld.

Earth's government becomes more totalitarian, suppressing dissent and broadcasting propaganda. Kosh and other Vorlons approach Sheridan and reveal themselves to be the enemies of the Shadows, asking for Sheridan's help to fight them.

No. overall	No. in season	Title	Directed by	Written by	Original release date	Prod. code
23	1	"Points of Departure"	Janet Greek	J. Michael Straczynski	November 2, 1994	201
Captain John Sheridan takes command of Babylon 5 after Sinclair is reassigned, a rogue Minbari warship is on the loose, and the truth behind the end of the Minbari War is revealed.
24	2	"Revelations"	Jim Johnston	J. Michael Straczynski	November 9, 1994	202
Franklin takes extreme measures to save Garibaldi; Delenn emerges from her chrysalis; Sheridan's sister arrives for a visit; Londo's dealings with Mr. Morden become even more complex; and G'Kar returns from his travels with a dire warning.
25	3	"The Geometry of Shadows"	Mike Vejar	J. Michael Straczynski	November 16, 1994	203
Londo continues to seek prestige and power back home; a group of Technomages visit the station; and Ivanova is forced to settle a dangerous dispute among the Drazi population.
26	4	"A Distant Star"	Jim Johnston	D. C. Fontana	November 23, 1994	204
Sheridan launches a dangerous operation to rescue an Earth exploration ship, captained by his friend, when it is stranded in hyperspace; Delenn's authority within the Minbari is questioned as a result of her transformation.
27	5	"The Long Dark"	Mario Di Leo	Scott Frost	November 30, 1994	205
A cryonic exploration vessel from a hundred years ago approaches Babylon 5, bringing with it a deadly creature and a human from the past.
28	6	"Spider in the Web"	Kevin G. Cremin	Larry DiTillio	December 7, 1994	206
An old friend of Talia Winters is murdered by what appears to be an agent of a Martian resistance movement.
29	7	"Soul Mates"	John C. Flinn III	Peter David	December 14, 1994	208
Londo's three wives arrive on the station; Delenn seeks Ivanova's help in adjusting to her new human characteristics; and Talia's ex-husband, a fellow Psi Corps telepath, arrives on the station with an intriguing story.
30	8	"A Race Through Dark Places"	Jim Johnston	J. Michael Straczynski	January 25, 1995	207
Psi Cop Alfred Bester returns to Babylon 5, searching for an underground railroad helping rogue telepaths to escape the Corps; his arrival sparks discord among the command staff as they realize that an insider is helping the railroad.
31	9	"The Coming of Shadows"	Janet Greek	J. Michael Straczynski	February 1, 1995	209
Centauri Emperor Turhan comes to Babylon 5 for a state visit, prompting extreme behavior from both G'Kar and Londo. Garibaldi encounters a group called "the Rangers".
32	10	"GROPOS"	Jim Johnston	Larry DiTillio	February 8, 1995	210
Babylon 5 plays host to 25,000 EarthForce marines, known as "ground-pounders", led by General Richard Franklin, Stephen's father.
33	11	"All Alone in the Night"	Mario Di Leo	J. Michael Straczynski	February 15, 1995	211
During a Starfury flight, Sheridan is kidnapped by an unknown alien race. Delenn is summoned by the Grey Council to hear her fate.
34	12	"Acts of Sacrifice"	Jim Johnston	J. Michael Straczynski	February 22, 1995	212
G'Kar attempts to rally support for his people from Sheridan and the Earth Alliance; Ivanova goes to great lengths to secure an alliance with a new race.
35	13	"Hunter, Prey"	Menachem Binetski	J. Michael Straczynski	March 1, 1995	213
The command staff races against time – and EarthForce – to find a missing doctor who has information on President Santiago's assassination.
36	14	"There All the Honor Lies"	Mike Vejar	Peter David	April 26, 1995	215
Sheridan nearly loses his command after he kills a Minbari in self-defense. Ivanova is placed in charge of a gift shop selling Babylon 5 merchandise.
37	15	"And Now for a Word"	Mario Di Leo	J. Michael Straczynski	May 3, 1995	214
An ISN news crew spends 36 hours on Babylon 5 to film a documentary, capturing a snapshot of life on the station as well as the progress of the Narn-Centauri war.
38	16	"In the Shadow of Z'ha'dum"	David J. Eagle	J. Michael Straczynski	May 10, 1995	217
Sheridan discovers a connection between his late wife and the mysterious Mr Morden, and makes enemies of everyone around him when he has Morden detained. Elsewhere, the Nightwatch is formed on the station.
39	17	"Knives"	Stephen L. Posey	Larry DiTillio	May 17, 1995	216
Londo is reunited with an old friend, only to be caught in the middle of Republic agendas. An alien life form invades Sheridan's body.
40	18	"Confessions and Lamentations"	Kevin G. Cremin	J. Michael Straczynski	May 24, 1995	218
A deadly plague threatens the Markab race with extinction, leaving Franklin in a race against time to find the cure before even more species are infected.
41	19	"Divided Loyalties"	Jesus Trevino	J. Michael Straczynski	July 25, 1995 (UK); October 11, 1995 (US)	220
Lyta Alexander returns to Babylon 5 with news that one of the command staff may, unknowingly, be a sleeper agent for the Psi Corps.
42	20	"The Long, Twilight Struggle"	John C. Flinn III	J. Michael Straczynski	August 1, 1995 (UK); October 18, 1995 (US)	219
The Centauri war machine rolls on toward the Narn homeworld, unknowingly aided by the Shadows, while the remains of the Narn fleet plan a last-ditch counter-attack.
43	21	"Comes the Inquisitor"	Mike Vejar	J. Michael Straczynski	August 8, 1995 (UK); October 25, 1995 (US)	221
The Vorlons send an "Inquisitor" to Babylon 5 to test Sheridan and Delenn's readiness to lead the Army of Light. The Narns onboard the station begin to challenge G'Kar's leadership.
44	22	"The Fall of Night"	Janet Greek	J. Michael Straczynski	August 15, 1995 (UK); November 1, 1995 (US)	222
The command staff are caught between a rock and a hard place when Sheridan agrees to give sanctuary to a Narn warship, while EarthForce attempts to placate the increasingly aggressive Centauri Republic. The Nightwatch begins to expand their influence on the station.

=== Season 3: Point of No Return (1995–1996) ===
Earth's government continues to become more xenophobic, while on Babylon 5, Sheridan and Delenn, who become romantically involved during the course of the season, create a "conspiracy of light" to try to reveal the truth behind the Shadows' influence. Historically tense relations between Earth and its Mars colony reach breaking point when Mars declares independence and Earth's government declares martial law and attacks. Sheridan, outraged, withdraws Babylon 5 from the Earth Alliance, supported by the Minbari.

The fate of Babylon 4 is discovered when Sinclair returns to the station to request Sheridan's help: Sinclair had been destined to use time travel to take Babylon 4 back in time to the previous Shadow war, where he is transformed into the revered Minbari leader, Valen, using the same device Delenn used for her transformation.

Ambassador Mollari realizes his deal with the Shadows has become dangerous and tries to sever ties with Mr. Morden, but fails. Sheridan, aided by Garibaldi, discovers that the Shadows can be fought with telepaths. The Vorlons attack the Shadows at Sheridan's insistence, but the Shadows kill Kosh in retaliation.

Sheridan's wife, presumed dead on an archaeological dig on the planet Z'ha'dum years earlier, arrives at the station and convinces Sheridan to accompany her to Z'ha'dum. The Shadows attempt to force Sheridan to join their cause, their ships threatening Babylon 5. Sheridan, guided by Kosh's words, flies a vessel loaded with explosives into the planet while jumping into a large chasm. The Shadow ships withdraw, but Garibaldi, deployed to defend the station, does not return.

No. overall	No. in season	Title	Directed by	Written by	Original release date	Prod. code
45	1	"Matters of Honor"	Kevin G. Cremin	J. Michael Straczynski	November 6, 1995	301
The Babylon 5 crew is presented with a new weapon with which to fight the growing Shadow threat. An official from EarthForce comes to the station to investigate Lt. Keffer's recording.
46	2	"Convictions"	Mike Vejar	J. Michael Straczynski	November 13, 1995	302
A series of random bombings rocks the station and threatens the crew and the ambassadors. A group of monks from Earth arrives on the station.
47	3	"A Day in the Strife"	David J. Eagle	J. Michael Straczynski	November 20, 1995	303
The Babylon 5 crew makes contact with a strange alien probe. G'Kar's standing among the Narn is threatened from without and within.
48	4	"Passing Through Gethsemane"	Adam Nimoy	J. Michael Straczynski	November 27, 1995	305
A kindly monk finds himself assailed by strange objects and previously hidden memories. Lyta Alexander returns to Babylon 5.
49	5	"Voices of Authority"	Menachem Binetski	J. Michael Straczynski	January 29, 1996	304
Ivanova and Marcus go searching for the First Ones with the help of Draal. Sheridan comes under the scrutiny of the Nightwatch as well as Babylon 5's new "political officer".
50	6	"Dust to Dust"	David J. Eagle	J. Michael Straczynski	February 5, 1996	306
The "Conspiracy of Light" is jeopardized when Bester comes to Babylon 5 to find a dealer of the telepathy-inducing drug Dust, one who has made G'Kar's acquaintance...
51	7	"Exogenesis"	Kevin G. Cremin	J. Michael Straczynski	February 12, 1996	307
Franklin and Marcus investigate an outbreak of parasitic aliens in Down Below. Ivanova is tasked with determining whether Lt. Corwin is suitable for the "Conspiracy of Light".
52	8	"Messages from Earth"	Mike Vejar	J. Michael Straczynski	February 19, 1996	308
A startling revelation leads Sheridan and Delenn on a dangerous mission into Earth Alliance space. The Nightwatch expands its influence over Babylon 5.
53	9	"Point of No Return"	Jim Johnston	J. Michael Straczynski	February 26, 1996	309
When President Clark dissolves Earth's Senate and declares martial law throughout the Earth Alliance, the command crew must find a way to stop Nightwatch from taking over Babylon 5. Londo receives a prophecy from Emperor Turhan's widow when she visits the station.
54	10	"Severed Dreams"	David J. Eagle	J. Michael Straczynski	April 1, 1996	310
President Clark tries to seize control of Babylon 5 by force, forcing Sheridan and the command crew to declare Babylon Five an independent state, breaking away from Earth Alliance, and taking arms against Clark's government. Delenn confronts the Grey Council.
55	11	"Ceremonies of Light and Dark"	John C. Flinn III	J. Michael Straczynski	April 8, 1996	311
Delenn tries to organize a Minbari religious ceremony to help the command crew and the ambassadors to adjust to their new situations. Remnants of Nightwatch attempt to undermine Sheridan's control of Babylon 5. Londo confronts Lord Refa.
56	12	"Sic Transit Vir"	Jesus Trevino	J. Michael Straczynski	April 15, 1996	313
Vir faces calamity when his fiancée – whom he has never met – arrives on the station, and his "work" as the Centauri ambassador to Minbar is revealed.
57	13	"A Late Delivery from Avalon"	Mike Vejar	J. Michael Straczynski	April 22, 1996	312
A traveller arrives on the station, claiming to be King Arthur. Sheridan and Ivanova try to gain recognition of the station's new status among the alien governments.
58	14	"Ship of Tears"	Mike Vejar	J. Michael Straczynski	April 29, 1996	314
Bester returns to Babylon 5 with secret information about a weapons supply ship and proposes an alliance.
59	15	"Interludes and Examinations"	Jesus Trevino	J. Michael Straczynski	May 6, 1996	315
The Shadow War begins in earnest, and it falls to Sheridan to rally a force against the Shadows. He requests help from Kosh, which brings profound consequences. Franklin deals with his stim addiction.
60	16	"War Without End (Part 1)"	Mike Vejar	J. Michael Straczynski	May 13, 1996	316
Jeffrey Sinclair returns with a mission vital to the survival of the station: traveling back in time to steal Babylon 4.
61	17	"War Without End (Part 2)"	Mike Vejar	J. Michael Straczynski	May 20, 1996	317
The mission to send Babylon 4 where it's needed continues. Sinclair's destiny is revealed. Sheridan sees what will happen to Centauri Prime in the future. Zathras explains who the "One" is.
62	18	"Walkabout"	Kevin G. Cremin	J. Michael Straczynski	August 18, 1996 (UK); September 30, 1996 (US)	318
Franklin continues his walkabout through Down Below. A replacement Vorlon arrives on the station. Sheridan is determined to score a victory against the Shadows using his newfound advantage.
63	19	"Grey 17 Is Missing"	John C. Flinn III	J. Michael Straczynski	September 1, 1996 (UK); October 7, 1996 (US)	319
Garibaldi investigates an abandoned level of the station. Delenn is installed as head of the Rangers, but Neroon doubts her worthiness.
64	20	"And the Rock Cried Out, No Hiding Place"	David J. Eagle	J. Michael Straczynski	September 8, 1996 (UK); October 14, 1996 (US)	320
A delegation of religious leaders comes to Babylon 5 to visit Brother Theo and to provide assistance to Sheridan. Londo sets a plan in motion to rid himself of Lord Refa.
65	21	"Shadow Dancing"	Kim Friedman	J. Michael Straczynski	September 15, 1996 (UK); October 21, 1996 (US)	321
The Army of Light prepares to engage the Shadows in the biggest battle of the war yet. Franklin's walkabout comes to a bloody conclusion.
66	22	"Z'ha'dum"	Adam Nimoy	J. Michael Straczynski	September 22, 1996 (UK); October 28, 1996 (US)	322
Sheridan's wife, who supposedly died four years ago, tries to convince Sheridan to come to Z'ha'dum and meet his opposite number. Londo receives important news about his political future. The Shadows move against Babylon 5 itself.

=== Season 4: No Surrender, No Retreat (1996–1997) ===
Sheridan returns from Z'ha'dum with the help of a strange being known as Lorien, who has given Sheridan 20 more years to live. The Vorlons alarm the other races when they begin destroying entire planets that have been influenced by the Shadows. Mollari, fearing the Vorlons will destroy Centauri Prime, destroys the Shadow base there and executes Mr. Morden. Sheridan learns that the Vorlons and Shadows were tasked as caretakers for younger races in the galaxy, but due to profound differences in ideology have been at war for eons, using the younger races as pawns in a proxy war. With the help of other ancient races, Sheridan convinces the Vorlons and Shadows to leave and cease interfering with the younger races.

Garibaldi returns to Babylon 5, with no explanation for his disappearance. He has unexplained changes in behavior and distances himself from the command staff, resigning and relocating to Mars to work with tycoon William Edgars. He also subdues Sheridan, allowing the latter to be kidnapped. It is revealed that Garibaldi was co-opted by the Psi-Corps to spy on Edgars, who is found to be developing a virus to destroy telepaths.

With the Vorlons and Shadows gone, Earth's totalitarian government attempts to use the captured Sheridan as a propaganda tool, but Garibaldi—now free from Psi-Corps influence—rescues him. A brief civil war breaks out on Earth, culminating in President Clark's suicide and Sheridan's surrender to Earth forces. Ivanova is critically injured in the war, and leaves the station to take command of her own vessel.

The League of Non-Aligned Worlds are reorganized into an Interstellar Alliance with Earth, Minbar, Narn, and Centauri acting as a United Nations across the galaxy, with the Rangers as their enforcers. Sheridan is made president of the Alliance, and he and Delenn marry.

No. overall	No. in season	Title	Directed by	Written by	Original release date	Prod. code
67	1	"The Hour of the Wolf"	David J. Eagle	J. Michael Straczynski	November 4, 1996	401
Ivanova, Delenn and Lyta travel to Z'ha'dum to search for Sheridan, while G'Kar ventures out to search for Garibaldi. Londo finds that the political climate on Centauri Prime has worsened under the rule of Cartagia, the insane emperor.
68	2	"Whatever Happened to Mr. Garibaldi?"	Kevin James Dobson	J. Michael Straczynski	November 11, 1996	402
G'Kar and Marcus continue searching for Garibaldi, pursued by agents of the Centauri. Sheridan tries to return to "life" with the help of the mysterious being Lorien.
69	3	"The Summoning"	John McPherson	J. Michael Straczynski	November 18, 1996	403
Zack gets a lead on rescuing Garibaldi from his unknown captors. Delenn faces opposition from the League of Non-Aligned Worlds when she tries to reorganize the Army of Light.
70	4	"Falling Toward Apotheosis"	David J. Eagle	J. Michael Straczynski	November 25, 1996	404
As the first step toward ending the war, Sheridan decides to act against the new Vorlon ambassador. G'Kar faces torture at the hands of Cartagia.
71	5	"The Long Night"	John Lafia	J. Michael Straczynski	January 27, 1997	405
Sheridan continues putting the pieces in place for his final strike against the Shadows and the Vorlons, while Londo and Vir make the final preparations for assassinating Emperor Cartagia.
72	6	"Into the Fire"	Kevin James Dobson	J. Michael Straczynski	February 3, 1997	406
At the height of the Shadow War, Sheridan stages a final showdown between the Vorlons and the Shadows at Coriana 6.
73	7	"Epiphanies"	John C. Flinn III	J. Michael Straczynski	February 10, 1997	407
Garibaldi resigns his position. Bester returns with the news that Earth Alliance plans to isolate and discredit Babylon 5.
74	8	"The Illusion of Truth"	Stephen Furst	J. Michael Straczynski	February 17, 1997	408
The command crew take a chance when an ISN reporter arrives on the station, claiming that he wants to do an objective and truthful story on Babylon 5.
75	9	"Atonement"	Tony Dow	J. Michael Straczynski	February 24, 1997	409
Delenn must return to Minbar and justify her relationship with Sheridan to her people, and makes an important discovery in the process. Sheridan sends Marcus and Franklin to Mars.
76	10	"Racing Mars"	Jesus Trevino	J. Michael Straczynski	April 21, 1997	410
Franklin and Marcus arrive on Mars to begin coordinating with the resistance. The rift between Sheridan and Garibaldi grows wider.
77	11	"Lines of Communication"	John C. Flinn III	J. Michael Straczynski	April 28, 1997	411
Franklin and Marcus attempt to persuade the Mars Resistance to assist Sheridan in opposing President Clark. Delenn learns of the Drakh and of increasing caste tensions on Minbar.
78	12	"Conflicts of Interest"	David J. Eagle	J. Michael Straczynski	May 5, 1997	412
Garibaldi begins working for a mysterious new employer. Sheridan comes up with a plan to counter President Clark's propaganda campaign.
79	13	"Rumors, Bargains and Lies"	Mike Vejar	J. Michael Straczynski	May 12, 1997	413
Sheridan tricks the League of Non-Aligned Worlds into a new alliance. Delenn approaches Neroon in an attempt to end the Minbari civil war.
80	14	"Moments of Transition"	Tony Dow	J. Michael Straczynski	May 19, 1997	414
The Minbari Civil War comes to its fiery conclusion. Bester makes an offer to an increasingly desperate Lyta. Sheridan is compelled to act against Earth after receiving horrible news from Ivanova.
81	15	"No Surrender, No Retreat"	Mike Vejar	J. Michael Straczynski	May 26, 1997	415
Provoked by President Clark's latest actions, Sheridan leads the White Star fleet against EarthForce to liberate Proxima 3.
82	16	"Exercise of Vital Powers"	John Lafia	J. Michael Straczynski	June 2, 1997	416
Garibaldi arrives on Mars to meet his new employer, William Edgars. Lyta helps Franklin to make progress with the frozen telepaths.
83	17	"The Face of the Enemy"	Mike Vejar	J. Michael Straczynski	June 9, 1997	417
Garibaldi is faced with the decision of whether or not to betray Sheridan. Franklin and Lyta arrive on Mars with their cargo of frozen telepaths.
84	18	"Intersections in Real Time"	John Lafia	J. Michael Straczynski	June 16, 1997	418
Sheridan is ruthlessly interrogated by the Earth Alliance.
85	19	"Between the Darkness and the Light"	David J. Eagle	J. Michael Straczynski	October 6, 1997	419
As Sheridan continues to suffer at the hands of EarthForce, Ivanova takes command of the fleet for their next engagement. Garibaldi tries to prove his innocence to the Mars Resistance.
86	20	"Endgame"	John Copeland	J. Michael Straczynski	October 13, 1997	420
Sheridan commands the final assault on President Clark's forces with the help of Garibaldi, Franklin, Lyta and the Mars Resistance. Marcus weighs a dangerous and vital decision.
87	21	"Rising Star"	Tony Dow	J. Michael Straczynski	October 20, 1997	421
Sheridan faces the consequences of his actions against Clark and EarthForce. Marcus makes the ultimate sacrifice. Delenn organizes the various races into a history-making Alliance.
88	22	"The Deconstruction of Falling Stars"	Stephen Furst	J. Michael Straczynski	October 27, 1997	422/501
The episode reveals the effects that Babylon 5 will have on the universe for up to a million years into the future.

=== Season 5: The Wheel of Fire (1998) ===
In 2262, Earthforce Captain Elizabeth Lochley is appointed to command Babylon 5, which is now also the headquarters of the Interstellar Alliance. A conflict arises between Psi-Corps and a group of rogue telepaths that are seeking their own homeworld after learning that the Vorlons created telepaths as weapons against the Shadows. When several telepaths martyr themselves, Lyta leads attacks against the Psi-Corps, becoming an enemy of the state.

Alliance trade and civilian ships are being attacked by an unknown force, and evidence is discovered that the Centauri may be involved. Mollari discovers that the Drakh, a Shadow-allied race, have forced the Centauri leadership to precipitate war with the Alliance, in part as revenge for Mollari's turn against the Shadows. Mollari is forced to co-operate when he becomes Emperor and withdraws the Centauri from the Alliance. Vir becomes the Centauri ambassador on the station.

Separate stories show the long-standing members of Babylon 5 making plans to leave the station: Sheridan and Delenn move to the Alliance's permanent headquarters on Minbar. Garibaldi, having relapsed in his alcoholism, is aided by Lise and the two marry and return to Mars. Dr. Franklin takes a position on Earth as head of xenobiology. G'Kar discovers he has become a religious figure and unable to stay on the station or return to Narn, exiles himself to travel the galaxy, taking Lyta with him since she is in a similar position.

Twenty years after his return from Z'ha'dum, Sheridan feels his life fading. He has the Rangers gather his old friends on Minbar for a farewell party. The next day, Sheridan attempts to leave while Delenn is asleep but she stops him to say a final goodbye. Alone, Sheridan revisits Babylon 5, now being decommissioned, before continuing to the location of the final Vorlon–Shadow encounter. Drawing his last breaths, he is met by Lorien, who invites Sheridan to travel beyond the galactic rim. Sheridan's ship is found adrift and empty some days later.

No. overall	No. in season	Title	Directed by	Written by	Original release date	Prod. code
89	1	"No Compromises"	Janet Greek	J. Michael Straczynski	January 21, 1998	502
Sheridan is targeted by an assassin in the lead up to his inauguration as President of the Interstellar Alliance. At the behest of Sheridan, Captain Elizabeth Lochley arrives from Earth to take command of Babylon 5. A group of rogue telepaths come to the station looking for sanctuary.
90	2	"The Very Long Night of Londo Mollari"	David J. Eagle	J. Michael Straczynski	January 28, 1998	503
Londo suffers a heart attack and falls into a surreal dream, where he must face his greatest fear in order to survive. Lennier decides to leave Delenn's service and return to Minbar.
91	3	"The Paragon of Animals"	Mike Vejar	J. Michael Straczynski	February 4, 1998	504
Sheridan clashes with the various member worlds of the Alliance over the Declaration of Principles. An isolated world asks for the Alliance's help in defending themselves against raiders. Garibaldi attempts to recruit telepaths for intelligence operations.
92	4	"A View from the Gallery"	Janet Greek	Story by : Harlan Ellison and J. Michael Straczynski; Teleplay by : J. Michael Straczynski	February 11, 1998	505
As Babylon 5 comes under attack by an alien race, ordinary maintenance workers Mack and Bo work to keep the station running.
93	5	"Learning Curve"	David J. Eagle	J. Michael Straczynski	February 18, 1998	506
Two Minbari Ranger trainees visit the station, Garibaldi investigates Lochley's background, and Zack investigates a murder Down Below.
94	6	"Strange Relations"	John C. Flinn III	J. Michael Straczynski	February 25, 1998	507
The command crew are put in a difficult position when a unit of Psi Cops, led by Bester, comes to the station to arrest the colony of telepaths.
95	7	"Secrets of the Soul"	Tony Dow	J. Michael Straczynski	March 4, 1998	508
Lyta becomes closer to Byron and the colony of telepaths, while Franklin investigates a secret from the Hyach race's distant past.
96	8	"Day of the Dead"	Doug Lefler	Neil Gaiman	March 11, 1998	511
Babylon 5 becomes part of the Brakiri "Day of the Dead" festival, in which people are visited by the deceased from their past. Famous entertainers Rebo and Zooty (Penn and Teller) visit the station.
97	9	"In the Kingdom of the Blind"	David J. Eagle	J. Michael Straczynski	March 18, 1998	509
Byron and the telepath colony bring an ultimatum to the Interstellar Alliance. Londo returns to Centauri Prime, with G'Kar as his bodyguard, and discovers intrigue and danger in the Royal Court.
98	10	"A Tragedy of Telepaths"	Tony Dow	J. Michael Straczynski	March 25, 1998	510
The situation between the Alliance and the telepath colony continues to deteriorate when Bester arrives on the station. Londo and G'Kar discover an old friend in the Centauri Royal Court.
99	11	"Phoenix Rising"	David J. Eagle	J. Michael Straczynski	April 1, 1998	512
The standoff between the telepaths, the Alliance and the Psi Corps ends in blood and tragedy. Garibaldi confronts his nemesis.
100	12	"The Ragged Edge"	John Copeland	J. Michael Straczynski	April 8, 1998	513
Garibaldi's relapse into alcoholism jeopardises a covert mission to the Drazi homeworld. G'Kar discovers that he has become a religious leader to his people.
101	13	"The Corps Is Mother, The Corps Is Father"	Stephen Furst	J. Michael Straczynski	April 15, 1998	514
With a pair of trainee Psi Cops in tow, Bester pursues a murderous rogue telepath to Babylon 5.
102	14	"Meditations on the Abyss"	Mike Vejar	J. Michael Straczynski	May 27, 1998	515
Lennier undergoes Ranger training aboard one of the White Star vessels, while secretly on a mission for Delenn and the Alliance. Meanwhile, the Drazi bug Londo's quarters and face the wrath of Vir.
103	15	"Darkness Ascending"	Janet Greek	J. Michael Straczynski	June 3, 1998	516
Lennier risks his life to uncover the proof needed to implicate the Centauri in the attacks on shipping lanes. Lise arrives on the station and confronts Garibaldi about his relapse.
104	16	"And All My Dreams, Torn Asunder"	Goran Gajic	J. Michael Straczynski	June 10, 1998	517
Sheridan and Delenn bring formal charges against the Centauri Republic, bringing the Centauri and the Alliance to the brink of war.
105	17	"Movements of Fire and Shadow"	John C. Flinn III	J. Michael Straczynski	June 17, 1998	518
As the war between the Alliance and the Centauri grows more intense, Sheridan must contend with rogue Narn and Drazi generals who want to take drastic action. Lyta and Franklin uncover a startling truth behind the Centauri campaign.
106	18	"The Fall of Centauri Prime"	Douglas E. Wise	J. Michael Straczynski	October 28, 1998	519
The fate of Centauri Prime is decided, between the weapons of the Alliance and the threats of the Drakh. Delenn and Lennier are stranded in hyperspace.
107	19	"The Wheel of Fire"	Janet Greek	J. Michael Straczynski	November 4, 1998	520
G'Kar deals with the 'cult of personality' that is forming around him. Delenn learns that she is pregnant. Lochley helps Garibaldi deal with his problems with alcoholism.
108	20	"Objects in Motion"	Jesus Trevino	Story by : Harlan Ellison and J. Michael Straczynski; Teleplay by : J. Michael Straczynski	November 11, 1998	521
As G'Kar plans to leave Babylon 5 with Lyta, the crew thwart an assassination attempt on Garibaldi and Lise with the help of an old ally.
109	21	"Objects at Rest"	John Copeland	J. Michael Straczynski	November 18, 1998	522
Sheridan and Delenn finally depart Babylon 5 for the IA's new headquarters on Minbar. Franklin leaves for his new posting on Earth. Garibaldi settles into his new corporate life. And Lennier makes a terrible choice and must face the consequences.
110	22	"Sleeping in Light"	J. Michael Straczynski	J. Michael Straczynski	November 25, 1998	523/422
Twenty years after the end of the Shadow War, Sheridan is approaching the end of his life and decides to gather together all his old friends one last time.

== Films ==
Title	Directed by	Written by	Original release date	Prod. code
Babylon 5: In the Beginning	Michael Vejar	J. Michael Straczynski	January 4, 1998	TNTCF2
The main plot is set ten years before the events of the series. In the Beginning depicts the events of the Earth/Minbari War from its genesis to its conclusion, as this story is being told by Londo Mollari to two Centauri children.
Babylon 5: Thirdspace	Jesus Trevino	J. Michael Straczynski	July 19, 1998	TNTCF1
When leftover Vorlon technology unleashes an ancient and overwhelming alien force, Babylon 5 is all that stands between these new enemies and the total annihilation of all life.
Babylon 5: The River of Souls	Janet Greek	J. Michael Straczynski	November 8, 1998	TNTCF3
An archaeologist brings his most recent find to Babylon 5: an orb containing one billion souls of an extinct race. When a Soul Hunter arrives to recover the souls, they escape and wreak havoc throughout the station, leaving Lochley, Zach and Garibaldi to save the station.
Babylon 5: A Call to Arms	Michael Vejar	J. Michael Straczynski	January 3, 1999	TNTCF4
When allies of the Shadows seek revenge against Earth, President Sheridan seeks aid in the unlikeliest of places in order to save his world. While a Babylon 5 film, it also sets up the spin-off Crusade, introducing the ship that this series is set on, two major characters, and its backstory.
Babylon 5: The Legend of the Rangers: To Live and Die in Starlight	Michael Vejar	J. Michael Straczynski	January 19, 2002	296737
The adventures of a crew of Rangers, who are called upon to escort a group of diplomats and end up in conflict with a dangerous new enemy known as the Hand. Conceived as a pilot for a spin-off, but this series was never picked up.
Babylon 5: The Lost Tales: Voices in the Dark	J. Michael Straczynski	J. Michael Straczynski	July 31, 2007	235024
The DVD contains two 35-minute episodes, each focusing on a particular character. Over Here: While awaiting Sheridan's arrival on B5, Lochley summons a priest from Earth to help deal with an apparently supernatural being. Over There: When a technomage predicts that a young Centauri prince will someday become the Centauri emperor and destroy humanity, ISA President John Sheridan must decide whether to assassinate the prince.
Babylon 5: The Road Home	Matt Peters	J. Michael Straczynski	August 14, 2023	—
President Sheridan begins jumping through time and between universes. Animated film for release in direct-to-video and video on demand formats.

== See also ==
- List of Crusade episodes
- The Lurker's Guide to Babylon 5
