= Babylon 5: A Call to Arms =

1999 television film directed by Mike Vejar

- TNT Promotional Poster for Babylon 5: A Call to Arms
- Genre: Space opera; Drama
- Created by: J. Michael Straczynski
- Written by: J. Michael Straczynski
- Directed by: Michael Vejar
- Starring: Bruce Boxleitner; Jerry Doyle; Jeff Conaway; Carrie Dobro; Peter Woodward; Tony Todd; Tracy Scoggins; Scott MacDonald; Ron Campbell
- Composer: Evan H. Chen
- Country of origin: United States
- Original language: English

Production
- Executive producers: Douglas Netter; J. Michael Straczynski
- Producers: John Copeland; Skip Beaudine
- Cinematography: John C. Flinn III
- Editor: Skip Robinson
- Running time: 94 minutes
- Production companies: Babylonian Productions; Warner Bros. Domestic Pay-TV Cable & Network Features

Original release
- Network: TNT
- Release: January 3, 1999

Babylon 5: A Call to Arms is a 1999 American made-for-television film and the fourth film set in the Babylon 5 universe (not including the pilot, The Gathering). It was written by J. Michael Straczynski, directed by Mike Vejar, and originally aired on TNT on January 3, 1999, as one of two films shown over the 1998–1999 season to fill in the gap between the fifth season of Babylon 5 and the spin-off series Crusade.

== Plot ==
Five years after the establishment of the Interstellar Alliance, President John Sheridan and Mr. Garibaldi rendezvous in deep space to oversee the completion of IAS Excalibur, and IAS Victory, the first in a series of prototype destroyers using technology reverse engineered from the Vorlon–Minbari technology of the White Stars. En route to the firing range, Sheridan is visited in a dream by Galen, who shows him graphic images of Daltron 7, a world destroyed by a massive attack.

An alien thief named Dureena Nafeel (Carrie Dobro) arrives on Babylon 5 in search of the Thieves Guild, to which she belongs. She is captured by their agents, and, upon revealing her credentials, is allowed to ply her trade provided she abide by their rules. In her sleep, she is visited by Galen who warns her to choose a target wisely when the time comes.

On the firing range, construction supervisor Lionel Drake demonstrates the capabilities of Excalibur's Vorlon-influenced enhanced weapons system: the ship channels energy from its entire body to capacitance and channels it in a single burst of very powerful energy; the firing, however, leaves the ship underpowered for a recovery period of one minute. During the test, Sheridan is visited by Galen in a waking dream. Galen informs him that while the Technomages will remain in hiding for another 20–30 years, they still watch the galaxy, and have learned of an impending attack on Earth by the Drakh: a vicious race formerly allied with the Shadows who seek revenge for the part humans have played in defeating them in the war, destroying their homeworld of Z'ha'dum and forming the Alliance, which thwarts their ambitions. Galen provides him with descriptions of three individuals who will meet him at Babylon 5 to assist him, but explicitly warns him never to explain his actions or mission to anyone under any circumstances.

Sheridan cuts the test short and travels to Babylon 5, where he provides descriptions to security, who quickly apprehend Dureena. Captain Anderson (Tony Todd) of the EarthForce destroyer Charon, arrives and meets with Sheridan and Dureena; all have been alerted to each other by Galen. Dureena turns out to be a refugee from Zander Prime, a world destroyed during the Shadow War by a Shadow Planet Killer; she initially blames Sheridan for his inaction, but upon learning of the Drakh, realizes that they are responsible for what occurred. The team sneaks out of Babylon 5 during the night on Charon, and they travel to the shipyards and take Excalibur and Victory out to visit Daltron 7. They arrive to find the once pristine world scorched to ruin and they discover the body of the fourth member of their party, a Drazi, on the surface. The Drazi's records indicate that Daltron 7 was destroyed by the Drakh less than a week before in a test as a prelude to their attack on Earth, confirming that the Drakh is in possession of a Shadow planet killer. Meanwhile, Mr. Garibaldi catches up to the shipyard, and reluctantly takes Mr. Drake with him in pursuit of Sheridan.

Sheridan and Anderson are approached by a small Drakh fleet, who inquire about their identities and intentions. The Drakh suddenly receive a powerful encoded message and begin to flee; Excalibur and Victory pursue them only to find the entire Drakh fleet departing for Earth. After a short battle, they escape and contact Babylon 5, informing Captain Lochley (Tracy Scoggins) to alert EarthGov to mobilize their entire fleet. Sheridan contacts Garibaldi about the fleet and informs him about a possible informant; upon realizing the transmission came from his ship, Garibaldi discovers that Drake – a Mars citizen resentful of Earth's prejudice against Mars-born citizens – is the informant. Drake is subdued and forced to release the details of the Drakh attack fleet.

Sheridan and Anderson arrive in Earth space just ahead of the Drakh fleet and organize the Earth and Alliance fleets assembled to repel the attack, and a massive battle ensues when the Drakh emerge. During the conflict, Sheridan and Anderson venture into the Shadow planet killer in search of a primary component: the device is a well defended planet-sized web of interconnecting joints filled with core-penetrating nuclear warheads. Dureena uses her guile to correctly isolate the master control hub just as Victory's weapon systems are irreparably damaged. Anderson and his crew plow Victory directly into the control hub, and the planet killer activates prematurely. The Earth and Alliance ships escape just as the planet killer destroys itself and most of the Drakh assault fleet. However, the last remaining Drakh ships bypass the defense grid and plunge into Earth orbit, releasing a black gaseous weapon that enshrouds the Earth.

On Babylon 5, Sheridan reports to Lochley that the Earth has been contaminated by a biological weapon engineered by the Shadows; experts calculate that the plague will adapt to human physiology and kill all life on Earth within five years unless a cure is found. Determined to save the planet, Sheridan turns Excalibur into a research vessel, armed with the best experts that can be found to search the galaxy for other races and technologies who may possess the knowledge that can lead to a cure. Galen arrives at the station to assist in the mission.

== Spin-off series ==
A Call to Arms acts as a sequel to Babylon 5 and a prelude to the Babylon 5 spin-off series Crusade. It introduces two prominent characters for the cast of Crusade, Galen and Dureena Nafeel, as well as the ship IAS Excalibur. The final scenes set up the basic premise of the Crusade.

== Cast ==
- Bruce Boxleitner as President John Sheridan
- Jerry Doyle as Michael Garibaldi
- Jeff Conaway as Security Chief Zack Allan
- Carrie Dobro as Dureena
- Peter Woodward as Galen
- Tony Todd as Captain Leonard Anderson
- Tracy Scoggins as Elizabeth Lochley
- Scott MacDonald
- Ron Campbell

== Novelization ==
A novelization of the film written by Robert Sheckley was published in 1999.
