= 1997 in science fiction =

The year 1997 was marked, in science fiction, by the following:

== Events ==
- The 55th annual Worldcon, LoneStarCon 2, was held in San Antonio, USA

== Births and deaths ==
=== Deaths ===
- Martin Caidin
- Mildred Clingerman
- Shinichi Hoshi
- Judith Merril
- George Turner

== Literary releases ==
=== Novels ===
- 3001: The Final Odyssey, by Arthur C. Clarke
- Diaspora, by Greg Egan
- Forever Peace, by Joe Haldeman
- Great Apes, by Will Self

=== Comics ===
- Transmetropolitan #1, by Warren Ellis and Darick Robertson

== Movies ==
- Contact, dir. by Robert Zemeckis
- Event Horizon, dir. by Paul W. S. Anderson
- The Fifth Element, dir. by Luc Besson
- Gattaca, dir. by Andrew Niccol
- Men in Black, dir. by Barry Sonnenfeld
- Perfect Blue, dir. by Satoshi Kon

== Television ==
- Stargate SG-1

== Video games ==
- Armored Core
- Fallout

== Awards ==
=== Hugos ===
- Best novel: Blue Mars, by Kim Stanley Robinson
- Best novella: Blood of the Dragon, by George R. R. Martin
- Best novelette: "Bicycle Repairman", by Bruce Sterling
- Best short story: "The Soul Selects Her Own Society", by Connie Willis
- Best related work: Time and Chance: An Autobiography, by L. Sprague de Camp
- Best dramatic presentation: Babylon 5 — "Severed Dreams", dir. by David Eagle, written by J. Michael Straczynski
- Best professional editor: Gardner Dozois
- Best professional artist: Bob Eggleton
- Best Semiprozine: Locus, ed. by Charles N. Brown
- Best fanzine: Mimosa, ed. by Dick Lynch and Nicki Lynch
- Best fan writer: Dave Langford
- Best fan artist: William Rotsler

=== Nebulas ===
- Best novel: The Moon and the Sun, by Vonda N. McIntyre
- Best novella: Abandon in Place, by Jerry Oltion
- Best novelette: "The Flowers of Aulit Prison", by Nancy Kress
- Best short story: "Sister Emily's Lightship", by Jane Yolen

=== Other awards ===
- BSFA Award for Best Novel: The Sparrow, by Mary Doria Russell
- Locus Award for Best Science Fiction Novel: Blue Mars, by Kim Stanley Robinson
- Saturn Award for Best Science Fiction Film: Men in Black
