= Civilizations in Babylon 5 =

Alien civilizations in the TV show Babylon 5

There are five dominant civilizations represented on the fictional TV show Babylon 5: humans, the Narn, the Centauri, the Minbari and the Vorlons; and several dozen less powerful ones. A number of the less powerful races make up the League of Non-Aligned Worlds, which assembled as a result of the Dilgar War, which occurred 30 years before the start of the series.

== Languages ==
There are three primary languages used on the Babylon 5 station: English and the fictional Centauri and Interlac. English is mentioned explicitly as the "human language of commerce," and is the baseline language of the station; written signs appear in all three languages. Other human and alien languages do exist in the Babylon 5 universe, though with the exception of Minbari, hearing them spoken is uncommon; when aliens of the same species are speaking to one another, the words heard are English, though it is presumed they are speaking their native tongue. Only in the presence of humans can the alien language be heard, to stress that the humans cannot understand what is being said.

The Gaim, pak'ma'ra, and Vorlons do not speak directly in English; in the case of the pak'ma'ra, either because they refuse to learn any language other than their own, or because they are incapable of making human sounds. Members of these races instead make use of real-time translation devices.

The principal human characters speak with an American accent, with the exception of Marcus Cole, who speaks with Jason Carter's natural English accent. Susan Ivanova, born in Russia, speaks with an American accent, as her character was raised and schooled outside Russia. Her father and brother have a distinct Russian accent. Various other minor human characters speak English with recognizable regional accents. Ambassadors Delenn and Londo Mollari, both alien characters, have distinct accents similar to Slavic. Delenn has actress Mira Furlan's normal Croatian accent; most other Minbari have native-speaker accents for English (for example, American for Lennier, British for Neroon). Londo's accent was developed independently by actor Peter Jurasik, and was imitated by William Forward, who played Lord Refa. Straczynski has described Londo's accent as being that of the "old school" of the Centauri Imperial Court.

== Abbai ==
The Abbai are a race from the fictional Babylon 5 universe. Their homeworld is Abbai 4 called SsumsshaA, which orbits the star Beta Pictoris in Sector 16. A peaceful, matriarchal society, the Abbai were the central force behind the formation of the League of Non-Aligned Worlds. The Abbai have had interstellar flight since the Earth year 1461.

== Brakiri ==
The Brakiri feature heavily in the episode "Day of the Dead", which deals with a mysterious Brakiri religious celebration. The Brakiri have had interstellar flight since the Earth year 2111. Brakiri are primarily night dwellers, and have a reputation among the other races as being pack rats and scavengers. The Brakiri were among the first that Shadows attacked openly in Earth year 2260. They were also among those that were under attack by the Centauri in Earth year 2262.

== Centauri Republic ==
The Centauri Republic, once a mighty empire, has grown decadent and is in a slow decline. Their homeworld is Centauri Prime, a small Earth-like planet consisting of two large continents and several smaller islands divided by large oceans of water. The planet has a population of about 3.4 billion.

The Centauri, a humanoid race similar in appearance to humans, are a proud and aristocratic people governed by an emperor and a nobility-driven senate called the Centaurum. The Centauri were the first alien race to openly contact humanity. The Centauri initially tried to convince the humans that they were a long lost colony of the Republic. This ruse failed once human scientists got access to Centauri DNA, but Centauri-Human trade and contact led to tremendous technological advancement and humanity's eventual rise as a major power. For instance, it was the Centauri who sold jumpgate technology to the Earth Alliance, allowing humanity to start colonizing interstellar space.

Centauri males of high social status typically wear their hair in Peacock-tail shaped fans, the length and style of which are determined by relative social class. Low-class Centauri males have not been seen without helmets. Centauri females mostly or entirely shave their heads. The social significance (if any) of complete versus almost-complete baldness on a female is not specified outright; however, in the televised episodes, older females are shown completely bald, and younger (up to the apparent human age range of the 30s, and often but not always unmarried) with ponytails.

The cardio-vascular system of Centauri includes two hearts instead of the single heart that humans have. The right heart is a solid mass of muscle which provides most of the force behind the body's blood circulation. The left heart is much more complex—this heart is made up of an intricate system of thousands of veins that help cleanse the blood in a manner similar to the human kidneys. The sexual organs of the Centauri are in a different location than the human sex organs. Male Centauri have six tentacle-like genital organs that extend out from the sides of the body and "fold" in over the solar plexus when not in use. The males can stretch the tentacles out to four feet.

A popular Centauri meal is a dish called spoo, which mostly serves as a running gag in the show. Spoo comes from an animal of the same name which is "regarded as [one of] the ugliest animals in the known galaxy by just about every sentient species capable of starflight" according to character Emerson Briggs-Wallacewith.

The government of the Centauri Republic is, despite it being called a republic, ruled by an Emperor and an assembly of Ministers and heads of various Houses that form the Centaurum. The Centauri Republic is reflective of many imperial cultures on Earth, although J. Michael Straczynski makes a specific comparison: "the British Empire once upon a time... It was a great military power. But slowly, as can happen, they grew content, and lazy, and gradually their own empire began to slip between their fingers".

== Dilgar ==
The Dilgar were a race depicted in the show as an aggressive, warlike society who initiated a sudden and unexplained campaign of conquest against all neighboring worlds between 2229 and 2232. Regarding all alien species as little more than animals, the Dilgar slaughtered entire populations and ruthlessly enslaved the few survivors.

A coalition between The League of Non-Aligned Worlds and the Earth Alliance reversed the Dilgar's advances and ultimately blockaded them on their homeworld. This victory established Earth, previously considered a newcomer, as an interstellar power. The cause of the Dilgar's abrupt attacks was revealed when their sun went supernova, wiping out almost the entire species. Only a single civilian colony on the planet Planthos survived the war and cataclysm.

In the episode Deathwalker, a Dilgar survivor of the war appears on the Babylon 5 station in the year 2258 and is revealed to be Jha'Dur, known to many races as "Deathwalker" because of the many extravagant war crimes she committed. Following the war, Jha'Dur secretly entered the service of the "Wind Swords", a particularly militant Clan of the Minbari Warrior Caste. She came to Babylon 5 to establish her people's legacy via an immortality serum, claiming that it was so that all races could be indebted to the Dilgar for immortality. However, it is revealed that the immortality serum required the death of a sentient being to work: Deathwalker intended to increase war, bloodshed and other atrocities among the other races. She nearly accomplished her plan: an alliance of races attempted to employ her to refine a version of the serum that did not require murder; however, her Minbari flyer was destroyed by a Vorlon warship as she was leaving Babylon 5.

The Dilgar are depicted as humanoid with pointed ears similar to Vulcans. They are designed to have somewhat longer eyes than the eyes of species such as Humans, Centauri, Minbari, Narn etc. Their pupils are vertically elongated similar to those of cats. The bridge of their nose is widened and goes up the forehead, making a v-shape rise in the forehead. The tips of their eyebrows are pointed, similar to Centauri eyebrows.

== Drakh ==
Servants of the Shadows until the older race left Z'ha'dum, the Drakh became major antagonists late in the Babylon 5 series and in its sequel, Crusade. The Drakh were users of biotechnology and were responsible for releasing a nanovirus plague on Earth in A Call to Arms. The Drakh also grow parasitic extensions of their being, known as Keepers, on their bodies. The Keepers function as remote control systems for the Drakh's conscripted servants; they attach a Keeper to a host organism as a means of controlling and monitoring the person through telepathic relay.

== Drazi ==
The Drazi race in the show was depicted as reptilian in appearance, with blue skin, thick skull bones, and no nostrils, although they are otherwise humanoid. They were a member of the League of Non-Aligned Worlds and are members of the Interstellar Alliance.

Drazi have a pouch in one of their armpits; it is actually used as a reproductive area. In Crusade, the Drazi are described as hermaphrodites.

The ancient Drazi used to live outdoors, only sleeping inside at night. As a result, Drazi houses are constructed with large balconies and a much smaller interior. The streets on the Drazi homeworld are very narrow, reflecting their long history of warfare: armoured Drazi vehicles found it impossible to invade an enemy city without first demolishing its buildings.

Every five Earth years, the Drazi have a "civil war" between two rival factions, green Drazi and purple Drazi. A Drazi's allegiance is decided arbitrarily by choosing a colored sash, either green or purple, which is then worn around their torso. There is no inherent motive or reason for the civil war at all, other than tradition. This "civil war" takes the form of a series of (usually) non-lethal contests. A group of Green Drazi on their homeworld intended to escalate to lethal violence, and was quickly followed by Green Drazi on Babylon 5. Commander Susan Ivanova ended the contest through the use of a loophole in the rules: taking the sashes of the leaders and ordering both groups to stop fighting. In the fifth season episode The Ragged Edge, a Drazi is shown wearing a sash made up of both colors on the Drazi homeworld.

The Drazi participated heavily during the Shadow war in 2260, and its later escalation with the full of entrance of the Vorlons by early 2261.

The only known major warship seen on-screen operated by the Drazi is the "Sunhawk", a small, highly maneuverable cruiser possibly designed primarily for patrols and quick hit-and-run attacks on larger targets. A Sunhawk has also been shown to have the ability to carry and launch a small one-man craft; during the battle of Coriana 6 one is seen flying vertically while firing a pulse weapon. This small vessel is designated the "Sky Serpent." In the B5 wars board game the Sky Serpent is classed as a superheavy fighter.

The Sky Serpent is heavily armored and can sustain multiple hits from enemy fire. The fighter is typically carried on the back of a Sunhawk warship and is launched only in times of battle. Several Sky Serpent fighters participated in Battle of Sector 83 during the Shadow War. The Sky Serpent is first seen in "Matters of Honor" and last seen in "Sleeping in Light".

In the "Call to Arms" tabletop wargame by Mongoose Publishing, the Drazi have numerous other craft, from small fighters up to large dreadnoughts. All Drazi craft share the same *hawk suffix and are armed with forward-firing heavy weapons.

As the series progresses (the year 2262 according to the storyline), it was revealed that the Drazi had begun several wars of aggression against weaker races. Later we see the Drazi also took part in the bombing of Centauri Prime in the series' fifth season.

== First Ones ==
The First Ones are conceived as the oldest races in the galaxy, the first to gain sentience. According to the show over the last million years most of these races were said to have gone "beyond the rim", a reference made a number of times in the television series meant to refer to the darkness that can be seen between galaxies. The rest, with the exception of the Shadows and Vorlons, were believed to have gone after the last great Shadow War that we are told occurred one thousand years ago. The story goes on to say that some races still are rumored to appear now and then and eventually it is revealed that a small number of these races (or individuals of these races) are still inhabiting areas of the known universe. A good example of this discovery was shown in the third season, episode 5 Voices of Authority wherein the characters Marcus Cole and Susan Ivanova meet the "Walkers" of Sigma 957.

== Gaim ==
The Gaim are an insectoid race and were a member-race of the League of Non-Aligned Worlds and are members of the Interstellar Alliance. Their name is a tribute to Neil Gaiman, who later wrote the episode "Day of the Dead". Gaim require an environmental suit in order to function in an oxygen / nitrogen atmosphere. The Gaim's helmet is reminiscent of The Sandman's helmet, the refurbished skull of a dead god.

The Gaim are ruled by six hive-queens who dictate the behavior of all Gaim. The Gaim never believed that anything existed outside of their home planet, N'chak'fah, for centuries due to their thick atmosphere that prevented Gaim astronomers from seeing the stars properly. The Gaim slaughtered Narn explorers immediately after they landed there in the early 2240s. When a Narn assault fleet showed up some time later, planning to conquer the planet, they met a similar fate as the explorers because for the first time in their history the Queens united to stave off the invasion.

Realizing that they faced alien enemies as well as each other, the Queens began making contact with aliens in an effort to ensure their species' continued survival. Upon appearing in the galactic scene the Gaim quickly joined the League of Non-Aligned Worlds to gain protection from the Narn. The Gaim queens generated a new caste of workers, a diplomatic caste, able to interact with other species, although they still had to use an electronic translator since the Gaim speak in a series of clicks and chirps like many Earth insects. The Gaim, for their part, set about procuring as many starship hulls and other parts as possible to begin constructing their fledgling navy. The queens of the Gaim were able to generate "boutique" chemicals and biological goods which were used to help purchase technology.

The Gaim had only been in space briefly when agents of the Shadows began making themselves apparent in the galaxy. They convinced the Gaim to go to war with a nearby xenophobic race, the Descari. The Gaim initially refused to join Sheridan's alliance against the Shadows on the basis that they had not been attacked yet and by joining with Sheridan would invite attacks. They reconsidered their position when the Vorlons destroyed a small group of Shadow vessels, thus demonstrating victory was possible.

== Goblyns ==
Goblyns are genderless mammals endowed with well-developed telepathy; their telepathic ability is apparently the only way they communicate. Their stamina and agility surpasses that of humans. Like chameleons they have the ability to camouflage themselves by taking on the texture of their surroundings while they try to mess with their victims' minds, planting suggestions in their brains with their telepathy. However well-aimed PPG blasts are just as deadly for them as other normal species. Like the Soldiers of Darkness, and the Shadows themselves, upon dying, Goblyns leave no body, only a smoking scorch mark on the ground where they perished. They apparently work for the Shadows.

They are not mentioned within the Babylon 5 show or movies.

[SOURCE: Babylon 5 comic (#6, #7)]

== The Hand ==
The Hand are an incredibly ancient race claimed by those who serve them to be more powerful than even The Shadows. They were imprisoned one billion years ago by another as of yet unidentified ancient race which was said to be a "force of light".

While the ships seen in use by The Hand in the Babylon 5 feature-length production The Legend of the Rangers are described by Minister Kafta as being "toys given to those races which serve The Hand", they are indeed still very powerful. So much so that they are even capable of destroying an entire colony along with several other Interstellar Alliance ships with relative ease. At no point has an actual member of The Hand's race ever been seen, nor has their age or connections with any other First Ones race been revealed. It is known that a pyramid located within a city buried eight miles beneath the surface of the planet Beta Durani 7 contains a portal that leads to another dimension. The expedition studying the billions of years old city sent a probe through which returned "distorted beyond recognition". It turns out that the portal leads to the dimension where The Hand was imprisoned ages ago and it was shortly after this discovery that servants of The Hand destroyed the colony on the planet's surface along with the Interstellar Alliance ships with their "toys".

The Hand is behind the events of The Legend of the Rangers, but are not mentioned in any other Babylon 5 media. However, according to the Vorlon and Shadow Sourcebook and other Factbooks, The Hand might refer to Vorlon and other First Ones who were taken over by the thirdspace aliens when the Vorlons first opened the Gateway to their dimension. These sources make clear that after the Vorlons opened the Gateway, thirdspace aliens (the Walkers routinely visit thirdspace as part of their long standing mission to catalog all things and quickly leave when noticed by the thirdspace aliens) poured out of the Gateway destroying and enslaving the nearby Vorlons. With each battle the thirdspace aliens would enslave more minds thus increasing the numbers in their zombie-like First One fleet. They continued to make inroads into the galaxy, conquering more and more territory and enslaving and destroying attacking fleets. Eventually all of the other First Ones, Lorien's species, the Speakers, and even the Shadows had to join the Vorlons in their fight to hold back the onslaught. After shifted their strategy from directly manning their ships to building automated ships that operated remotely or autonomously, the various First Ones and Speakers slowly pushed the thirdspace aliens and their enslaved army back to their initial beachhead at the Gateway. It was there that the invaders were eventually defeated in a great battle. However, those still in their thrall hid the Gateway. It is possible that The Hand represents those First Ones still in thrall to the thirdspace aliens or perhaps they represent the thirdspace aliens themselves.

== Humans ==
=== Earth Alliance ===
The Earth Alliance was a major galactic superpower in the Babylon 5 universe. The name of its military force EarthForce. Earth-Alliance had gained more technology than any other race in the known Babylon 5 universe: Dilgar, Narn, Centauri, Shadow, Minbari, and Vorlon tech all at one point in time.

It was founded at the end of the twenty-first century, after the Third World War: first as a loose coalition of nations, then as a tight alliance of nearly every nation on Earth as well as Alliance-controlled colonies throughout the Galaxy, though colonial populations have had a history of independence driven rebellion, especially Mars. The Alliance is a unicameral representative democracy under the leadership of an elected President with a strong military. In one second-season episode ("And Now For a Word"), the Alliance is said to consist of 24 outposts and colonies in over a dozen solar systems.

Since the end of the Earth-Minbari War, the Alliance had prospered in interstellar trade, though some influential factions had become increasingly xenophobic and isolationist. Following the assassination of President Luis Santiago, the new President, Morgan Clark, formed Nightwatch (a pervasive secret police) and dissolved the Senate, turning Earth and her colonies into a totalitarian fascist state.

=== Psi Corps ===
The Psi Corps is an agency of the Earth Alliance responsible for all humans with telepathic or other para-psychological abilities anywhere within Earth-controlled space. All persons with Psi abilities are required to either join the Corps, face lifetime imprisonment, or submit to a lifetime of drug treatments to suppress their abilities. Prolonged treatment with these drugs has a depressing effect. Psi Cops are members of a para-military body enforcing laws related to telepaths and operates with few checks against their authority.

The Corps was originally established to protect, nurture and train humans with Psi abilities, and to protect the mundane population from possible abuse or criminal activities by talented individuals. The Psi Corps' headquarters has hospitals, offices and a boarding school where young people possessing telepathic and telekinetic power (known colloquially in the series as teeps and teeks) can develop without the fear and persecution they would face among the normal population (referred to by psychics in the series as mundanes).

At some point the Corps realized that it could not be controlled by any external authority, and the Corps developed into a fascist state-within-a-state, pursuing its own agenda using the Psi Cops and other means, and taking an active role in Earth politics. By the time of the pilot movie, Babylon 5: The Gathering, the Corps has degenerated to the point where many potential and former members prefer a life on-the-run as rogue psychics (referred to by the Corps as blips) to the safety and comfort of living and working under its wing.

After the colony on Babylon 5 was forced to leave, Lyta Alexander began a crusade against the Psi Corps. Her actions led to a war in which rogue telepaths and non-telepaths fought the Psi Corps. The old Psi Corps was destroyed, and a new Psionic Monitoring Commission was built to replace it. Once the Telepath War was over, the Psionic Monitoring Commission dedicated itself to hunting down those members of the Corps who committed war crimes, such as Alfred Bester. Bester was eventually captured and sentenced to spend the rest of his life in prison with his abilities taken away by drugs. Many private schools were founded to educate telepaths; they met with mixed success. Telepaths were allowed a much wider range of options as far as their lives were concerned. Rather than having to join the Psi Corps, they were able to do almost anything they wanted. This included joining the Earth Alliance military and working for private organizations.

=== Technomages ===
The Technomages are a group of sentient beings. The technomages shown in the television series are primarily human, but in the "Technomage Trilogy" books, apprentices and mages of other races including Centauri are named. They are described as using "science to create the appearance of magic". Galen, a Technomage, was a regular character on the spin-off series, Crusade.

In the "Technomage Trilogy" of Babylon 5 novels, it is revealed that the technology in question consists of bio-technological implants, and that the process of installing the implants and adjusting to them is excruciatingly painful. The presence of these implants means that technomages are effectively cyborgs. Eventually it is also revealed that the technology was supplied by the Shadows who originally had plans to turn them into warriors of chaos and destruction. Unbeknownst to all but a few technomages, these technorganic implants were created by kidnapping a member of the same species as a candidate and using their body as an incubator; this process was excruciatingly painful, took years to complete, and culminated in the implants being forcibly extracted from the incubator resulting in their death. This was first done on the young of a race of similar age to the Minbari who were called the Taratimude, who eventually became extinct, but not before spreading the Technomage order to other races including humans.

Technomages are shown to have many different powers over the course of both Babylon 5 and Crusade. Such powers include being able to cast a shield around their bodies to absorb damage or contain atmosphere in hostile environments, hurl fireballs, generate holograms, cloak themselves in invisibility, and establish real-time communication with another Technomage regardless of distance. Technomages may choose to establish a "place of power" for themselves, such as a particular planet. In doing so, they develop a strong connection with that place, and to some extent, a dependency on that connection.

Through the course of the "Technomage Trilogy", Galen and Isabelle uncover several energetic, primal abilities that underlie the conventional mage abilities and relate to their connection with the Shadows. Isabelle discovered a spell that allows mages to intercept the communications sent to Shadow agents like Morden or the Drakh.

The Primal Abilities of the Technomage Implants are as follows. Invisibility, Communion with the Shadows ("base" for the Communication spell), Shadow Skin (a type of energy shield), Destruction Sphere ("base" of the Fireball "spell"), Healing, Access to "Tech" outside of the Mage, and a type of energy blast (Access to "Inner Tech"). Galen stated these were the only ones he's discovered, bringing the "Base" or Primal spell count to seven.

== Hyach ==
The Hyach were members of the League of Non-Aligned Worlds and are members of the Interstellar Alliance. The Hyach are humanoid, though they are slightly shorter on average than a human and have bald, lumpy heads. They are a gerontocracy, with the eldest among them ruling since they have the wisdom to govern.

The Hyach birth rate is declining due to the death of the Hyach-doh centuries ago, who co-inhabited the same world as the Hyach. Modern Hyach are deeply ashamed of this genocide and forbid mentioning it or the Hyach-doh to offworlders. The problem is they need to crossbreed with the Hyach-doh, since the Hyach-doh provide essential genetic information to propagate the Hyach race. Scientists of the Interstellar Alliance are at work attempting to fix the problem and save the race.

== Markab ==
The Markab were members of the League of Non-Aligned Worlds until the species largely became extinct in 2259 due to the Drafa Plague. As was noted during an Earthforce broadcast of the incident, "There may still be some isolated colonies or outposts, but for all intents and purposes the Markab are a dead race."

== Minbari Federation ==
The Minbari are the most advanced race amongst the five major races after the Vorlons. Their homeworld is the planet Minbar. Babylon 5 creator J. Michael Straczynski named the planet and race after the Islamic pulpit known as a minbar.

They were one of the military forces of the younger races in the previous Shadow War (the Vorlons being the main force) which took place roughly in the Earth year 1260 A.D. The Minbari were completely defeated by the Shadows in this first war and on the verge of total extinction but were saved by the Earth Babylon 4 station. The Minbari Federation is a caste society, its people divided into worker, warrior, and religious castes. The Minbari are led by the Grey Council, which contains nine representatives, originally three from each of the three castes. The council was disbanded by Ambassador Delenn as part of an effort to fight the Shadows. She later reorganized it, giving the Worker Caste (which had previously been caught in the middle of the power struggle between the Warrior and Religious castes) a substantial increase of power and influence. Minbari are humanoid, usually thin and pale, though considerably stronger in hand-to-hand combat than the average human of the same size; they are bald, with gray bony crests across the back of their heads. The first encounter between Minbari and Humans was a disaster—a misunderstanding led to Earth ships firing on Minbari ships, killing their leader Dukhat and precipitating the Earth-Minbari War. Shortly before reaching Earth, the Minbari surrendered and retreated. At the time the official reason for this reprieve was unknown.

The Minbari do not believe in any individual God or gods. They instead believe that the universe itself is sentient and that it "broke itself into pieces to study every aspect of its being" as is stated in many episodes through the entire series. They use base-eleven mathematics and believe the number "3" to be sacred.

== Narn Regime ==
Another "young race" like humanity, the Narn Regime were previously occupied and enslaved by the Centauri, and bear them deep ill-will because of the brutal methods of control employed. Narns are widely perceived to be primitive and barbaric, a stereotype the Centauri engendered during their occupation.

The Narn are led by the Kha'Ri council. Their religion venerates philosopher prophets, and most Narn draw strength from various different holy writings, the most noted being The Book of G'Quan. Narns are tall and have a stocky build; they are bald, with a yellowish complexion, mottled with brown and/or green spots. Although they appear reptilian, they are in fact marsupial and at least presumably mammalian, in nature.

== Pak'ma'ra ==
The pak'ma'ra (the lower-case spelling is canonical) were members of the League of Non-Aligned Worlds and are members of the Interstellar Alliance. For religious reasons, they are dedicated carrion eaters, partly because the pak'ma'ra consider themselves superior to other races. The pak'ma'ra are generally considered stupid and lazy by members of other races, who are also generally disgusted by their eating habits. They have the reputation for scavenging not only their food but also technologies.

Loosely humanoid in form, the pak'ma'ra have tentacles around a mouth cavity containing an inflexible beak, somewhat reminiscent of the mind flayers or Cthulhu. Michael Garibaldi describes them as resembling "an octopus that got run over by a truck." As this combination renders their mouths incapable of forming words in most other species' languages, they rely on machine translation for interspecies communication. However, Durhan commented once that they refuse to learn any other language than their own. They are capable of singing what several other races considered extremely beautiful music, but only do so on religious holidays.

Until its dissolution, the pak'ma'ra were members of the League of Non-Aligned Worlds, with an ambassador on Babylon 5. They then became members of the Interstellar Alliance. The pak'ma'ra took on the role as couriers for the ISA Rangers because of the distaste other species had for them, and their tendency to be on every major world in numbers but be ignored.

The pak'ma'ra were one of the few other races to be susceptible to the Drafa Plague, though, unlike the Markab, their numbers were not threatened by Second Outbreak in 2259.

In the final episode "Sleeping in Light", Vir Cotto remarks that he and Londo had once passed a group of pak'ma'ra who were singing in their quarters, and that, "It was the most beautiful sound I had ever heard." When it was over, even the ever-stoic Londo Mollari was moved to tears.

== Shadows ==
The Shadows are the most ancient of the surviving First Ones, the second to gain sentience in the Galaxy. Their homeworld is Z'ha'dum. Within the story, the name "Shadows" was given to them by the younger races, as their true name—at ten thousand letters—is unpronounceable. J. Michael Straczynski, the show's creator, once explained that he chose the name "Shadows" because of its meaning in analytical psychology.

The Shadows are believed to be the first to discover and manipulate hyperspace. For more than a million years, the Shadows warred with the remaining First Ones, and suffered their greatest defeat ten thousand years ago. One thousand years ago the Shadows returned, and were barely defeated by the Vorlons and First Ones, led by the Minbari with the help of Valen. They dispersed throughout the galaxy, waiting for an opportunity to come back into power.

== Soldiers of Darkness ==
Carnivorous reptiles that stand at a towering 5–6 metres (16–20 ft). They are parasitic in nature, slowly feeding on the internal organs of living sentient beings. One man in the episode "The Long Dark" was reduced to a mere 85 pounds (39 kg) in weight by the time one had stopped feeding on him. They also appear to be able to control their metabolism and go for decades with little food.

When one of these creatures consumes part of a sentient, a psychic link is formed with that individual which can last years, and the creature will actually use that person to scout for it, without the victim realizing how they are being used. They also have the same light distortion/phasing ability that the Shadows have, although whether this is due to technology or a natural ability was never stated.

They are clearly sentient, as the individual seen in the episode "The Long Dark" was able to board a ship and reprogram its computer, and they are very patient. They are not invincible, however. If they can be tricked into becoming partially visible, they can be killed by multiple heavy PPG blasts at point-blank range.

According to JMS in The Lurker's Guide to Babylon 5: "[This species is] one of their lower-level types. Shadow servant, soldier of darkness. Not a Shadow, but a good, close friend of same." This group of Shadows allies is known to have participated in the first Shadow War one thousand years ago and the occupation of Narn, as both the Markab and the Narn have records of these creatures.

== Soul Hunters ==
Soul Hunters are a humanoid race. They are not really interested of the matters of other races until someone is going to die that they think is important. They can sense when a life form is going to die and if they choose to, can capture its soul at the moment of death in a transparent sphere using their equipment. This is only done to the most valuable souls such as leaders, thinkers, poets, dreamers, and blessed lunatics. They have also been revealed to be able to take several souls simultaneously, or even whole worlds. The spheres are then put in places where they are respected and worshipped. All Soul Hunters also carry with them at least some part of their own collection of souls. They usually travel alone and only gather into large groups when they anticipate large numbers of deaths. They see themselves as preservers, and believe that when a person dies his soul is lost and all the person's knowledge and greatness is lost along with it. Soul Hunters can extract souls from living people, but this goes against their own rules that state they may only take souls from those who are about to die. It is not known how other species interact with them, but the Minbari have stopped several of them from taking Minbari souls as it goes against their own beliefs.

== Streibs ==
The Streibs are a mysterious race that don't engage in diplomatic contacts with other races, but rather treat them as laboratory animals and conduct cruel experiments upon them.

Few things are known about the Streibs except that they launch raids on other worlds and sectors, capture isolated life-forms from their ships, and quickly retreat before they can be pursued. They then proceed to perform very cruel experiments upon their "samples", and presumably eliminate them when finished, notably by just spacing them.

It is unclear whether these captures are scientific experiments, intelligence gathering for an invasion, or just a cruel way for the Streibs to entertain themselves. However, the Streibs are also a proven servant race to the Shadows and so their abductions and trial and experimentation could be part of an overall scheme set out by their masters, perhaps to test the mettle of other races; whether they will serve the nefarious purposes of their masters.

The Streibs once invaded Minbari territory, but it proved a terrible mistake, as the superior Minbari fleet pursued them all the way to their homeworld and "made sure they understood the depth of their mistake" (in the words of Delenn).

The Streibs also captured Babylon 5 commander John Sheridan, but this too was a fatal mistake as the EAS Agamemnon, with the help of Delenn and Ivanova, completely destroyed the sampler ship and rescued Sheridan.

The Streibs look (and behave) a bit like the Greys of UFO folklore, although in the Babylon 5 universe, what we call Greys are in fact the Vrees. The Streibs are named for Whitley Strieber, author of Communion and other UFO-themed works.

== Thirdspace aliens ==
The Thirdspace aliens are large, octopus-like creatures. Little is known about the species, but they appear to be powerful telepaths. The aliens also have a concept they call "The One." It is not clear if this is the leader of the aliens, their deity, or perhaps a unified race-consciousness. Their philosophy is that they are the only ones worthy of existence. Thirdspace aliens are older than the Vorlons (perhaps even older than the Shadows) and possess fearsomely advanced technology. Their single-occupant fighters fire powerful fireball batteries that can cripple White Star ships with a single hit, and their warships are large cannons wrapping orb-like power sources. They are also the only species in any universe known to possess deflector shield technology.

Over a million years ago, the Vorlons built a jump gate to open a doorway to what they believed was the source of life. The gate actually opened up into the Thirdspace aliens' dimension. The aliens took control of many Vorlons with telepathy and in the ensuing battle, the Vorlons forced the aliens back into their own dimension and sealed the portal. A group of Vorlons, still under the control of the Thirdspace aliens, captured the artifact and jettisoned it into hyperspace, hoping to recover it later. The aliens were trapped in their own dimension but they waited until the time when the gate would be found and opened again.

Straczynski later confided during an interview that the Thirdspace aliens were inspired by Lovecraft's Great Old Ones, in that they are a malevolent force existing in a dimension or trans-spatial realm just adjacent to our own and that they use other species to increase their power and as servants.

== Vendrizi ==
The Vendrizi, like Drakh keepers, are symbiont life form that joins with a host. The Vendrizi symbiont is a creature less than one meter long. When a Vendrizi is joined to a humanoid host, it wraps itself around the spinal cord. Unlike the Drakh keepers, the Vendrizi symbionts do not forcefully take control of the host.

The Vendrizi symbionts' history begins half a million years ago when their species was created by an unidentified race. They were created to be living records of history. The Vendrizi have existed since that time, traveling the galaxy from one host to the next. The Vendrizi decided to go into hiding because of the growing Shadow War.

== Vorlon Empire ==
The Vorlons are an ancient and technologically advanced race, one of the last of the First Ones. Little is known of Vorlon history, but they are known to have played a significant role in defeating the Shadows in the previous great wars over the past million years. For thousands of years, Vorlons have been observing and manipulating younger races, creating the telepaths of various species, including Humanity, who, for the most part, were initially created as weapons for the Vorlon's Wars with The Shadows. Little is known about their appearance - when interacting with other races they wear complex encounter suits, for which at least one purpose seems to be to preserve their natural atmosphere. When Ambassador Londo Mollari of the Centauri Republic observed an unsuited Vorlon, he claimed to have not seen anything at all. Show creator J. Michael Straczynski has said about this that: "Londo saw what he said he saw." At least one Babylon 5 novel contradicts Straczynski's statement, saying that Mollari saw a very bright ball of energy.

== Vree ==
The Vree were one of the first races to make contact with humanity. The Vree had visited Earth fairly regularly since the 1940s. They had decided not to make formal contact, but to simply observe the humans. They kidnapped humans from time to time to perform scientific studies on them. Vree look much like Greys, the alien archetype reported in many alien sightings (as for example in the Betty and Barney Hill abduction account or the Roswell incident), and it is actually hinted in the episode "Grail" that the Vree and the Greys are the same race. The plot of that episode also features a Vree is being sued by the descendant of one of the aforementioned test subjects.

== Zener ==
The Zener are a humanoid species similar to the Strieb and the Vree. They lack mouths, suggesting that telepathic abilities are the only way they can communicate. They are able to persuade their targets by using this ability to plant suggestions in their minds.

In the episode "Ship of Tears" they were shown to be helping the Shadows prepare people for their battlecruisers with advanced cyber-technology. They were also shown to be extremely loyal to the Shadows, the crew committing mass suicide rather than be captured alive.

They were later shown to be on Centauri Prime in the episode "Movements of Fire and Shadow", helping the Drakh prepare Londo for his keeper as well as in flashbacks in the episode "The Exercise of Vital Powers".
