= Babylon 5: The Road Home =

2023 animated sci-fi film by Matt Peters

- Directed by: Matt Peters
- Screenplay by: J. Michael Straczynski
- Based on: Babylon 5 by J. Michael Straczynski
- Produced by: J. Michael Straczynski; Rick Morales
- Starring: Bruce Boxleitner; Claudia Christian; Peter Jurasik; Bill Mumy; Tracy Scoggins; Patricia Tallman
- Edited by: Craig Paulsen
- Music by: Michael McCuistion; Lolita Ritmanis; Kristopher Carter
- Production companies: Warner Bros. Animation; Babylonian Productions Inc.; Studio JMS; Studio Mir (animation services)
- Distributed by: Warner Bros. Discovery Home Entertainment
- Release dates: 14 August 2023 (United Kingdom); 15 August 2023 (United States)
- Running time: 79 minutes
- Country: United States
- Language: English

Babylon 5: The Road Home is a 2023 American animated film produced by Warner Bros. Animation, animated by Studio Mir and distributed by Warner Bros. Discovery Home Entertainment. The film was directed by Matt Peters, with a screenplay by original Babylon 5 franchise creator, J. Michael Straczynski. The film is the seventh feature film in the Babylon 5 franchise and is the second installment to be released direct-to-video (the first was the Babylon 5: The Lost Tales miniseries) although the first to be released on 4K UHD format, as well as the first animated installment. It makes use of CGI animation. The film was released on August 14, 2023.

== Plot ==
After the end of the Shadow War (but before the events of Babylon 5: The Lost Tales), President John Sheridan and Delenn leave Babylon 5 for Minbar to further develop the Interstellar Alliance. While participating in the opening of an advanced power station, John begins to feel poorly and learns the power plant uses tachyons. As in "War Without End", John becomes unstuck in time and space.

John jumps 23 years into the future to see an older Dr. Stephen Franklin. John died three years prior, but Stephen does not have the heart to tell him, and instead claims that John is 18 years in the future. Stephen's tests prove that Sheridan is out of phase in time and can end up in alternate realities. Stephen formulates a plan: find Zathras and obtain a time stabilizer. Before anything can be done, John jumps into the past.

John finds himself on Earth in the year he took over B5, at his parents' farm with his father. As he enjoys the scenery, he jumps to Z'ha'dum in 2256 during the ill-fated expedition of the Icarus and the awakening of the Shadows. John attempts to warn the expedition not to tamper with the aliens in hibernation, but is too late. The Shadows awaken and attack the expedition crew.

John jumps to an alternate timeline where he never commanded B5. The Shadows are overrunning B5 and John meets Commander Jeffrey Sinclair, quickly explaining what is happening to him. Jeffrey drafts John to make a last stand against the Shadows. Both John and Jeffrey agree that B5 is lost and the only way to save the evacuating populace of the station is to stop the Shadows by destroying B5. As John struggles to blow up B5's power core he encounters Lyta and G'Kar. John jumps before he can destroy the station, but Lyta and G'Kar complete the process. The station's explosion destroys the invasion force, saving the escape shuttles.

John finds himself aboard B5 in his correct time in Captain Elizabeth Lochley's bedroom. John convinces Elizabeth to shuttle John to Epsilon 3 to speak with Zathras. Zathras determines that John's shifting through time and space risks creating a dimensional collapse event, where all timelines will fall upon each other. Before Zathras can stabilize John, he jumps again.

John finds himself in a city on Earth in a reality where the Shadows are victorious. John finds Susan Ivanova and Londo Mollari resigned to the destruction of Earth. After losing the Shadow War, the Vorlons do not want the Shadows to have Earth and intend to destroy it by pushing the moon into the planet. As the moon descends, John jumps once more and finds himself at The Rim, the edge of space, time, and reality. He meets an entity that takes the form of G'Kar, explaining John is a threat to reality. John questions the point of his existence if he is so dangerous, but the entity explains that destroying John would defeat the great experiment of consciousness. The entity tells John that possibility is based on love and its greatness cannot be so easily destroyed. John wants to ask more questions, but jumps again.

John finds himself in a reality in which the Icarus expedition never happened and his younger self has peacefully commanded B5. John talks with his younger self and tries to explain his situation. After Lyta telepathically confirms his story, Zathras arrives to help John. When John starts to jump again, Zathras reminds him that he has influence over where he jumps based on his feelings and he thinks of Delenn. A portal opens, revealing that Delenn has been chasing after John the whole time. John joins hands with her and returns home.

== Cast ==
- Bruce Boxleitner as John Sheridan
- Claudia Christian as Susan Ivanova
- Peter Jurasik as Londo Mollari
- Bill Mumy as Lennier
- Tracy Scoggins as Elizabeth Lochley
- Patricia Tallman as Lyta Alexander
- Paul Guyet as Zathras and Jeffrey Sinclair
- Anthony Hansen as Michael Garibaldi
- Mara Junot as Reporter and Computer Voice
- Phil LaMarr as Dr. Stephen Franklin
- Piotr Michael as David Sheridan, Trudan, and Marcus Cole
- Andrew Morgado as G'Kar and Starfury Pilot
- Rebecca Riedy as Delenn

== Production ==
In April 2023, original Babylon 5 creator J. Michael Straczynski teased "Wonderful news coming", separate from the CW Reboot, after showing a new Babylon 5 logo on his social media. The film was officially announced in May 2023, with more news set to come the following week. Straczynski further said that the film is "already finished and in the can" and that "it feels the most B5-ish of anything we've done since the original show." The film's title, first-look image, voice cast, producers, and director were revealed on May 10, 2023. The film was directed by Matt Peters, who previously worked on another animated film for Warner Bros. Animation and Warner Bros. Home Entertainment, titled Batman and Superman: Battle of the Super Sons. Most of the surviving original Babylon 5 cast, with the exception of Jason Carter, who played Marcus Cole, returned to voice the characters they had previously portrayed. (The credits feature a dedication to the regular and recurring cast members who have died since the series' end in 1998.) The film was produced by Sam Register. On May 12, Straczynski gave an update about the upcoming Babylon 5 animated movie on his social media. Straczynski stated that a final update would be coming in mid-June, and would include the release date and plot summary, as well as a trailer and information on how to view the film upon its debut. Straczynski shared some first-look images of the film on June 10, 2023. A full trailer and release date for the film was released on June 15, 2023.

== Release ==
The film was released on home media on Blu-ray, 4K, and video on demand by Warner Bros. Discovery Home Entertainment on August 14 (UK) and August 15, 2023 (USA).

== Reception ==
On Rotten Tomatoes it has a score of 83% based on reviews from 6 critics. Tara Bennett of IGN Movies rated it 7 out of 10 and wrote: "J. Michael Straczynski's script stridently wears its heart on its sleeve, which will likely land for nostalgic old-timers but play a little cloying for those without prior investment." Rob Owen of the Pittsburgh Tribune-Review wrote: "As stories go, The Road Home is pretty meh, standard sci-fi fare with a sappy, humanistic overlay."
