= Thirdspace =

Thirdspace may refer to:

- Babylon 5: Thirdspace, a 1998 American made-for-television film
- Third place (also third space), the social surroundings separate from the two usual social environments of home and the workplace
- Thirdspace, a theory by postmodern political geographer and urban theorist Edward Soja
