= Carrie Dobro =

American actress

- Occupations: Actress, voice artist
- Years active: 1993–2010
- Spouse: Mark Ciglar (m. 1999)

Carrie Dobro is an American actress. She is best known for her leading role as Dureena Nafeel in the Babylon 5 feature-length film A Call to Arms and its short-lived spin-off TV series Crusade. Carrie played the character of Kulai on the ABC TV series Hypernauts. She has also guest starred on numerous other television shows such as Beverly Hills, 90210, Nightstand, Townies, Silk Stalkings, and The Young and the Restless.

She played Jenna Stannis in the new Blake's 7 audio plays.
