= Babylon 5: Thirdspace =

- TNT Promotional Poster for Babylon 5: Thirdspace
- Genre: Space opera; Drama
- Created by: J. Michael Straczynski
- Written by: J. Michael Straczynski
- Directed by: Jesús Salvador Trevino
- Starring: Bruce Boxleitner; Claudia Christian; Jeff Conaway; Patricia Tallman; Stephen Furst; Richard Biggs
- Theme music composer: Christopher Franke
- Country of origin: United States
- Original language: English

Production
- Executive producers: Douglas Netter; J. Michael Straczynski
- Producer: John Copeland
- Cinematography: John C. Flinn III
- Editor: David W. Foster
- Running time: 94 minutes
- Production companies: Babylonian Productions; Warner Bros. Television

Original release
- Network: TNT
- Release: July 19, 1998

Babylon 5: Thirdspace is a 1998 American made-for-television film that is part of the Babylon 5 science fiction universe. It was written by J. Michael Straczynski and directed by Jesús Salvador Treviño.

The movie was originally shown on July 19, 1998 on the TNT cable network, during the run of season five (originally being shown between "Movements of Fire and Shadow" and "The Fall of Centauri Prime"). In addition to members of the regular cast of the Babylon 5 TV series, it features the notable guest-stars Shari Belafonte (playing Dr. Elizabeth Trent) and William Sanderson (reprising the role of "Deuce" that he played in the episode "Grail").

The horror-based story, which ties into the Shadow/Vorlon plotline, centers on the return of an ancient and overwhelming alien force which had once attempted to destroy life in the Milky Way.

== Plot ==
An enormous artifact is discovered in hyperspace and is towed to Babylon 5 for investigation. The xenoarchaeology corporation Interplanetary Expeditions sends a representative, Dr. Elizabeth Trent, to take control of the artifact's examination.

The artifact begins to influence the dreams of many inhabitants of Babylon 5, eventually controlling many of them during their waking hours as well. These thralls, led by Deuce, first demand that the excavation be accelerated, and then become increasingly violent towards the rest of the Babylon 5 population. Dr. Trent conjectures that the artifact is a Jumpgate that takes one neither to normal space nor to hyperspace but to a "third" space (hence the movie's title). With the reluctant support of her colleague, they order the device to be turned on, without notifying Captain Sheridan.

Sheridan and Delenn visit Lyta Alexander, who, transmitting a "race memory", explains that the gate was built by the Vorlons a million years ago with a purpose that cannot be expressed in human terms except as an attempt to make contact with the gods. The Vorlons discovered that Thirdspace is a parallel universe inhabited by a violent, telepathic alien species even older and more powerful than the Vorlons that is bent on exterminating all life other than their own.

Long ago, the Thirdspace aliens telepathically converted a small army of Vorlons to fight and die for them. The ensuing battle ended in a stalemate; the non-thrall Vorlons shut down the gate, but the remaining Vorlon thralls prevented the artifact's destruction by sending it into hyperspace where it was lost but preserved (in hopes that it might one day be reawakened). Lyta then telepathically informs Captain Sheridan how to deactivate the gate.

When the device is finally reactivated, the Thirdspace aliens stream out from the portal in small fighters and begin a devastating assault on Babylon 5, obliterating large cruisers with little effort. The Thirdspace fleet is highly advanced and the single-occupant fighters possess deflector shield technology, making them extremely hard to destroy. The violent behavior of the individuals under the artifact's control is intended to disrupt the station's defenses. The struggle is ended when Sheridan uses a thermonuclear device to destroy the artifact just as the first wave of Thirdspace heavy warships begins to emerge. Once the artifact is destroyed, the telepathic influence stops and the station returns to normal. Trent, shaken by the way in which the artifact affected her, turns over her final report and goes on an indefinite hiatus.

Sheridan and the others conceal the true nature of the artifact from those who ask questions and confidently assure themselves that the incident is unlikely to occur again. In private, Lyta broods with the knowledge that the artifact was only one of many mistakes the Vorlons have made.

== Cast ==
- Bruce Boxleitner as Capt. John J. Sheridan
- Claudia Christian as Susan Ivanova
- Mira Furlan as Delenn
- Richard Biggs as Dr. Stephen Franklin
- Jeff Conaway as Security Chief Zack Allan
- Stephen Furst as Vir Cotto
- Patricia Tallman as Lyta Alexander
- Clyde Kusatsu as Bill Morishi
- Shari Belafonte as Elizabeth Trent
- William Sanderson as Deuce
- Kip King as Leo
- Floyd Levine as Alex
- Jeffrey Anderson-Gunter as Merchant
- Josh Coxx as Lt. David Corwin (as Joshua Cox)
- Judson Mills as Delta Seven
- Don Swayze as Raider Leader (uncredited)

== Story arc significance and continuity ==
Essentially a stand-alone episode, the film is set after the Shadow War (episode 406 "Into the Fire") and before war was declared with Earth (episode 414 "Moments of Transition"). The presence of both Dr. Franklin and Delenn, along with changes to Zack Allan's uniform, further place the events during or just before episode 409 "Atonement", to the extent that its continuity problems can actually be resolved.

While a stand-alone story, it does include a scene in which Zack Allan finally reveals his feelings outright to Lyta Alexander, unaware that she is being telepathically dominated and not hearing a word he says. This sheds some new light on their somewhat uncomfortable friendship and his jealousy of her relationship with another telepath, Byron, that would occur in Season 5.

In the season 5 episode "The Fall of Centauri Prime", Delenn (while talking to Lennier about themselves drifting in hyperspace) appears to refer obliquely to the events of this film by pondering "Who knows what's out there; maybe we'll find a million-year-old jumpgate left over by the First Ones."

The fictional artifact was designed by science fiction and fantasy artist Wayne Barlowe after the script was written. In the novelization, the description of the artifact does not match what appears in the film. Most notably, the artifact in the novel formed into a jump gate that was larger than the station when it became operational. In the film, however, it rearranged itself and actually decreased in size.
