= Michael Garibaldi =

- Babylon 5 character
- First appearance: Babylon 5: The Gathering
- Last appearance: "Sleeping in Light" (chronological), Babylon 5: the Road Home (by release)
- Portrayed by: Jerry Doyle
- Voiced by: Anthony Hansen

In-universe information
- Species: Human
- Home planet: Mars
- Affiliated with: Babylon 5 Security
- Military Rank: Chief Warrant Officer

Michael Garibaldi is a lead fictional character in the universe of the science fiction television series Babylon 5, played by Jerry Doyle.

== Character history ==
=== Overview ===
During most of Babylon 5's five seasons, Garibaldi is the Chief of Security on board the space station Babylon 5. He holds the rank of Chief Warrant Officer. During the fourth season he suddenly resigned as Security Chief; he then begins working for Edgars Industries on Mars, one of the largest corporations on the planet. During the fifth and final season of Babylon 5 he was the Director of Covert Intelligence, a post similar to the present-day CIA Director, for the new Interstellar Alliance. Although friendly with the other crew members, he is very much his own man.

This independence leads him into great danger numerous times during the series. Like most of the characters on the series, Garibaldi is a complex person. On the positive side he is loyal, trustworthy, brave, shrewd, thorough in his job duties, and a tough and skilled soldier with small arms, in hand-to-hand combat, or in the cockpit of a Starfury fighter. He possesses a lively sense of humor, enjoys watching old twentieth-century cartoons such as "Daffy Duck" (Duck Dodgers in the 24½th Century) who is referred to as a "household god of frustration" for Garibaldi in a conversation between Zack Allan and G'Kar, loves twentieth-century motorcycles, and generally has an easygoing, laid-back personality when he's not on duty.

However, he can also (ironically, given his suspicious nature) be too trusting of close friends and aides, and his tendency towards alcoholism and self-destructive behavior is a constant struggle for him throughout the series. Of the major characters on Babylon 5 Garibaldi is in many ways the most "down-to-earth" and "ordinary"; he often sides with the working-class humans on the station and in turn is considered by them to be a kindred spirit. He loves Italian food and often cuts secret deals with Babylon 5 dockworkers to bring expensive Italian foods onto the station. The deals are secret because of the disapproval of Dr. Stephen Franklin, B5's medical chief and a close friend of Garibaldi. Dr. Franklin disapproves of Garibaldi's love of fatty foods, although on at least one occasion he agrees to eat an Italian meal (bagna càuda) cooked by Garibaldi.

=== Early life and career ===
Michael Alfredo Garibaldi was born in the Bronx, New York, Earth. He was the son of Alfredo Garibaldi, who was an EarthForce infantryman, who retired at the rank of sergeant-major. Garibaldi was raised in the Catholic church; he would later say he was "raised a good Catholic boy". Later in life he became an agnostic but always maintained respect for the church. His grandmother was a Boston cop. Garibaldi inherited her Smith & Wesson .38 Special police revolver.

Garibaldi was an honest man. This honesty, and his refusal to "play along" with policies and actions he knew were illegal, got him into difficulties with corrupt officials on more than one occasion. During one incident, a landing pad had been rigged to explode; when it did, a close friend of Garibaldi's died. His friend's daughter blamed him for many years, and Garibaldi retreated into alcoholism.

During the bloody Earth–Minbari War Garibaldi was an infantryman (called "groundpounder" or "gropo") in EarthForce. He participated in a number of ground battles against the Minbari and managed to survive the war, a considerable accomplishment. However, his experiences led to a certain amount of distrust and dislike of pompous high-ranking officers, a fact which often got him into trouble with his superiors. However, his naturally suspicious and rebellious nature made him an excellent investigator and security officer. His alcoholism may also have been a coping mechanism stemming from some form of PTSD that he acquired during the war. Because of his bouts with alcohol & PTSD, he's often seen as a sympathetic character to fellow veterans of the war, giving them wide latitude when they commit minor infractions on his watch as B5 Chief of Security.

Garibaldi continued to have problems with alcoholism for a number of years, which got him fired from several jobs. Eventually he was able to bring his alcoholism under control. While piloting Jeffrey Sinclair over the surface of Mars, their shuttle malfunctioned and crashed. Garibaldi and Sinclair then had to trek across the planet's surface for several days in order to make it back to civilization, during the trek the two men became friends.

While on Mars, he also began a romantic relationship with Lise Hampton. She eventually broke up with him due to his repeated bouts of alcoholism and difficulties in keeping a job. However, she genuinely loved him and they continued to maintain a relationship on an "off and on" basis for nearly 15 years.

=== Babylon 5 ===
==== First 3 seasons ====
When Sinclair was picked to command Babylon 5, he asked Garibaldi to serve as chief of security. Lise refused to go with Garibaldi, and the two broke up at that point. Lise later was briefly married and had a daughter, but when she divorced her husband, Earth Alliance judges biased towards Earth natives took her daughter away from her in a trial.

Garibaldi became an excellent chief of security over the next few years. He managed to keep his alcoholism under control (he is often seen refusing free liquor and drinking water instead), and became well-liked and respected by the security forces that he commanded. As Security Chief he made it his duty to know every nook and corner of the station where criminals could possibly hide and operate, and he also worked hard to know and keep track of every leader and member of human and alien organized-crime groups on the station. His presence alone was often enough to intimidate would-be criminals and evildoers from carrying out their plans, or to confessing to their crimes.

During Garibaldi's second year, he discovered a plot to assassinate Earth Alliance President Luis Santiago. When he confronted the plotters on the station, Garibaldi was shot in the back by his second-in-command, whom he had implicitly trusted and trained. Even though he managed to let Commander Sinclair know about the assassination plot, the news came too late as EarthForce One, the President's starship, soon exploded, with the President on board.

For the next several weeks Garibaldi was in a coma and near death, despite Dr. Stephen Franklin's best efforts. Franklin explained that he felt that a person in such circumstances could come to a point where they'd lose the will to live, and the body would then stop cooperating. Franklin felt that the debate was going on somewhere inside Garibaldi's mind.

Franklin eventually decided to try an alien healing device, which he had confiscated from its previous owner, on Garibaldi. Both he and John Sheridan donated life energy, which the machine transferred to Garibaldi. Once this was done, Garibaldi eventually emerged from his coma. Garibaldi discovered that Sinclair was gone, and that Sheridan was the new commanding officer. Telepath Talia Winters was able to help him discover who had attacked him. With this information, Garibaldi's former aide was arrested. The new president, Morgan Clark, recalled the aide back to Earth, but the aide disappeared en route. Although Garibaldi was suspicious of Sheridan at first, he eventually came to trust him.

Garibaldi struggled with the decision whether to return to his job or not. He felt that being shot in the back said something about the type of security officer he was, but Garibaldi eventually decided to return. For the next two years, Garibaldi continued to serve as chief of security. He became good friends with Sheridan. When President Clark began turning the Earth Alliance into a dictatorship, and with the reemergence of the Shadows, Garibaldi became the liaison between Babylon 5 and the Anla'Shok, or Rangers, upon receiving a message from Sinclair, who had since become the leader of the organization upon being posted to Minbar, a side duty that was known to the Rangers and a select few Sinclair felt he could trust, including Garibaldi.

When Nightwatch, a sinister police force created by President Clark to expose and arrest "traitors to Earth", began to infiltrate station security, Garibaldi refused to cooperate with them. Garibaldi eventually helped to locate, identify, and capture the members of Nightwatch on the station. He then oversaw a security force that included Narn replacements. When Sheridan withdrew Babylon 5 from the increasingly fascist Earth Alliance in the episode "Severed Dreams", the station was soon attacked by a fleet of EarthForce warships loyal to President Clark. During the battle a force of Earth Marines boarded and attempted to take over the station. Garibaldi led the station's security forces in a defence of the station, after a bitter and bloody fight the invading marines were defeated and forced to surrender. Initially, Garibaldi was shown to have broken his leg during the fight. But when the actor Jerry Doyle broke his arm during filming, in the next episode he was shown wearing a sling - Garibaldi explained this as that he fractured his wrist and forearm during the fight, but had initially not thought it bad enough to let Dr. Franklin put it in a cast.

==== Season 4 ====
When the year came to the end, Sheridan went to Z'ha'dum. A Shadow attack force arrived at the station. Garibaldi went out in a fighter to protect the station. When Sheridan detonated the White Star - which had two fusion bombs on it - over the Shadow capital city, the force withdrew. Garibaldi was taken on board a Shadow vessel.

The Shadows used Psi-Corps personnel to reprogram humans. Alfred Bester diverted Garibaldi's transport to a Psi-Corps facility of his choosing, and spent the next two weeks carefully reprogramming him to uncover a conspiracy against the telepaths. After ensuring he remembered nothing, he was released unconscious onto an empty ship near Babylon 5. At about the same time, a revived Sheridan came back to Babylon 5.

During the buildup for the final attack on the Shadows, Garibaldi's mood changed. While he returned to duty as security chief, Garibaldi no longer had any enthusiasm for the job. Zack Allan thought that he had just been through a lot and he would recover sooner or later.

After the Shadow War was over, Garibaldi received a coded message that activated his programming. He resigned from his job as chief of security to work as an independent investigator over the next several months, helping people find what they had lost in the war. He increasingly came into conflict with Babylon 5 staff, violently confronting Sheridan on two occasions. Garibaldi rationalized his hostility towards Sheridan as a concern that he was developing a cult of personality around him and saw himself as the second coming.

He was recruited by William Edgars' anti-Sheridan right-hand-man, known only as Wade, to work for the mega-corporation Edgars Industries. Garibaldi gained some initial trust in the organization by smuggling several valuable items destined for Mars through Babylon 5 customs. It was then that he learned that Lise had married William Edgars. Garibaldi demanded a face-to-face meeting on Mars with Edgars himself, wanting to know what he was involved in. When President Clark began attacking civilian targets, Sheridan declared his intent to remove Clark by any means necessary. Edgars agreed to bring Garibaldi into the inner circle if he arranged Sheridan's capture. Knowing Sheridan's weaknesses, Garibaldi provided medical details that allowed Sheridan's fugitive father to be captured. He then contacted Sheridan to offer help in rescuing his father, provided that he came to Mars alone. Still having some trust in Garibaldi, Sheridan fell into the trap. With Sheridan captured, Edgars informed him of the plot to release a virus contagious to human telepaths only. Psi-Corps agents moved in swiftly.

At this point, Bester came to Garibaldi and released him from his conditioning. Bester had only needed to adjust Garibaldi's personality subtly, increasing his natural suspicion and mistrust of authority. Bester admitted that some of Garibaldi's actions, such as quitting his post as head of security for Babylon 5, had surprised him.

Garibaldi, captured by the Martian resistance movement, was only able to avoid execution with Lyta Alexander's help. He helped Dr. Franklin and Lyta free Sheridan, and got him safely back to the fleet. Sheridan then took command of the EAS Agamemnon, and set the fleet on course for Mars.

Garibaldi remained behind on Mars. He helped take control of a bunker at the Earth Alliance base. From there, Lyta Alexander was able to activate the weaponized telepaths that had been smuggled on to the Earth Force ships.

After the battle of Earth was over, Garibaldi went looking for Lise. With the help of several Rangers, he was able to rescue Lise from the Martian Mafia. He then stayed with Lise for several days. At that point, with the consent of Lise, Garibaldi decided to return to Babylon 5 for one year to help Sheridan in the founding years of the Interstellar Alliance.

==== Season 5 ====
===== Head of Covert Intelligence =====
Garibaldi arrived at Babylon 5 shortly before Sheridan and Delenn returned. With the help of Dr. Franklin, he arranged a party for Sheridan, even though Sheridan had told him he didn't want that.

Soon new Babylon 5 commander Capt. Elizabeth Lochley arrived. Garibaldi helped with security for Sheridan's inauguration. Despite threats to his life, Sheridan decided to go ahead with the ceremony, and Lochley agreed. Garibaldi followed her out of the President's office, and angrily confronted her about her decision. Lochley told him that, as he wasn't actually part of the Alliance or Babylon 5 staff, his opinions didn't count for too much. Garibaldi found the assassin and killed him before he could kill the President. After that, Garibaldi spoke to Sheridan about what Lochley had said, at which point Sheridan made him the Head of Covert Intelligence for the Alliance.

Garibaldi initially recruited several rogue telepaths to assist in intelligence gathering operations. This was followed by finding out that part of the Centauri government were behind attacks on ships.

When Bester arrived on Babylon 5, Garibaldi tried to take his revenge against him. He first stormed in on a meeting between Lochley and Bester. Lochley had him arrested. Even though Sheridan angrily confronted her later about it, she stood by her decision. During a later visit, Garibaldi walked into Bester's quarters with a phased plasma gun, intending to shoot him, but discovered that Bester had done some further programming. Bester described it as "hitting him with an Asimov"—Garibaldi could want to kill Bester all he wanted, but he could not actually kill Bester, or through inaction allow Bester to come to harm, similar to Asimov's first law of robotics.

Shortly after this, Garibaldi began drinking again. He had done this in order to gain a sense of control over his life once again. However, the drinking would have serious consequences, not only for Garibaldi, but for many others as well. It resulted in the death of a pilot who had information on the Centauri attacks. Garibaldi's performance began to decline. Lise arrived on the station and found out about his drinking. Even though she tried to help him, Garibaldi didn't stop.

Eventually, Sheridan found out. While initially angry at Garibaldi, Sheridan was calmed down by Delenn. Sheridan was disappointed that Garibaldi didn't feel that he could go to Sheridan with his problems. When Garibaldi told Sheridan that he had been drinking for a couple months, Sheridan said that is about what he had suspected, but had tried to deny what was going on. With no other choice, Sheridan suspended Garibaldi.

Lochley also confronted him. When Garibaldi told her she didn't understand what he was going through, she revealed that she did. Not only did her father have alcoholism, but she had been addicted herself to a variety of drugs during her teen years. Lochley got Lise to return to Babylon 5 to help support Garibaldi.

When Lise returned, Garibaldi decided that the time had come for him to leave. Lise wanted him to help run Edgars Industries, and to give him a good life. He suddenly realized that he had a way to solve two major problems. Using his influence, he got Lyta Alexander released from jail and offered to funnel money and resources to her to finance her fight against the Psi-Corps. In return, she would remove Bester's programming, so that Garibaldi could try to "nail that sucker's head against the wall". She agreed to do that in two years if he was able to get her the funds. He also found out that the entire board of Edgars Industries was trying to have him and Lise assassinated.

Garibaldi soon married Lise. He then took over the day-to-day operations of the company. With the new Head of Covert Intelligence Tessa Holloran - the former Number One of the Mars resistance - Garibaldi was able to find out all sorts of useful information about the board. He not only fired the entire board, but he told them if any board member had either him or his wife killed, there was money set aside for bounty hunters to take them all out. He told them to leave the cigars.

Soon, Garibaldi and Lise left for Mars. He told Sheridan and Delenn that he had never expected to live that long—he had been sure for a long time that his tenure on Babylon 5 would end with him face down somewhere in Brown Sector.

=== Head of Edgars Industries ===
Upon arriving on Mars, Garibaldi began shaking up the company. He found a certain few of the troublemakers, and made them all new members of the board. Garibaldi told them that he wanted to know if he was making a mistake, and that they needed to stand their ground with him. If they were right, they'd get a bonus. If not, he told them, he'd have them for lunch.

In the following months, Garibaldi began a review of Edgars Industries. He retained all the worthwhile projects and exposed the company's black projects.

While no longer an official with the Interstellar Alliance, Garibaldi remained friendly with Sheridan and the others, and would assist them on numerous occasions. Several years later, he helped build the new Victory-class destroyer vessels. While there had been a great deal of problems integrating Earth and Minbari technology, two vessels were built, the prototypes Victory and Excalibur. While the Victory was destroyed in the Drakh attack on Earth, the Excalibur was able to help find the cure for the disease the Drakh spread on Earth.

In three novels - the last book of the Psi Corp trilogy, and the last two books of the Centauri Prime trilogy - the authors explored the period between the end of Babylon 5 and Sheridan's "death" in 2281. These novels are canon and give an interesting glimpse into Garibaldi's future. In one book, Garibaldi is able to track down Bester. While he isn't able to bring himself to kill him, he does help bring him to justice. Bester spends the rest of his life in prison, with his abilities suppressed by drugs. In the other books, Garibaldi is instrumental in gathering intelligence on Centauri Prime and uncovering the machinations of the Centauri government. Later, he is able to help find the Drakh Shiv'kala after their withdrawal from Centauri Prime. As a result, Vir is able to kill Shiv'kala, and release Sheridan's son David from the Drakh keeper.

Garibaldi and his wife eventually have a daughter named Mary. By 2281, she is about 14 years old.

When Sheridan realizes that he has very little time left, he sends invitations to all his friends to come to Minbar for one last party. The invitation arrives while Dr. Franklin is visiting Garibaldi. Despite his differences with Sheridan over the years, Garibaldi says that Sheridan is his friend, and decides to go to Minbar. They share one last meal. After Sheridan is taken from the galaxy by Lorien, Garibaldi makes one last trip to Babylon 5, for the shutdown ceremony, and takes a piece of the station—a shot glass bearing the station's logo—with him before leaving for the last time.

After the episode "Sleeping in Light" Garibaldi returns to his family on Mars. When arriving home, he finds that his daughter had won a tennis match. Garibaldi's life after Sheridan's departure is mostly quiet. Series creator J. Michael Straczynski says that his ultimate fate would be much quieter than Garibaldi could have imagined.

=== Legacy ===
500 years after the events in the television series, Garibaldi and all the main players in that story are long dead. However, Daniel, a member of an Orwellian faction seeking to sever Earth from the Interstellar Alliance in the face of a looming civil war, brings back holographic recreations of Garibaldi, Sheridan, Delenn, and Franklin. He begins reprogramming the recreations to re-enact distorted and propagandized versions of historical events so that he can convince others that the Interstellar Alliance is (and always has been) evil. Daniel explains this to the confused recreations; though they are outraged, they are unable to stop themselves from re-enacting the events as Daniel directs.

While the simulations are being re-enacted Garibaldi's recreation discovers that it possesses most of the real Michael Garibaldi's knowledge and skills, including his knowledge of computer systems. Using these skills the recreation is able to hack into the rebel alliance's main computer network, finding plans detailing an impending surprise attack on the main Earth government, which he promptly sends to Earth authorities. During a break between recordings the Garibaldi recreation reveals what he's done to Daniel, just seconds before the government launches a preemptive attack on the rebel facilities. The holographic studio is destroyed shortly thereafter, prematurely starting a civil war but denying Daniel's organization the potentially catastrophic propaganda material they sought.

== Naming ==
He is named after the Italian patriot Giuseppe Garibaldi.

== Current status ==
As Jerry Doyle died in July 2016, the Michael Garibaldi character will not make any further appearances in any future Babylon 5 movies or television series. His character nonetheless lives on with an extensive further history after the end of the Babylon 5 TV series proper in the novels. His appearance in the finale Sleeping In Light is the last canonically.

== Analysis ==
Christina Francis looked at the pararells between Babylon 5 story and the Arthurian myth. She described Garibaldi as a "complicated character" comparing him to Arthurian Sir Kay.

Garibaldi's flaw of being a recovering alcoholic has been described as being quite personal for the actor who played him, who shared similar history in his real life.
