= Babylon 5: The Gathering =

1993 pilot

- The Gathering DVD Cover
- Genre: Action; Adventure; Science fiction
- Created by: J. Michael Straczynski
- Written by: J. Michael Straczynski
- Directed by: Richard Compton
- Starring: Michael O'Hare; Tamlyn Tomita; Jerry Doyle; Mira Furlan; Blaire Baron; John Fleck; Peter Jurasik; Andreas Katsulas; Johnny Sekka; Patricia Tallman
- Theme music composer: Stewart Copeland; Christopher Franke (1998 re-edit)
- Country of origin: United States
- Original language: English

Production
- Executive producers: Douglas Netter; J. Michael Straczynski
- Producers: Robert Latham Brown; John Copeland
- Cinematography: Billy Dickson
- Editor: Robert L. Sinise
- Running time: 89 minutes
- Production company: PTEN

Original release
- Network: PTEN
- Release: February 22, 1993

Babylon 5: The Gathering is the test pilot movie of the science fiction television series Babylon 5, aired on February 22, 1993. It is also the first of six feature-length films in the Babylon 5 media franchise.

The Gathering covers events which take place roughly one year before those of the first-season episode "Midnight on the Firing Line," providing a framework of backstories, political agendas, and personal relationships for some of the series' major characters.

Following the success of the movie, Warner Bros. Television commissioned the series for production in May 1993, as part of its Prime Time Entertainment Network (PTEN); the first season would premiere in the United States nearly a year later, on January 26, 1994.

== Synopsis ==
In the Earth year 2257, a multitude of humans and non-humans gather deep in neutral space at a new station, Babylon 5, which has recently become operational. Babylon 5 was built as a neutral venue for discussing and resolving issues between the five major spacefaring races of the galaxy, the humans, Narn, Centauri, Minbari, and Vorlons. Commander Jeffrey Sinclair is in overall charge of the station.

As the crew awaits the arrival of the fourth and final alien ambassador, Ambassador Kosh from the Vorlon Empire, a transport ship arrives from Earth, bearing Lyta Alexander, a human telepath who joins the station crew, and Del Varner, a civilian. Ambassador Kosh arrives two days ahead of schedule, and is on board the station less than a minute when he suddenly falls ill, apparently from poisoning. Babylon 5's chief medical officer, Dr. Kyle, conducts a medical investigation and seeks to prevent Kosh's death, while Security Chief Michael Garibaldi conducts a security investigation. Worried that, if Kosh dies, the Vorlons will attack and destroy the station, Dr. Kyle and Lt. Cmdr. Takashima persuade Lyta to perform an unauthorized mind scan on the unconscious Kosh. As she conducts the scan, Lyta sees Commander Sinclair poisoning the Ambassador. Lyta accuses Sinclair of attempted murder. A meeting of Babylon 5's Council, made up of delegates from all five races, resolves to extradite the Commander to the Vorlon homeworld for trial. Sinclair is told that he will be deported in twelve hours.

Garibaldi comes to suspect Del Varner might have been involved in Kosh's poisoning. When he enters Varner's quarters, however, he discovers Varner dead in a fish tank. Lyta enters the medical lab, where she begins adjusting some of the settings that are keeping Kosh alive; when Dr. Kyle realizes what she's doing, he tries to stop her, and she attacks him. At that moment, the real Lyta Alexander enters the room; her double escapes.

Upon further investigation in Varner's quarters, Garibaldi learns that Varner had been smuggling illegal items between systems, and that he most recently had gone to the Antares sector to acquire a changeling net: a device that can make an individual appear to look like somebody else. The crew realizes that Kosh had not been poisoned by Sinclair when he arrived at the station, but by someone using the changeling net to imitate Sinclair. Since the use of such a device would put out a lot of energy, Takashima uses the station's scanners to pinpoint an area of the station with a high concentration of unidentified energy use. Sinclair and Garibaldi head for that part of the station, just as a Vorlon squadron arrives in the vicinity of the station to pick up Sinclair for his voyage to the Vorlon homeworld.

Sinclair and Garibaldi confront the mysterious assailant. Garibaldi is injured in the firefight and Sinclair faces the assassin himself. The changeling net is disabled, revealing the assailant to be a Minbari assassin. The assassin is a member of the Minbari warrior caste and wanted to discredit Sinclair as retribution for Sinclair's role in the Earth–Minbari War ten years earlier. Sinclair asks the assassin why he did it; the assassin replies simply, "There is a hole in your mind." Sinclair, being informed that the assassin has triggered an explosive charge, manages to get away just before an explosion rips a hole in the station's hull, throwing the station off its axis and beginning to tear it apart from the inside. Takashima uses the station's stabilizers to reestablish its axis.

The Vorlon delegation, now satisfied that Sinclair is innocent, drops all charges against him. In the station's garden, Sinclair reveals to Delenn what the Minbari assassin had said about the "hole" in Sinclair's mind. Delenn claims that it is just an old Minbari insult. Sinclair, however, tells her that he had fought in the climactic battle of the Earth–Minbari War, and that there is a twenty-four-hour period in the climactic battle, just before the Minbari surrendered, which he can't account for.

Takashima declares Babylon 5 open and operational.

== Cast ==
- Michael O'Hare - Cmdr. Jeffrey Sinclair
- Tamlyn Tomita - Lt. Cmdr. Laurel Takashima
- Jerry Doyle - Michael Garibaldi
- Mira Furlan - Delenn
- Blaire Baron - Carolyn Sykes
- John Fleck - Del Varner
- Paul Hampton - The Senator
- Peter Jurasik - Londo Mollari
- Andreas Katsulas - G'Kar
- Johnny Sekka - Dr. Benjamin Kyle
- Patricia Tallman - Lyta Alexander
- Steven R. Barnett - Eric Hazeltine
- Billy Hayes - Traveler (as William Hayes)
- Linda Hoffman - Dome Tech No. 2
- Robert Jason Jackson - Dome Tech No. 3
- F. William Parker - Business Man No. 1
- David Sage - Business Man No. 2
- Ed Wasser - Guerra

== Versions ==
There are two versions of The Gathering. The original version was a TV movie aired in 1993 on the Prime Time Entertainment Network as a pilot for the series. After a four-year run on PTEN, Babylon 5 moved to TNT for its fifth and final season in 1998. Series creator and executive producer J. Michael Straczynski supervised a special edition of Babylon 5: The Gathering, which aired on TNT immediately following the new TV movie, Babylon 5: In the Beginning. Scenes were edited to move at a faster pace, allowing the restoration of 14 minutes of footage adding exposition and character development. Among the notable additions is a prophetic line spoken by Kosh when he first meets Sinclair. Lost in the special edition is a trip through the station's alien sector that some viewers felt looked too much like a zoo. Tamlyn Tomita's lines had originally been completely redubbed as the studio thought she sounded too "harsh"; the new edition restored her original performance. The original music, composed by Stewart Copeland, is also replaced with a score by Christopher Franke, who composed music for the rest of the series, played by the Berliner Symphoniker.

The special edition is included in the Warner Home Video DVD releases Babylon 5: The Gathering/In the Beginning and Babylon 5: The Movie Collection. The original version was previously available on AOL's now-defunct In2TV service, and Hulu, but is no longer available on either as of April 2014. The iTunes Store appears to carry the special edition as part of its Season 1 bundle, but not the original, despite being listed with the original air date. The original is available for streaming on Amazon.

The original version was released on DVD by Warner Home Video in Region 2. It is also included in the "Complete Collection" and "Ultimate Collection" box sets (released in the UK only).

== Changes between pilot and series ==
Many elements of the pilot were changed when the series began, giving the pilot a different feel than the rest of the series. This was most evident in the prosthetics, sets, music, and cast members. Patricia Tallman played Lyta Alexander – she was replaced by Andrea Thompson as Talia Winters – but Tallman (as Alexander) would return later in the series, first as a recurring character and then as a regular. The medical officer was Dr. Benjamin Kyle as played by Johnny Sekka, but Sekka's ill-health prevented him from joining the series, and was replaced by Richard Biggs as Stephen Franklin. The explanation used for these cast changes is that these two characters saw Kosh outside his encounter suit and thus had to be removed from duty – Kosh's secrecy is a running theme in the show.

The first officer was Laurel Takashima (played by Tamlyn Tomita), replaced for the series by Claudia Christian as Susan Ivanova. The alien characters – such as Delenn and G'Kar – appeared slightly different because the prosthetics were different for the pilot than the series. Also, Delenn was originally supposed to be a male character destined to become female at the end of season 1, but since they could not make Mira Furlan's voice male enough, they decided to play her as female throughout the series.

Ed Wasser, who played Morden in the series, appears in the pilot as Earth Alliance technician Guerra.

The duty uniforms and rank insignia were altered between the pilot and the series, as were the handheld weapons.

Sinclair's love interest (Carolyn Sykes) is replaced by Catherine Sakai.

== Critical response ==
Rowan Kaiser of The A. V. Club wrote: "To be fair to The Gathering, what it tries to do is extremely ambitious. No space opera had succeeded on American television that didn’t have Star Trek in the title. This pilot attempted to introduce at least glimpses of a fully fleshed-out universe, several different characters, an epic overarching story, its own single-episode story, and interesting political and philosophical themes. This was, quite simply, too much to accomplish in an hour-and-a-half. And the show’s first season does largely the same thing, but it has the time and space to narrow the focus on specific elements, while eventually covering much of the same ground."
