= John Sheridan (Babylon 5) =

Fictional character in Babylon 5

- Babylon 5 character
- First appearance: "Points of Departure" (1994)
- Last appearance: "Sleeping in Light" (1998)
- Portrayed by: Bruce Boxleitner
- Voiced by: Bruce Boxleitner

In-universe information
- Species: Human
- Family: Elizabeth Sheridan (sister)
- Spouses: Elizabeth Lochley (divorced); Anna Sheridan (widowed); Delenn (married season 4)
- Children: David (with Delenn)
- Home planet: Earth
- Affiliated with: Babylon 5, EarthForce, Anla'shok, Interstellar Alliance

John J. Sheridan is a fictional character and the main protagonist of the science fiction television series Babylon 5. He is played by Bruce Boxleitner. In the series narrative, he takes over as the military commander of the Babylon 5 station and later becomes the first President of the Interstellar Alliance.

Boxleitner joined the show at the start of the second season, replacing Michael O'Hare, whose character Jeffrey Sinclair was written out of the main cast.

== Personality ==
John Sheridan is shown as an idealistic and charismatic leader who can inspire fierce loyalty in his crew. However, he can also be stubborn, reckless, and has a sharp temper similar to his second-in-command, Susan Ivanova. Despite this, he usually keeps a cheerful and optimistic personality. The death of his second wife, Anna Sheridan, on an exploratory mission heavily troubles him when he first takes command of the station.

After returning from the dead in the fourth season, Sheridan shows a greater sense of urgency to reach his goals because he learns his remaining lifespan has been limited to twenty years.

== Conception and Character Development ==
Following the departure of Michael O'Hare at the end of Season 1, series creator J. Michael Straczynski created John Sheridan to change the narrative energy of the show. While Jeffrey Sinclair was written as a deeply introspective, mystery-burdened figure, Sheridan was designed to be a more accessible, traditional military leader who would gradually grow into a grander political role.

Straczynski noted that changing the lead characters allowed the show's arc to feel more dynamic, intentionally transitioning Sheridan from a loyal officer into a revolutionary leader.

Actor Bruce Boxleitner was chosen because his screen presence offered an immediate contrast to the more somber first season. According to Straczynski, the casting choice brought a necessary balance to the dark political themes of the series, providing a leader who felt grounded and human even as his storyline incorporated heavy mythical and messianic elements.

== Religious references ==
Throughout the show, several messianic references are made about Sheridan, with characters using terms like "the second coming" and "the messiah." In the season four episode "The Face of the Enemy," Michael Garibaldi quotes the betrayal of Jesus by Judas Iscariot when discussing Sheridan's capture.

Religious parallels also appear in the season two finale, "The Fall of Night," when Sheridan falls from a transport and is caught by the Vorlon Kosh, who appears as an angel to the human onlookers. This scene mirrors the biblical passage of Matthew 4:1–11. Sheridan is also brought back to life twice by the ancient being Lorien, first on Z'ha'dum and later on Babylon 5, building on his role as a savior figure in the series lore.

== Character history ==
=== Early life and career ===
Born to an Earth Alliance diplomat, Sheridan is a descendant of the American Civil War general Philip Sheridan. He joined Earthforce, was briefly married to Elizabeth Lochley, and reached the rank of lieutenant commander by 2245.

During the Earth-Minbari War, Sheridan served as first officer aboard the EAS Lexington. When the ship's captain was killed in a Minbari ambush, Sheridan took command. He mined nearby asteroids with nuclear weapons and lured the Minbari flagship Black Star into the trap by broadcasting a distress signal. The destruction of the flagship gave Earth its only real victory in the war, earning him the nickname "Starkiller" from the Minbari. He was later promoted to captain, commanded the Omega-class destroyer EAS Agamemnon on exploratory missions, and helped put down the Mars Riots.

=== Commands and the Shadow War ===
In 2259, Sheridan took command of Babylon 5. His assignment initially caused tension with the Minbari warrior caste due to his war record, though he soon built a close friendship with Ambassador Delenn.

When Earth Alliance President Clark begins turning Earth into a dictatorship, Sheridan uncovers a secret surveillance group called the Nightwatch operating on the station. At the same time, the ancient alien race known as the Shadows begin to move again. After Clark declares martial law and orders troops to fire on civilians on Mars, Sheridan secedes Babylon 5 from the Earth Alliance, defeating a loyalist attack force with the help of Delenn and a fleet of Minbari ships in "Severed Dreams".

Sheridan forms an alliance between the Narn, the Minbari, and the League of Non-Aligned Worlds to fight the Shadows. After learning his wife Anna is still alive but working as a mind-controlled agent for the Shadows, he travels to their homeworld of Z'ha'dum. He refuses to join them, orders his ship to crash into their capital city with fusion bombs, and jumps into a deep pit to escape the explosion.

=== The Interstellar Alliance ===
Sheridan is saved by Lorien, the oldest living being in the galaxy, who uses his own life force to revive him, though it leaves Sheridan with only twenty years to live. Sheridan returns to the station and leads the allied fleet against both the Shadows and the Vorlons, convincing both races to leave the galaxy at the Battle of Coriana VI.

Following the war, Sheridan leads a fleet to Earth to remove President Clark from power. After disabling loyalist Earthforce ships using telepaths, Sheridan reaches Earth. Clark commits suicide before he can be arrested, but activates Earth's automated orbital defense systems to fire on the planet. Sheridan's fleet joins with surviving Earth ships to destroy the satellites. To ease political tensions with the new Earth government, Sheridan resigns from Earthforce. The League of Non-Aligned Worlds then dissolves to form the Interstellar Alliance, and Sheridan is chosen as its first President.

=== Later years and departure ===
Sheridan runs the Alliance from Babylon 5 for a year before moving to the new headquarters in the Minbari city of Tuzanor. Five years into his presidency, he helps defend Earth against a biological plague released by the Drahk, sending the prototype starship Excalibur to find a cure.

In 2279, Sheridan chooses not to run for re-election, and Delenn becomes the second President while Sheridan takes over leadership of the Rangers. In 2281, knowing his twenty years of life are up, Sheridan meets with his old friends for a final dinner. He visits Babylon 5 one last time before it is decommissioned, then travels alone to Coriana VI. There he is met by Lorien and goes "beyond the rim" of the galaxy. His empty ship is found later, but his body is never recovered.

== Reception and literary analysis ==
John Sheridan's role as a character has been featured in academic discussions regarding science fiction archetypes, as well as analysis of television hero structures.
