= Susan Ivanova =

Fictional character from the television series Babylon 5

- Babylon 5 character
- First appearance: Babylon 5: In the Beginning (chronological) "Midnight on the Firing Line" (airdate)
- Last appearance: "Babylon 5: the Road Home"
- Portrayed by: Claudia Christian
- Voiced by: Claudia Christian

In-universe information
- Species: Human
- Home planet: Earth
- Affiliated with: Babylon 5, Earth Alliance

Susan Ivanova (Russian: Сью́зен Ива́нова) is a lead fictional character in the science fiction television series Babylon 5, played by Claudia Christian.

== Character overview ==
Susan Ivanova holds the rank of lieutenant commander during the first season and is promoted to the rank of commander in the second season. From the first through the fourth seasons of the series, Commander Ivanova was the first officer (XO) of the Babylon 5 space station. After the fourth season of the series, she was promoted to captain and given command of a new class of Earth Alliance warship, the "Warlock-Class". She accepted the promotion because of the tragic events that happened on Babylon 5 at the very end of the Earth Alliance Civil War, in which she played a major role, including the death of Marcus Cole, who sacrificed his own life for hers. During the fifth and final season, she appears only once, in the series' final episode, holding the rank of general – a position for which she showed little enthusiasm. She ultimately ends up as the new leader of the Anla'shok at the insistence of Delenn.

== Character description ==
=== Overview ===
Like many of the show's characters, Susan Ivanova seemed locked in a tragic cycle. The particular millstone around Ivanova's neck was love – not only romantic, but familial as well. Deep down, she believes that "all love is unrequited", perhaps believing that she is undeserving of true happiness. However, in spite of her troubled relationships with her mother, father, brother, and others, she is also fiercely loyal and caring about those to whom she is close. Given her troubled background, she also possesses a surprisingly good sense of humor, which often comes out at odd moments. She has a hot temper and this often leads other crew members to give her a wide berth whenever she is angry. She also possesses a strong sense of integrity and honesty. As a military leader she is brave to the point of recklessness, has the ability to think and act quickly in a crisis, and she can be creative and original in coming up with ways to resolve any situation she finds herself in.

While most of the major Earthforce characters have flown combat missions against raider fighters, Susan Ivanova is "the one most consistently on the front lines of battle. She chases raiders and single-handedly destroys a small fleet", although other commentators note that she fires without a warning in Believers prompting author Andy Lane to ask, "Is this standard Earthforce procedure -- shoot first and ask questions afterwards?"

=== Early life and career ===
Susan Ivanova was born in St. Petersburg, Russian Consortium, in 2230. Her mother, Sophie, is established to have committed suicide when Susan was a child, which Ivanova blames on the Psi Corps. Sophie was a telepath who refused to join the Psi Corps and, as a result, was forced to take telepathy-inhibiting drugs regularly. The powerful depressant effect of these drugs gradually drained her energy and eventually led her to take her own life. Susan Ivanova eventually reveals that she is a latent telepath herself and lives in fear of discovery by the Psi Corps. She harbors a lasting grudge against the Psi Corps throughout the show, and blames them for the death of her mother. Her beloved brother, Ganya, died during the Earth-Minbari War, a piece of backstory set 10 years before the show. He was a fighter pilot aboard the Earth Alliance warship Lexington and was killed in the battle with the Black Star, the Minbari's flagship. Due to her telepathic abilities, she was able to sense her brother's death despite the vast distance between them. She also did not have a good relationship with her father, Andrei, who became irritable and emotionally distant after her mother's death. In a first-season episode her father dies on Earth. She reconciles with him and forgives him before his death.

Over the course of the series Ivanova has two major notable interests. The first, with telepath Talia Winters, is non-sexual and largely implied, though after Talia is revealed as an unwilling sleeper agent and her subsequent departure from Babylon 5, Ivanova admits to possibly loving her. In the first season her relationship with Winters gets off to a rocky start, and her inherent distrust of anyone in Psi Corps leads Ivanova to behave rudely towards Talia. However, they eventually become friends. Ivanova is clearly hurt by the revelation that Talia is actually a "sleeper" Psi Corps agent who had been sent to spy on the command staff of Babylon 5. The second relationship, with Marcus Cole, also starts off badly, as Ivanova regards Marcus as reckless and annoying. However, they eventually become uneasy friends, and when he sacrifices his life to save hers at the end of the fourth season, Ivanova is devastated. She tells Dr. Franklin, B5's medical chief and a close friend, that "all love is unrequited", and wishes that she had returned his love and affection instead of being so sarcastic with him. The death of Marcus leads her to leave Babylon 5 and become captain of the newly commissioned Warlock class destroyer EAS Titans.

Babylon 5 creator Joe Straczynski often spoke of Ivanova's supposedly "Russian" temperament and character. His comments, as well as Ivanova's own quips, hint that her world view may have been shaped by the history of the Russian people. In the future Earth shown on Babylon 5, the Russian people have united in a consortium and are clearly an important power on Earth. Yet, if Ivanova is any example, they remember vividly more difficult times under czars and communism. Although she is not openly religious, Ivanova is established as ethnically Jewish when she sits Shiva after her father's death in season one, and is seen also lighting a menorah. An old friend of her family, a man she refers to as "uncle" who is a rabbi, visits her after her father's death and she comes to accept her faith, if only in private. She does appear to have a belief in God, and she occasionally "talks" to God (in a rather joking manner) under her breath in a few episodes of the series. However, she keeps other aspects of her religious beliefs largely to herself, such as how strictly she follows the Jewish dietary laws, since in the episode "Messages from Earth", Marcus procures a freshly prepared plate of bacon and eggs for her as a surprise to which she does not overtly object; bacon being generally avoided by observant Jews as it comes from pigs, which are specifically listed in the Torah as an unclean animal, and thus not kosher.

Ivanova is promoted several times during the series. She starts as a lieutenant commander, and is promoted to full commander in the second season. At the end of the fourth season, she is made captain. In "Sleeping in Light" (the series finale, set 18 years after the events of the fifth season), it is revealed that she is a general. She retires from Earth Force in this episode and becomes "Ranger One", the head of the Rangers.

=== Relationships ===
Throughout her character arc in Babylon 5, Ivanova is involved in a series of relationships, during season one, an old flame, Malcolm Biggs comes to Babylon 5 eight years after their relationship ends to start a 'business' and rekindle his relationship with Ivanova, before she realizes he is an agent of the xenophobic Homeguard in the episode "The War Prayer".

All of Ivanova's relationships end badly, the most emphasized being her relationship with Marcus Cole, a Ranger assigned to Babylon 5 in 2260. While he falls in love with her early on, she does not begin a romantic relationship with him, possibly because of pain from her previous failed relationships.

Their story comes to a tragic ending in the year 2261, when she is gravely injured in an epic battle to liberate Earth from the dictatorship of President Morgan Clark, aboard the White Star, the Minbari doctors determine that her injuries are too severe for her survival. She is sent to Babylon 5 to be made comfortable as the fleet is going into battle, Marcus searches for a way to save her, until he finds Dr. Stephen Franklin's notes on The Alien Healing/Execution Device, a device that takes life energy from one individual and gives it to another.

Armed with the knowledge that it is stored for safekeeping on Babylon 5, he returns and uses it to save Ivanova's life, at the cost of his own. Only then does Ivanova realize the depth of Marcus' love for her. Mourning the loss, she requests that his body be preserved in cryogenic suspension, in the hopes that he could someday be revived.

=== Talia Winters ===
While not depicted explicitly in the show, it is strongly hinted that there was a lesbian relationship between Talia Winters and Ivanova.

A badly edited scene in 2.19 Divided Loyalties led many to believe that a kiss between the two had been edited out. In response to this, J. Michael Straczynski stated, "No, nothing was cut. We had a matching problem at one point in the edit, where Andrea reached with her left hand in one angle, and did not reach out with the other, and we had to come around for the shot on Ivanova, so it looked a tick off. But nothing was cut."

However, in the same discussion, Straczynski also mentions that, "I didn't show a kiss because, in my experience, it's easier on all around if one steps into the shallow end of the pool first, and walks into the deep end rather than diving in and splashing everybody in the process" and "Susan and Talia had been dancing around one another for months; that night, though, would've been the first time they got physically intimate."

Also, in the same episode, Talia sleeps over at Ivanova's apartment, and while the two are not seen in bed together, during the night Talia makes a 'reaching' motion, as if expecting another person to be sharing the bed, and finding that person gone. Talia also mentions that, when she woke up, Ivanova was gone. Straczynski confirmed this in the script books.

Ivanova referred to Talia during a Minbari rebirth ceremony in the third season of Babylon 5. She told Delenn, the person who organised the ceremony "I think I loved Talia."

=== Departure from Babylon 5 ===
According to Babylon 5 creator J. Michael Straczynski, Claudia Christian declined to be in the fifth season – according to her they weren't interested in having her. No agreement was reached and she was not in season five. She was still able to appear in the final episode, as that episode was originally filmed as the finale of the fourth season and was moved forward. Ivanova did not appear in the episode that was created to serve as a new finale for season four.

This departure necessitated substantial changes to the fifth season of Babylon 5. A planned episode title, "The Very Long Night of Susan Ivanova," was reused as "The Very Long Night of Londo Mollari," though the episodes did not share a plot. Furthermore, a planned romantic relationship between Ivanova and the telepath Byron that would have continued her pattern of tragic relationships was changed to be a romance between Lyta Alexander and Byron, which in turn precipitated the events of the Telepath War. A new character, Elizabeth Lochley, was created to take Ivanova's narrative role as commander of the station.

In the Season 5 episode A View from the Gallery, two maintenance workers discuss Ivanova's sudden departure. They speculate on the reasons she left, mentioning contract and pay disputes and Marcus and his sacrifice before finally concluding that they will not ever know the true story.

== After the series ==
Neither the Babylon 5 movies released after the end of the series nor the spin-off series "Crusade" refer to Ivanova. However, Straczynski wrote a short story set far in the future of the series called Space, Time & the Incurable Romantic which was published in Amazing Stories #602. This story features Marcus Cole being revived after a long time in stasis. The world that created the device Cole used to heal Ivanova (and kill himself in the process) has been discovered, and enough additional information has been found to revive him. While Ivanova herself does not appear, Cole uses some of her hair that was on his uniform and an imprint of her thought patterns and memories. He uses this to create a clone that believes she is Ivanova. He deliberately traps himself and the clone on a remote planet so that he can live out his days with her. The story has been confirmed as canon by Straczynski, who has gone on record to say that Ivanova never finds out about Marcus's cloning of her and his deception, which gave Marcus his own happy ending without Ivanova having to grapple with the ethical issues involved.

== Reception and literary analysis ==
The character of Susan Ivanova has been subject to several literary analysis that focus on her feminine identity, or her military career and LGBT-related coming out or her Jewish background.

== See also ==
- Woman warrior
- List of women warriors in folklore
