= Mike Vejar =

American television director

- Born: Michael Laurence Vejar; June 25, 1943 (age 83); Los Angeles, California, U.S.
- Occupation: television director
- Years active: 1969–2005

Michael Laurence Vejar (born June 25, 1943, in Los Angeles, California) is an American television director, with directing credits on four Star Trek series, as well as directing other notable series, such as Zorro, Babylon 5, MacGyver, The Dead Zone, The X-Files and Jeremiah. He directed the episode "Ultra Woman" in Lois and Clark: The New Adventures of Superman.

== Notes ==
In Babylon 5 episode "The Geometry of Shadows" he is credited as director, 'Mike Laurence Vejar'.
