= David J. Eagle =

American television director (born 1954)

- Born: January 31, 1954 (age 71); Staten Island, New York, United States
- Occupations: Television director; producer; screenwriter
- Known for: Babylon 5

David J. Eagle is a television director, producer, and screenwriter, best known for his direction of 13 episodes of the science fiction series Babylon 5, including "Severed Dreams", which won the Hugo Award for Best Dramatic Presentation, and the CBS Schoolbreak Special "Kids Killing Kids", for which he received the Outstanding Children's Program Emmy Award as writer, director, and producer.
