= Babylon 5: In the Beginning =

1998 American made-for-television film

- TNT promotional poster for Babylon 5: In The Beginning
- Genre: Space opera; Drama
- Created by: J. Michael Straczynski
- Written by: J. Michael Straczynski
- Directed by: Michael Vejar
- Starring: Bruce Boxleitner; Mira Furlan; Richard Biggs; Andreas Katsulas; Peter Jurasik; Reiner Schöne; Michael O'Hare
- Theme music composer: Christopher Franke
- Country of origin: United States
- Original language: English

Production
- Executive producers: Douglas Netter; J. Michael Straczynski
- Producer: John Copeland
- Cinematography: John C. Flinn III
- Editor: Skip Robinson
- Running time: 94 minutes
- Production companies: Babylonian Productions; Warner Bros. Television

Original release
- Network: TNT
- Release: January 4, 1998

Babylon 5: In the Beginning is a 1998 American made-for-television film set in the Babylon 5 fictional universe. It was written by J. Michael Straczynski and directed by Michael Vejar. The film originally aired on January 4, 1998, on the TNT cable network, a couple of weeks before the fifth season of the series began.

The film tells the story of the war between humans and an alien race known as the Minbari, which forms an important part of the backstory of Babylon 5. The war begins as the result of a misunderstanding, and nearly leads to the extermination of the human race, but is halted by the Minbari leadership at the last moment for reasons that remain secret for over a decade. This near-destruction of the human race leads to the Earth Alliance commissioning the Babylon space stations as a means of preventing further wars.

== Plot ==
In 2278, the planet Centauri Prime is in flames. (Note: As depicted in the season 3 episode, "War Without End, Part 2".) Londo Mollari, the emperor of the Centauri Republic, tells two children, Luc and Lyssa, the story of the Earth-Minbari War, which took place 35 years ago while he was a diplomatic liaison to Earth.

In 2243, the human race, emboldened by recent victories, is rapidly expanding into space. Word reaches them of the mysterious Minbari. Though they are warned by Londo to leave this race alone, they send an expedition to study the Minbari, led by the starship Prometheus. The Minbari leadership—the Grey Council, led by Dukhat—are voyaging to investigate concerns that an ancient enemy, the Shadows, may be returning. The Prometheus expedition encounters the Grey Council's convoy by chance. As the Minbari ships approach the Earth ships, they open their gun ports—a sign of respect in their culture. The captain of Prometheus, interpreting this as a signal of intent to attack, opens fire. The Minbari ships are severely damaged and Dukhat is killed. In retaliation, the Grey Council declares a holy war against humanity, with Dukhat's protégée Delenn casting the deciding vote.

The war continues for several months and human forces are overwhelmed by superior Minbari technology. Lieutenant Commander John Sheridan, first officer of the Lexington, is part of a battlegroup engaging the Minbari. After Sheridan's commanding officer is killed, Sheridan assumes command of the damaged ship and lays a trap for the enemy, seeding the local asteroids with nuclear mines. The Minbari flagship Black Star closes in to finish off the Lexington but is destroyed by the mines—Earth's only real victory during the war.

The Minbari faction that feels the war has caused enough senseless bloodshed—led by Delenn, who has learned that Dukhat believed an alliance with humans would be necessary to defeat the Shadows—uses this as an opportunity to engage in peace talks with Earth. The Centauri discover that the humans are having a secret meeting that is being brokered by the Narn, rivals of the Centauri. Not understanding the purpose of the meeting, the Centauri bomb the peace conference, with neither the humans nor Minbari suspecting their intervention. All hope for peace is lost, and humanity's losses at the hands of the Minbari continue for two more years.

In a last, desperate effort, the President of Earth orders all available ships to form a "line" around the planet in an attempt to delay the Minbari to give some humans time to flee the planet. During the battle, a human pilot, Jeffrey Sinclair, is captured for interrogation. The Grey Council is startled to discover that he possesses the soul of the revered Minbari religious leader Valen. Delenn infers that the reincarnation of Valen as a human is a signal that the humans must not be destroyed, and so the Minbari surrender to the defenseless Earth forces. Because of the damage this revelation could do to their society, they keep the reason for the surrender a secret. In the wake of the war, Earth plans to create a space station that will serve as a venue for peaceful collaboration to prevent future wars; these plans will ultimately result in the creation of Babylon 5.

After the children leave him, Londo views Delenn and Sheridan being held captive in the Centauri palace. Toasting them as his friends, he begins drinking heavily and orders the prisoners to be brought to him in one hour.
