= Severed Dreams =

- Babylon 5 episode
- Episode no.: Season 3 Episode 10
- Directed by: David J. Eagle
- Written by: J. Michael Straczynski
- Production code: 310
- Original air date: April 1, 1996

Guest appearances
- Kim Miyori (Capt. Sandra Hiroshi); Rance Howard (David Sheridan); Phil Morris (Bill Trainor); Bruce McGill (Major Ed Ryan)

Episode chronology
| ← Previous "Point of No Return" | Next → "Ceremonies of Light and Dark" |

"Severed Dreams" is an episode from the third season of the science fiction television series Babylon 5. It won the 1997 Hugo Award for Best Dramatic Presentation.

== Title ==
Writer J. Michael Straczynski states that the title refers to the separation of the Babylon 5 space station, referred to as "a dream given form" in the season 1 opening title narratives, from the Earth Alliance. He writes, "If Babylon 5 was a dream given form, and the Earth Alliance had the potential to be something more than it has become, and the two part ways, then you have severed dreams."

== Plot ==
After President Clark declares martial law, General Hague's fleet of ships is attacked by Earth Alliance forces. Only Hague's flagship, Alexander, survives, and travels to Babylon 5 for repairs. Delenn brings Dr. Franklin to attend to a Minbari Ranger, injured while returning to the station with key information. The Minbari reports that the Shadows have engaged the Non-Aligned Worlds in civil and interplanetary wars, creating chaos. Delenn decides to see the Grey Council, angered by their ambivalent response to the situation.

When Alexander arrives, Sheridan learns that General Hague was killed in an attack. His second-in-command, Major Ryan, has attempted to continue Hague's resistance. President Clark orders the bombing of the Mars colony, which is resisting the martial law order. Hundreds of civilians are killed. The news network ISN, which has avoided broadcasting material critical of Clark, reports that the Proxima III and Orion VII colonies have seceded from the Earth Alliance. The television station is raided by Earth Alliance forces, terminating their broadcast. Another ship arrives, the Churchill, under Captain Sandra Hiroshi. She warns that the Earth Alliance is aware of Alexander's presence and ships are en route to seize control of the station. Sheridan enlists G'Kar's Narn to augment his security forces under Garibaldi. Sheridan then announces Babylon 5's secession from the Earth Alliance.

Delenn reaches the Grey Council. When they refuse to speak with her, she barges into their chamber and addresses them, warning that all of their prophecies have come to pass. She declares the Council broken and departs, supported by the worker and religious caste council members.

The Alliance ships Agrippa and Roanoke arrive, demanding the station's surrender. A firefight breaks out. Garibaldi, his security forces, and the Narn stop a boarding party, incurring many Narn losses. The Churchill is critically damaged and Hiroshi uses the last of its power to ram the Roanoke, destroying both vessels. The combined forces of the station and Alexander destroy Agrippa. As they assess the damage, more Earth Alliance ships arrive demanding Babylon 5's surrender. Suddenly additional jump points open and Minbari warships arrive. Delenn warns the Earth Alliance ships that Babylon 5 is under Minbari protection. The Earth Alliance ships withdraw.

As the station and Alexander complete repairs, Ryan states he will depart, hoping to split the Alliance's attention. Ivanova leads Sheridan to the Zocalo, where the residents applaud Sheridan's decision to have Babylon 5 take a stand against Clark.

== Production ==
Writer J. Michael Straczynski regards this episode as the final part in a 3-episode arc, following Messages from Earth and Point of No Return. Straczynski believes this episode blew the record for the number of individual scenes, having close to 140 scenes, as compared to "the average TV script [which] has about 60–75 scenes or shots...". Within a short section of four pages of the script there were literally 100 CGI and live action shots.

Actor Robert Foxworth had been booked well in advance to appear in the episode as the rebel Earthforce leader, General Hague. However, Foxworth became double-booked, and filmed a similar character on Star Trek: Deep Space Nine instead. As a result, Straczynski killed off the character, with his lines being given to another character, Major Ryan.

Actor Jerry Doyle, playing Security Chief Michael Garibaldi, broke his right arm and right wrist during filming of combat scenes, his arm being seen bent in unusual directions as he releases his helmet.

The bridge set for the Earthforce destroyers was actually a redress of the set for the circular command observation dome on the Babylon 5 station. Platforms were placed over the pit areas to enable the actors to walk over these sections, and additional displays were added to the set. Clear displays with crewmembers on the far side of the screen were added to make the set appear larger and more intricate. These were merely plexiglass panels with tape applied.

The flame effects in the battle scenes were filmed in the parking lot, with a camera pointing upwards, filming through a plexiglass screen. One of the explosions was so big that it melted the plexiglass and the camera lens.

The lighting for the scene where Commander Ivanova's fighter ship is tumbling was achieved by attaching a light to a gimbal, moving the light to match the pre-determined rotation of the fighter.

== Awards ==
Severed Dreams was awarded the 1997 Hugo Award for Best Dramatic Presentation, beating a number of major science fiction releases, including Star Trek: First Contact, Independence Day and Mars Attacks!.
