= Babylon 5 (franchise) =

American space opera franchise

- Franchise logo
- Created by: J. Michael Straczynski
- Original work: Babylon 5
- Owner: Skydance
- Years: 1993–present

Print publications
- Novels: List of novels
- Comics: List of comics

Films and television
- Films: Television films: Babylon 5: The Gathering; In the Beginning; Thirdspace; The River of Souls; A Call to Arms; The Legend of the Rangers: To Live and Die in Starlight; Direct-to-video: Babylon 5: the Road Home
- Television series: Babylon 5; Crusade (TV series); Babylon 5: The Lost Tales; Untitled Babylon 5 reboot

Babylon 5 is an American space opera media franchise created by writer and producer J. Michael Straczynski, under the Babylonian Productions label in association with Straczynski’s Synthetic Worlds Ltd. and Warner Bros. Domestic Television. After the successful airing of a pilot movie, Warner Bros. commissioned the series as part of the second year schedule of programs provided by its Prime Time Entertainment Network (PTEN). It premiered in the United States on January 26, 1994 and ran for the intended five seasons. Describing it as having "always been conceived as, fundamentally, a five year story, a novel for television", Straczynski wrote 92 of the 110 episodes and served as executive producer, along with Douglas Netter.

Set between the years 2257 and 2262, it depicts a future where Earth has sovereign states and a unifying Earthgov. Colonies within the Solar System, and beyond, make up the Earth Alliance and contact has been made with numerous spacefaring races. The ensemble cast portray alien ambassadorial staff and humans assigned to the five mile long Babylon 5 space station, a center for trade and diplomacy. Described as "one of the most complex programs on television" the various story arcs drew upon the prophesies, religious zealotry, racial tensions, social pressures and political rivalries which existed within each of their cultures to create a contextual frame for the motivations and consequences of the protagonists' actions. With a strong emphasis on character development set against a backdrop of conflicting ideologies on multiple levels, Straczynski wanted "to take an adult approach to SF, and attempt to do for television SF what Hill Street Blues did for cop shows."

The original show spawned a multimedia franchise of spin-offs consisting of a miniseries, six television movies, a direct-to-video animated film, twenty-two novels, two tabletop games (an RPG and a wargame), and various other media such as technical books, comics, and trading cards.

== Films ==
Film	U.S. release date	Director(s)	Screenwriter(s)	Producer(s)	Release format	Distributor
Babylon 5: The Gathering	February 22, 1993	Richard Compton	J. Michael Straczynski	Douglas Netter; J. Michael Straczynski	Direct-to-TV	PTEN
Babylon 5: In the Beginning	January 4, 1998	Mike Vejar	J. Michael Straczynski	Douglas Netter; J. Michael Straczynski	Direct-to-TV	TNT
Babylon 5: Thirdspace	July 19, 1998	Jesús Salvador Treviño	J. Michael Straczynski	Douglas Netter; J. Michael Straczynski	Direct-to-TV	TNT
Babylon 5: The River of Souls	November 8, 1998	Janet Greek	J. Michael Straczynski	Douglas Netter; J. Michael Straczynski	Direct-to-TV	TNT
Babylon 5: A Call to Arms	January 3, 1999	Mike Vejar	J. Michael Straczynski	Douglas Netter; J. Michael Straczynski	Direct-to-TV	TNT
Babylon 5: The Legend of the Rangers	January 19, 2002	Mike Vejar	J. Michael Straczynski	Douglas Netter; J. Michael Straczynski	Direct-to-TV	TNT
Babylon 5: The Road Home	August 15, 2023	Matt Peters	J. Michael Straczynski	J. Michael Straczynski; Sam Register	Direct-to-video	Warner Bros. Home Entertainment

=== Television movies ===
==== Babylon 5: The Gathering (1993) ====
The Gathering is the pilot, depicting the arrival of several major characters at the Babylon 5 station in the year 2257.

==== Babylon 5: In the Beginning (1998) ====
In the Beginning depicts the events of the Earth-Minbari War, as revealed in the first few seasons, in chronological order, and in greater detail than the main series.

==== Babylon 5: Thirdspace (1998) ====
Thirdspace is mostly a stand-alone story. The horror-based story, which ties into the Shadow/Vorlon plotline, centers on the return of an ancient and overwhelming alien force which had once attempted to destroy life in the Milky Way.

==== Babylon 5: The River of Souls (1998) ====
The River of Souls is mostly a stand-alone story.

==== Babylon 5: A Call to Arms (1999) ====
A Call to Arms sets up the initial premise of the Crusade series, depicting the alien Drakh species releasing a nanovirus plague on Earth, which will destroy all life on the planet within five years, if it is not stopped. To that end, the Earth Alliance destroyer Excalibur is sent to look for a cure beyond Earth itself.

==== Babylon 5: The Legend of the Rangers (2002) ====
To Live and Die in Starlight, also known as Babylon 5: The Legend of the Rangers, was produced by the Sci-Fi Channel. It was the proposed pilot episode of a new series of the same name. Rescheduled after the September 11 attacks, the film aired on January 19, 2002. However, it was scheduled against an NFL AFC Divisional Championship playoff game. The pilot's poor ratings contributed to the lessening of the network's interest in a series pick-up, as did the poor reception it received from fans and critics alike, particularly for its depiction of a virtual-reality weapon, but the final nail in its coffin was the dispute between Warner Bros. and Vivendi Universal (owners of the Sci-Fi Channel) over revenue-sharing for the potential weekly series.

In the Beginning, Thirdspace The River of Souls, A Call to Arms, The Legend of the Rangers, and The Lost Tales are sometimes marketed as Babylon 5: The Movies.

=== Direct-to-video ===
==== Babylon 5: The Road Home (2023) ====
In May 2023, J. Michael Straczynski announced plans on his social media for a direct-to-video animated film, produced by Warner Bros. Animation, and distributed by Warner Bros. Home Entertainment. On May 10, 2023, the film's title was officially announced to be Babylon 5: The Road Home, with Matt Peters directing. It was released on August 14, 2023 .

== Television ==
Series	Seasons	Episodes	Originally released	Network
Babylon 5	5	110 (+ 6 TV films)	February 22, 1993 – November 25, 1998	PTEN (1993–1997) TNT (1998)
Crusade	1	13	June 9 – September 1, 1999	TNT
Babylon 5: The Lost Tales	1	2	July 31, 2007	Never aired on TV, Released on DVD
Untitled Babylon 5 reboot	1	TBA	TBA	The CW

=== Babylon 5 ===
The first installment in the Babylon 5 universe, The series follows the human military staff and alien diplomats stationed on a space station, Babylon 5, built in the aftermath of several major inter-species wars as a neutral ground for galactic diplomacy and trade. Major plotlines included Babylon 5's embroilment in a millennial cyclic conflict between ancient races, inter-race wars and their aftermaths, and intra-race intrigue and upheaval. The human characters, in particular, become pivotal to the resistance against Earth's descent into totalitarianism.

=== Crusade ===
The spin-off series Crusade ran on TNT for 13 episodes, having been set up by the TV film A Call to Arms. The production team received help from NASA's Jet Propulsion Laboratory to ensure that the series depicted space science and futuristic technology accurately, according to current scientific theory. However, creative differences between Straczynski and TNT caused problems; the network wanted more sex and violence, and forced Straczynski to begin the first episode with a fistfight. The sex-and-violence request was later withdrawn, and TNT allocated more money to Crusade, giving the actors better uniforms and new sets mid-season. However, due to further creative differences, TNT eventually decided to cancel the series after 13 episodes had been produced, but before any of them were aired. At the time of the cancellation, only hints of major story arcs had yet come into play, though unproduced scripts were published online by Straczynski.

=== Babylon 5: The Lost Tales ===
A new project set in Babylon 5 universe was announced by Straczynski at San Diego Comic-Con in 2006. Babylon 5: The Lost Tales is a set of mini-stories featuring established characters from the series, released direct-to-DVD. Production of the first anthology of two stories, named collectively Voices in the Dark, commenced in November 2006 with Straczynski writing, producing, and directing. It was released July 31, 2007. In a Usenet post on September 5, 2007, Straczynski stated that Warner Bros. "are most pleased as sales have been several orders of magnitude beyond what they anticipated."

On July 13, 2008, Straczynski revealed that he had no plans to continue The Lost Tales. He said that although the studio was interested in another disc, they wanted to budget the next installment similarly to the first. Citing his disappointment with the first release due to the low budget, Straczynski said he did not want to dilute Babylon 5's legacy with further sub-par stories. He stated that he would only return to the Babylon 5 universe if Warner Bros. wanted to do a large-budgeted cinema release.

=== The CW reboot TV series ===
A reboot of Babylon 5 was announced in September 2021. It was to be produced by Straczynski through Studio JMS, and developed by Warner Bros. Television for The CW. As of May 2022, despite several changes at The CW due to numerous cancellations of other shows resulting from the Warner Bros. Discovery merger, the project was still in active development. However, it was later put on hold amidst the 2023 Writers Guild of America strike. Straczynski later stated that Warner Bros. Discovery had taken back the rights back from The CW and was shopping the project to other outlets.

== Cancelled projects ==
=== Untitled 2010s feature film reboot ===
During San Diego Comic-Con in 2014, Straczynski announced that he would soon be sitting down to write a Babylon 5 feature film, which is envisioned as a reboot of the iconic sci-fi series. JMS said that he plans to get the script locked down by the end of 2015 and the film would then enter production in 2016. However, this film has yet to be produced.

=== The Memory of Shadows ===
In 2004 and early 2005, rumors widely circulated about a planned Babylon 5 film for theatrical release. However, on February 25, 2005, a post from Straczynski announced that the project had fallen through, and was, for all practical purposes, dead. The proposed film, titled The Memory of Shadows (TMoS), was written by Straczynski. Filming was to have begun in April 2005 in the UK, with Steven Beck as the director.

During the "Spotlight on J. Michael Straczynski" panel at the 2010 New York Comic Con, Straczynski revealed, "I said to Warner Bros. a while back, 'When you’re ready to do something real with Babylon 5, either a big-budget film or a TV show, if you want to do one of those two things, call me; otherwise, don't bother me.' About a month ago the phone rang. I don't know where this is gonna go yet, but when they call you, there's something going on. I can't tell you what it is yet, and it may not go anywhere, but there is movement in the tall grass."

== Timeline ==
The following table lists all canonical works in order of their main timeline. Titles that appear more than once contain significant time jumps within the story.

Year	Work					
2115	The Birth of the Psi Corps					
2189	The Birth of the Psi Corps					
2195	Bester Ascendant					
2243	In the Beginning*					
2244	In the Beginning*					
2245	In the Beginning*					
2246	In the Beginning*					
2247	In the Beginning*					
2248	In the Beginning*					
2256		The Shadow Within				
2257	The Gathering	The Shadow Within				
2258	Season 1	Bester Ascendant	Casting Shadows			
2259	Season 2	Summoning Light	Casting Shadows	To Dream in the City of Sorrows	Comics	
2260	Season 3	Space, Time and the Incurable Romantic	Invoking Darkness	To Dream in the City of Sorrows		
2261	Season 4	Thirdspace	Invoking Darkness	In Valen's Name		
2262	Season 5	The Long Night of Centauri Prime	The Shadow of His Thoughts	Genius Loci	Hidden Agendas	The Road Home
2263	The River of Souls	The Long Night of Centauri Prime				
2264		The Long Night of Centauri Prime				
2265	The Legend of the Rangers	The Long Night of Centauri Prime	The Nautilus Coil			
2266	A Call to Arms	The Long Night of Centauri Prime	Armies of Light and Dark			
2267	Crusade		Armies of Light and Dark			
2268			Armies of Light and Dark			
2269	True Seeker		Armies of Light and Dark			
2270			Armies of Light and Dark			
2271	The Lost Tales: Voices in the Dark	The Fate of Bester	Armies of Light and Dark	The Lost Tales mini-comic		
2272		The Fate of Bester	Armies of Light and Dark			
2273		The Fate of Bester	Armies of Light and Dark			
2274		The Fate of Bester	Out of the Darkness			
2275		The Fate of Bester	Out of the Darkness			
2276		The Fate of Bester	Out of the Darkness			
2277		The Fate of Bester	Out of the Darkness			
2278	In the Beginning*	The Fate of Bester	Out of the Darkness			
2279		The Fate of Bester	Out of the Darkness			
2280	Sleeping in Light (S5E22)	The Fate of Bester				
2281	Sleeping in Light (S5E22)	The Fate of Bester				
2362	The Deconstruction of Falling Stars (S4E22)					
2593	Space, Time, and the Incurable Romantic					
2762	The Deconstruction of Falling Stars (S4E22)					
3262	The Deconstruction of Falling Stars (S4E22)					
+ 1 Mio.	The Deconstruction of Falling Stars (S4E22)					

- The main story of In the Beginning is set 15 years before the main Babylon 5 television series, but the film does feature a few scenes set much later in the year 2278.

TV series
Films
Novels
Comic books
Short stories

== Novels ==
Unique to the Babylon 5 universe among virtually all other shared universes is the sanctioned canonicity of many of its offshoot novels and comic book stories; nearly all of the Babylon 5 novels and novelizations to date having been based on outlines written directly by J. Michael Straczynski. The later Del Rey books are considered to be more canonical than some of the earlier Dell ones, although – per Straczynski's own remarks – canonical elements exist in every single book published to date; Straczynski's deeper involvement in the novel-publishing program from 1996 onward having ensured a greater level of canonicity within such works.

The seventh Dell novel has been described as 90% canonical, and the ninth novel is considered fully canonical by J. Michael Straczynski, with canon elements interspersed throughout the other books.

1. Babylon 5: Voices by John Vornholt (1995, ISBN 0-440-22057-2)
2. Babylon 5: Accusations by Lois Tilton (1995, ISBN 0-440-22058-0)
3. Babylon 5: Blood Oath by John Vornholt (1995, ISBN 0-440-22059-9)
4. Babylon 5: Clark's Law by Jim Mortimore (1996, ISBN 0-440-22229-X)
5. Babylon 5: The Touch of Your Shadow, the Whisper of Your Name by Neal Barrett, Jr. (1996, ISBN 0-440-22230-3)
6. Babylon 5: Betrayals by S.M. Stirling (1996, ISBN 0-440-22234-6)
7. Babylon 5: The Shadow Within by Jeanne Cavelos (1997, ISBN 0-440-22348-2; 2001 edition: ISBN 0-345-45218-6)
8. Babylon 5: Personal Agendas by Al Sarrantonio (1997, ISBN 0-440-22351-2)
9. Babylon 5: To Dream in the City of Sorrows by Kathryn M. Drennan (1997, ISBN 0-440-22354-7; 2003 edition: ISBN 0-345-45219-4)

=== The Psi Corps Trilogy ===
All are considered canon: written by Gregory Keyes.

1. Babylon 5: Dark Genesis – The Birth of the Psi Corps (1998, ISBN 0-345-42715-7)
2. Babylon 5: Deadly Relations – Bester Ascendant (1999, ISBN 0-345-42716-5)
3. Babylon 5: Final Reckoning – The Fate of Bester (1999, ISBN 0-345-42717-3)

Hardcover omnibus, The Psi Corps Trilogy. Published January 1, 1999 by the Science Fiction Book Club. (ISBN 9780739406564)

=== The Centauri Trilogy ===
All are considered canon: written by Peter David.

1. Babylon 5: Legions of Fire – The Long Night of Centauri Prime (1999, ISBN 0-345-42718-1)
2. Babylon 5: Legions of Fire – Armies of Light and Dark (2000, ISBN 0-345-42719-X)
3. Babylon 5: Legions of Fire – Out of the Darkness (2000, ISBN 0-345-42720-3)

All three books are collected in Legions of Fire. Published 2000 by the Science Fiction Book Club. Out of the Darkness is reportedly based in large part on J. Michael Straczynski's script notes. (ISBN 9780739414859)

=== The Technomage Trilogy ===
All are considered canon: written by Jeanne Cavelos.

1. Babylon 5: The Passing of the Techno-Mages – Casting Shadows (2001, ISBN 0-345-42721-1)
2. Babylon 5: The Passing of the Techno-Mages – Summoning Light (2001, ISBN 0-345-42722-X)
3. Babylon 5: The Passing of the Techno-Mages – Invoking Darkness (2001, ISBN 0-345-43833-7)

In addition, the standalone novel Babylon 5: The Shadow Within serves as a prologue to the trilogy.

Hardcover omnibus The Passing of the Techno-Mages collects the trilogy. Published 2002 by the Science Fiction Book Club. (ISBN 0-7394-2395-9)

=== Novelizations ===
- Babylon 5: In the Beginning, by Peter David (1998, ISBN 0-345-42452-2)
- Babylon 5: Thirdspace, by Peter David (1998, ISBN 0-345-42454-9)
- Babylon 5: A Call to Arms, by Robert Sheckley (1999, ISBN 0-345-43155-3)

== Short stories ==
Straczynski penned a number of short stories expanding on several key story-points from the television series, along with a number of other established authors.

- "The Shadow of His Thoughts," by J. Michael Straczynski (Summer, 1999, Amazing Stories Magazine)
- "Genius Loci," by J. Michael Straczynski (Winter, 2000, Amazing Stories Magazine)
- "Space, Time, and the Incurable Romantic" by J. Michael Straczynski (Summer, 2000, Amazing Stories Magazine); download
- "Hidden Agendas," by J. Michael Straczynski (May 2000, The Official Babylon 5 Magazine)
- "True Seeker," by Fiona Avery (July 2000, The Official Babylon 5 Magazine)
- "The Nautilus Coil," by J. Gregory Keyes (August 2000, The Official Babylon 5 Magazine)

== Comic books ==
The comic books published by DC are also fully endorsed, with Straczynski having directly written or contributed to all of the issues written by other authors in one form or another, though issues 9 and 10 contradict other strictly-canonical sources in certain respects.

Mongoose Publishing, publisher of the Babylon 5 role-playing game (RPG) material, announced plans to release a line of Babylon 5 novels and graphic novels, beginning in the summer of 2006. J. Michael Straczynski made it clear that he was not involved with this project, and considered the works to be "fan-fiction."

In 2007, Straczynski was writing the manuscript for a Babylon 5 graphic novel, which was to be published by Wildstorm Productions. The premise, characters, and plot have not been officially confirmed, but it has been reported that Straczynski originally planned to write a story that takes place before the Season Three two-parter "War Without End," featuring Sinclair and Sheridan, and involving Mars, Minbar, Babylon 5, and a conspiracy. It has also been reported that he subsequently decided to tie in elements from the spin-offs Crusade and Legend of the Rangers into the book. The graphic novel was to be 100 pages long.

When asked by a fan during the "Spotlight on J. Michael Straczynski" panel at the 2010 New York Comic Con, Straczynski said no new Babylon 5 comics were in the works.

=== Monthly DC Comics series (1994–95) ===
- Altogether, there were 11 issues produced:
  1. "In Darkness Find Me," written by J. Michael Straczynski (December 1994, DC Comics)
  2. "Treason," written by Mark Moretti, story premise by J. Michael Straczynski (January 1995, DC Comics)
  3. "In Harm's Way," written by Mark Moretti, story premise by J. Michael Straczynski (February 1995, DC Comics)
  4. "The Price of Peace," story premise by J. Michael Straczynski (March 1995, DC Comics)
    - "Shadows Past and Present" storyline:
  5. "With Friends Like These...", written by Timothy DeHaas, story premise by J. Michael Straczynski and art by John Ridgway (June 1995, DC Comics)
  6. "Against the Odds," written by Timothy DeHaas, story premise by J. Michael Straczynski and art by John Ridgway (July 1995, DC Comics)
  7. "Survival the Hard Way," written by Timothy DeHaas, story premise by J. Michael Straczynski and art by John Ridgway(August 1995, DC Comics)
  8. "Silent Enemies," written by Tim DeHaas, story premise by J. Michael Straczynski and art by John Ridgway (September 1995, DC Comics)
    - "Laser-Mirror-Starweb" storyline:
  9. "Duet for Human and Narn in C Sharp," written by David Gerrold (October 1995, DC Comics)
  10. "Coda for Human and Narn in B Flat," written by David Gerrold (November 1995, DC Comics)
    - "Brought to You by the Psi Corps":
  11. "The Psi Corps and You!", written by Timothy DeHaas and art by John Ridgway (December 1995, DC Comics)

Comics 1–4 were published in the trade paperback Babylon 5 (October 1995, Titan Books, ISBN 1-85286-646-2).
Comics 5–8 were published in the trade paperback Shadows Past and Present (September 1996, Titan Books, ISBN 1-85286-735-3).
Comics 1–4 and 11 were published in the trade paperback The Price of Peace (November 1998, DC Comics, ISBN 1-56389-467-X).

=== Babylon 5: In Valen's Name ===
1. "In Valen's Name, Part 1," written by J. Michael Straczynski (February 1998, DC Comics)
2. "In Valen's Name, Part 2," written by Peter David, story by J. Michael Straczynski (March 1998, DC Comics)
3. "In Valen's Name, Part 3," written by Peter David, story by J. Michael Straczynski (April 1998, DC Comics)

The comic was originally serialised in six parts in the UK in Babylon 5: The Official Monthly Magazine #3–8 (November 1997 – May 1998). All three comics were published in the trade paperback In Valen's Name (December 1998, Titan Books, ISBN 1-85286-981-X).

=== Babylon 5 mini-comic ===
A special ashcan-sized comic book was included exclusively with Best Buy–sold DVD copies of Babylon 5: The Lost Tales, written by series creator J. Michael Straczynski.

== Cookbook ==
In 1998, the series briefly published a cookbook titled Dining on Babylon 5. Set during season 3 and ostensibly by the owner of the Fresh Air Restaurant, Emerson Briggs-Wallace, it was actually written by Stephen C. Smith. It was a limited run published only in the United Kingdom but made an appearance in one episode. In "A View from the Gallery", a character is shown reading it; since the book was not yet finished, a mock-up was used with a different cover.

== Games ==
In November 1997, Chameleon Eclectic Entertainment published the original The Babylon Project: The Roleplaying Game Based on Babylon 5. In 2003, Mongoose Publishing printed the Babylon 5 Roleplaying Game & Factbook.

The Babylon 5 Component Game system was also released in 1997 by Component Game Systems. It was a complex political and military-based game, using a number of individually purchased expansions or components, which could take up to five hours to play. Component Game Systems came out with a number of component game systems that used the same semi-collectible approach, and was derived from the unpublished Galactic Empires board game, based on the CCG of the same name—Companion Games (Galactic Empires' publisher) became Component Game Systems in the process. The basic idea is that each player need only buy his part of the game, representing in this case a specific political entity from the Babylon 5 universe. Players sit down at the same table and combine their components to have a game. Component Game Systems folded in 1999 after having released only the first two "years" (2258 and 2259) worth of Babylon 5-related components for the game.

The Babylon 5 Wars wargame was first published by Agents of Gaming in 1998. The game was developed in close contact with the creators of the show, and most of the published material is considered canon. Agents of Gaming later published Babylon 5 Fleet Action, which focused on battles of a larger scale. In 2004, Babylon 5: A Call to Arms was released by Mongoose Publishing after Glass took a job with that company. The game is similar in many ways to Babylon 5 Wars, but some consider it to have more-streamlined rules set, and games may take a less time to complete.

Precedence Entertainment produced the Babylon 5 Collectible Card Game between 1997 and 2000. In its original form, the game allowed for 2–4 players, with each one playing one of the ambassadors to the B5 council: Sinclair, Delenn, G'Kar, or Londo. Later expansions increased the maximum number of players that could play at once, and expanded the players' options. Players could represent the League of Non-Aligned Worlds, or could play alternative ambassadors, such as Bester for the Psi Corps or Lord Refa for the Centauri. The game was discontinued after Precedence lost the license from Warner Bros. in 2000.

There are no officially-licensed Babylon 5 video games on the market, though in 1998 a video game based on Babylon 5, named Into the Fire, was being developed by Yosemite Entertainment, an internal division of Sierra Entertainment. Work on this game ended on September 21, 1999, when, as part of a corporate reorganization, Sierra cancelled it and laid off its development staff when the game was only a few months away from release. This game was to have cast the player as the pilot of a Starfury fighter craft, giving the player an opportunity to "move up through the ranks," and eventually take command of capital ships and even fleets. Christopher Franke composed and recorded new music for the game, and live action footage was filmed with the primary actors from the series.

A number of unauthorized Babylon 5 modifications have been created for other computer games such as Homeworld and Homeworld 2, as well as at least one (unlicensed) independent project to develop a standalone game. The only finished work as yet though is the free and standalone game "The Babylon Project" based on the FreeSpace 2 Source Code Project. Another unauthorized modification is being developed for X3:Terran Conflict by a group of fans working over the internet called X3: Babylon 5. The game is expected to feature many canon ship and station designs, work from the licensed materials, as well as numerous new art. The developers, including Amras Arfeniel, are still drafting 3D meshes for the game but hoped to begin game trials by Summer 2016. The team is not yet looking for testers but is recruiting 3D artists. Finally, there is a Babylon 5 mod for Civilization IV: Beyond the Sword.

In 2012, an independent group of fans of the Agents of Gaming game started work on a browser-based game. The intention was to get as close as possible to the tabletop strategic game with the added advantage of playing on a worldwide scale. The game, called Fiery Void, is now in closed Beta testing, and is intended to be used without any commercial goals.

Another unofficial game is Babylon 5: I've Found Her, a freeware space combat simulator developed by Space Dream Factory, which—like Into the Fire—allows players to fly Starfuries.

== See also ==
- List of space science fiction franchises
