= Grogu =

Star Wars character also known as Baby Yoda

Din Grogu
- Star Wars character
- Grogu in The Mandalorian (2019)
- First appearance: "Chapter 1: The Mandalorian"; The Mandalorian; (2019)
- Created by: Jon Favreau
- Voiced by: David Acord (effects)

In-universe information
- Full name: Din Grogu (né Grogu)
- Nicknames: The Asset (by the Empire); The Child; The Foundling; The Kid (by Din Djarin and others)
- Species: Yoda's species
- Gender: Male
- Occupation: Jedi Initiate; Mandalorian foundling and apprentice; Knight of the Ancient Order of Independent Regencies
- Affiliation: Jedi Order; Mandalorians; Children of the Watch; Clan Mudhorn
- Family: Din Djarin / The Mandalorian (adoptive father)
- Masters: Luke Skywalker; Several others
- Age: 53 years (born ca. 41 BBY)

Din Grogu (/ˈɡroʊɡu/) or simply Grogu, colloquially referred to as Baby Yoda, is a character from the Star Wars Disney+ original television series The Mandalorian. He is an infant member of the same species as the Star Wars characters Yoda and Yaddle, with whom he shares a strong ability in the Force. In the series, the protagonist known as "the Mandalorian" is hired to track down and capture Grogu for a remnant of the fallen Galactic Empire, but instead, he becomes his adoptive father and protects him from the Imperials. The character's real name was not revealed until "Chapter 13: The Jedi", which also explained that Grogu was raised at the Jedi Temple on Coruscant during the Clone Wars. Before this, the character's official name, used in subtitles and captions, was "the Child". At the end of "Chapter 24: The Return", he is given the name Din Grogu after being formally adopted by the Mandalorian, whose family name is "Din".

Grogu appears in every episode of the series, except "Chapter 15: The Believer". He was created by The Mandalorian creator and showrunner Jon Favreau based upon his desire to explore the mystery around Yoda and his species. The character was further developed in early conversations between Favreau and executive producer Dave Filoni, and the character's imagery was defined by concept artist Christian Alzmann. Grogu is mostly a work of animatronics and puppetry, although accentuated with computer-generated imagery. The character also appears in the series The Book of Boba Fett and the film The Mandalorian and Grogu.

The puppet was designed by Legacy Effects. Actor Adam Pally has stated that showrunner Jon Favreau told him it cost about $5 million to make. It is controlled by two technicians, one who operates the eyes and mouth and another who controls other facial expressions. The character's voice and sounds were created using a combination of adult and infant vocals, as well as recordings of a bat-eared fox and kinkajou. The dynamic between the Mandalorian and Grogu embodies a theme of parenting and fatherhood prevalent in The Mandalorian, with the character also raising questions about good and evil and nature versus nurture in the series.

Grogu has received a positive reception from fans and reviewers, is widely considered the show's breakout character, and quickly became a popular Internet meme. The Guardian called him "2019's biggest new character", and The Hollywood Reporter has said the character "represents the future of Hollywood". Many writers have described Grogu as a key part in the success of Disney+. Grogu was kept secret and was deliberately withheld from The Mandalorian's pre-release marketing and merchandise plans to avoid leaks and spoiling Grogu's reveal before the show aired.

== Appearances ==
=== Backstory ===
A member of the same species as the Star Wars character Yoda, he is 50 years old during the events of The Mandalorian "Chapter 1: The Mandalorian", but still appears to be an infant because of the pace at which that species matures. The species has never been given a proper name because Star Wars creator George Lucas wanted Yoda to maintain a sense of mystery. Until Chapter 13 (i.e. episode 5 of season 2) of The Mandalorian, Grogu was not identified by a proper name, being referred to by sympathetic characters as "the child", "the kid", or "the baby", and by the antagonists as "the asset", "the bounty", "the target", or "the donor".

=== Season 1 ===
Grogu first appears in the series debut, "Chapter 1: The Mandalorian", when the Mandalorian accepts a valuable commission from a mysterious man known only as "The Client" (Werner Herzog), who works for a remnant of the now-fallen Galactic Empire. The assignment is to track down and capture an unidentified fifty-year-old target. The Mandalorian and a fellow bounty hunter droid, IG-11 (Taika Waititi), infiltrate a remote and heavily defended encampment on the planet Arvala-7 and find Grogu. When IG-11 attempts to kill Grogu, the Mandalorian protects him and instead shoots and destroys IG-11. In "Chapter 2: The Child", Grogu is present when the Mandalorian is attacked by a giant rhinoceros-like creature called a mudhorn. As the beast rushes toward the Mandalorian for the kill, Grogu uses the Force to levitate the mudhorn, allowing a surprised Mandalorian to kill it. The Mandalorian delivers Grogu to the Client on the planet Nevarro and collects his bounty in "Chapter 3: The Sin", after which the Client orders his colleague, Dr. Pershing (Omid Abtahi), to "extract the necessary material" from Grogu. The Mandalorian later has second thoughts and returns to the Imperial compound to rescue Grogu, killing multiple stormtroopers. This violates the code of the Bounty Hunters' Guild, and a group of bounty hunters led by guild leader Greef Karga (Carl Weathers) ambush the Mandalorian and attempt to take Grogu back from him. The Mandalorian and Grogu are saved when fellow warriors from the Mandalorian's tribe come out of hiding to defend them, allowing them to escape Nevarro.

In "Chapter 4: Sanctuary", the Mandalorian seeks refuge in the sparsely populated planet Sorgan. He plans to leave Grogu in a village there under the care of a widow named Omera (Julia Jones), but after another bounty hunter tracks them down, he realizes the planet is not safe. The Mandalorian and Grogu visit the planet Tatooine in "Chapter 5: The Gunslinger", during which the Mandalorian leaves Grogu in the care of a mechanic named Peli Motto (Amy Sedaris). Grogu and Peli are briefly abducted by a bounty hunter named Toro Calican (Jake Cannavale), whom the Mandalorian kills. In "Chapter 6: The Prisoner", the Mandalorian participates in a rescue job as part of a team of mercenaries organized by Ranzar Malk (Mark Boone Junior). The Mandalorian keeps Grogu hidden on his ship during the mission, but the other mercenaries eventually find him. One of them, a droid named Q9-0 (Richard Ayoade), learns of the bounty on Grogu and tries to kill him, but is himself destroyed by the Mandalorian. At the start of the first season's penultimate episode, "Chapter 7: The Reckoning", the Mandalorian is contacted by Greef Karga, who says the Client has tightened his control over Nevarro as a result of the Mandalorian's actions there. Greef proposes that the Mandalorian help him kill the Client and eliminate the Imperial presence from the planet, and in exchange, he and Grogu will be safe from any further reprisals from the Guild.

The proposal is a trap, and Greef plans to ambush and kill the Mandalorian and return Grogu to the Client. Nevertheless, the Mandalorian accepts the offer and returns to the planet along with Grogu and his allies Cara Dune (Gina Carano), Kuiil (Nick Nolte), and the recently rebuilt IG-11, whom Kuiil has reprogrammed to be a nurse droid and protector for Grogu. During their voyage, the party is attacked by pterodactyl-like creatures and Greef receives what would have been a fatal injury, but Grogu uses the Force to heal him. Greef is so moved that he has a change of heart and informs the others about the trap. They devise a new plan in which Kuiil will bring Grogu back to the Mandalorian's ship, while the others will kill the Client and his troops. The plan goes wrong and Kuiil is killed by Imperial Scout Troopers, who briefly abduct Grogu before he is rescued by IG-11 at the start of the first-season finale, "Chapter 8: Redemption". IG-11 brings Grogu back to the Mandalorian, Cara, and Greef and helps defend them against an ambush by the Imperial leader Moff Gideon (Giancarlo Esposito), who is revealed to have been seeking Grogu all along. He does not reveal why he wants Grogu, but says he "means more to me than you will ever know".

After surviving an attack by Gideon's stormtroopers, during which Grogu uses the Force to deflect the fire of an attacking stormtrooper's flamethrower back against him, the group escapes with Grogu through a sewer grate. They seek help from the hidden Mandalorian tribe, but it is revealed the Imperials wiped out the tribe after they revealed themselves in "Chapter 3: The Sin". The tribe's leader, "the Armorer" (Emily Swallow), instructs the Mandalorian to watch over and protect Grogu, who she formally adopts into the Mandalorian culture as a "foundling", like the Mandalorian once was himself. She instructs the Mandalorian to seek out and deliver Grogu to the others of his kind, and that until this occurs, the Mandalorian and Grogu are a "clan of two", and that the Mandalorian will be like a father to him. She declares their signet to be a likeness of a Mudhorn, the creature the Mandalorian and Grogu worked together to kill in "Chapter 2: The Child". The group departs, and IG-11 sacrifices himself to destroy an entire squad of stormtroopers to protect Grogu. After fending off a final attack from Moff Gideon, the Mandalorian once again departs from Nevarro with Grogu.

=== Season 2 ===
Grogu accompanies the Mandalorian during his search for other Mandalorians who could help him find the child's people: the Jedi. In "Chapter 9: The Marshal", the pair return to Tatooine and meet Cobb Vanth (Timothy Olyphant), the Marshal of Mos Pelgo, who is not a true Mandalorian but wears Mandalorian armor. The Mandalorian helps Vanth slay a krayt dragon which had been attacking Mos Pelgo, in exchange for his armor. Along the way the pair arrange an uneasy alliance between the townspeople and a Tusken Raider tribe. The Mandalorian developed a deep respect for Vanth, to the point he entrusts him to look after Grogu, should he perish during his attempt to kill the dragon. In "Chapter 10: The Passenger", the Mandalorian and Grogu leave for Trask, where they must take a contact, "Frog Lady" (Misty Rosas, voiced by Dee Bradley Baker), and her eggs in exchange for a lead on other Mandalorians. During their journey, Grogu takes a liking to the eggs and eats a few of them despite being explicitly forbidden from doing so by the Mandalorian. Grogu's appetite also gets the group into trouble while stranded on Maldo Kreis, where he eats a spider-like creature's egg just as the rest of the swarm hatches. They are ultimately saved from the swarm by two X-wing pilots (Dave Filoni and Paul Sun-Hyung Lee) from the New Republic. In "Chapter 11: The Heiress", the group arrives on Trask and after bringing Frog Lady and her remaining eggs to her husband, the Mandalorian and Grogu encounter Bo-Katan Kryze (Katee Sackhoff) and two other Mandalorian warriors, who save them from a crew of Quarrens who wish to kill Grogu and steal the Mandalorian's armor. While the Mandalorian accompanies Bo-Katan's team on a mission in exchange for a lead on Jedi, Grogu is left with the Frog Man and Frog Lady, during which time the eggs hatch and Grogu bonds with the newborn tadpoles.

In "Chapter 12: The Siege", the Mandalorian and Grogu return to Nevarro for repairs to the Razor Crest, and reunite with Greef Karga and Cara Dune, who have since turned the planet around. While the Mandalorian goes with Greef, Cara, and their Mythrol companion (Horatio Sanz) to destroy the last Imperial base on Nevarro in exchange for said repairs, Grogu is left at a local school, where he uses the Force to steal some cookies from another child. This episode also provides a clue as to what the Empire's plans with Grogu are; while exploring the Imperial base, the Mandalorian and the others stumble upon cloning experiments performed by Imperial scientists, involving Grogu's blood, some of which has already been transfused to the clones to supposedly give them Force-sensitivity.

In "Chapter 13: The Jedi", the Mandalorian takes Grogu to former Jedi Ahsoka Tano (Rosario Dawson) on Corvus, who communicates with him through the Force, learning his name and that he is a former Jedi youngling who was rescued from the Jedi Temple on Coruscant during the Great Jedi Purge and hidden for his safety, which is why he suppresses his Force powers. While Ahsoka is reluctant to train Grogu because of his strong attachment to the Mandalorian, she tells the latter to take him to the Jedi Temple on Tython, where Grogu might reach out to another Jedi through the Force and choose his own destiny.

In "Chapter 14: The Tragedy", the Mandalorian brings Grogu to said temple, where he begins meditating and a protective Force field rises around him. Moff Gideon's Imperial remnant, having tracked down the Mandalorian, soon attacks in an attempt to capture Grogu, who continues his meditation while being protected by the Mandalorian and the recently arrived Boba Fett (Temuera Morrison) and Fennec Shand (Ming-Na Wen), who made a deal with the former to protect Grogu in exchange for Fett's armor (which the Mandalorian obtained from Cobb Vanth). Despite their best efforts, Grogu is captured by Gideon's Dark Troopers and taken to his Imperial cruiser, where he is imprisoned inside a holding cell. Later, Gideon witnesses Grogu using his Force powers on two stormtroopers to hurl them around the cell before collapsing in exhaustion. Gideon orders his troops to stun and cuff Grogu, and to take him to Dr. Pershing to complete the blood transfusion.

In "Chapter 16: The Rescue", the Mandalorian boards Gideon's ship to rescue Grogu, assisted by Cara, Fett, Fennec, Bo-Katan, and Koska Reeves (Mercedes Varnado). While Fett provides cover from Slave I and the others take control of the ship's bridge, the Mandalorian confronts and defeats Gideon. With Gideon captured and Grogu in their custody, the Mandalorian and his allies have their escape route cut off by a platoon of Dark Trooper droids until Luke Skywalker (Mark Hamill) arrives with R2-D2 and destroys the Dark troopers. When Luke offers to raise and train Grogu, the Mandalorian, realizing that the child's destiny is to become a Jedi, reluctantly allows him to go with Luke. During an emotional farewell, the Mandalorian removes his helmet to let Grogu see his face for the first time and promises to meet him again.

=== The Book of Boba Fett ===
Grogu appears in the sixth episode, "Chapter 6: From the Desert Comes a Stranger", of the spin-off series The Book of Boba Fett. While training with Luke, he helps Grogu remember some of his past, including his home at the Jedi Temple on Coruscant and the events of the Great Jedi Purge. The Mandalorian comes to visit Grogu, but decides against it after speaking with Ahsoka Tano, not wanting to hinder his training; however, he gives Ahsoka a gift to deliver to Grogu: beskar chain mail forged by the Armorer. Ahsoka gives the chain mail to Luke, who confesses that he is unsure whether Grogu is fully committed to the Jedi path and that he does not know how to handle the matter. Following Ahsoka's advice to listen to his instincts, Luke decides to let Grogu choose his destiny by asking him to choose between the chain mail and the lightsaber of his old master, Yoda.

In the seventh and final episode, titled "Chapter 7: In The Name of Honor", Grogu lands in Motto's hangar on Tatooine with R2-D2 in Luke's X-wing starfighter, where it is revealed that Grogu chose the beskar chain mail over Yoda's lightsaber. Motto then takes him to Mos Espa, where he reunites with the Mandalorian. He and Motto aid the Mandalorian, Boba Fett, and Fett's forces in defeating the Pyke Syndicate. However, Cad Bane (Corey Burton) scares off Fett's rancor, which goes on a rampage in Mos Espa. Grogu uses the Force to put the rancor to sleep, stopping it from causing more damage. Afterward, Grogu and the Mandalorian fly away together from Tatooine, in the Mandalorian's new Naboo N-1 starfighter.

=== Season 3 ===
Grogu accompanies the Mandalorian on his travels as he attempts to atone for breaking the Creed by removing his helmet. In "Chapter 17: The Apostate", the Mandalorian has IG-11 partially repaired as a prospective companion, but IG-11 defaults to his original programming and attempts to kill Grogu before once again being destroyed. In "Chapter 18: The Mines of Mandalore", Pelli Motto sells R5-D4 to the Mandalorian and the three travel to Mandalore. When the Mandalorian is captured by a cyborg in the mines, Grogu flies with R5 in the N-1 to Kalevala to fetch Bo-Katan to rescue the captured Mandalorian. After the rescue, Bo-Katan leads Grogu and the Mandalorian to the Living Waters and Grogu witnesses the Mandalorian bathe himself. In "Chapter 19: The Convert", the trio are attacked by Imperial starfighters in Kalevala, forcing them to flee to the Mandalorian's convert, where Grogu witnesses the Mandalorian's redemption and Bo-Katan's induction.

In "Chapter 20: The Foundling", Grogu trains with fellow foundling Ragnar Vizsla (Wesley Kimmel) until Ragnar is captured by a large winged Raptor. While the Mandalorian, Bo-Katan, and Ragnar's father Paz (Jon Favreau) leave to rescue him, Grogu joins the Armorer at the Forge, where she teaches him Mandalorian culture and forges him a beskar rondel. The Forge triggers more of Grogu's memories of the Great Jedi Purge, revealing that he escaped Coruscant with the help of Jedi Master Kelleran Beq (Ahmed Best) and sympathetic members of the Naboo Armed Forces.

In "Chapter 21: The Pirate" and "Chapter 22: Guns for Hire", Grogu tags along as Bo-Katan and the Mandalorian bring together their respective tribes. In "Chapter 23: The Spies", Grogu is given IG-12, a human-sized mecha made from the remains of IG-11, which he uses both to walk and to speak, although he can use only the words "Yes" and "No". When a quarrel breaks out between two Mandalorians from different tribes as they cross the ruined surface of Mandalore, Grogu intervenes to calm tensions and restore the peace.

In "Chapter 24: The Return", Grogu saves the Mandalorian after he is captured and helps him fight his way through Moff Gideon's base on Mandalore. Grogu faces off against three Praetorian Guards, which destroy his IG-12 suit; he uses the Force to defeat the guards and Moff Gideon, and later to shield himself, the Mandalorian, and Bo-Katan from a fiery explosion. Once Mandalore is reclaimed, the Mandalorian adopts Grogu as his son and apprentice, and he is given the name Din Grogu by the Armorer. The pair leave Mandalore so that Din Grogu can complete his apprenticeship.

=== Future ===
At Disney's first quarter 2024 earnings call, CEO Bob Iger announced that a new Star Wars movie was being developed "that brings the Mandalorian and Grogu to the big screen for the very first time." This film was later revealed to be The Mandalorian and Grogu which was released in May 2026.

== Characterization ==
Physically, Grogu closely resembles Yoda, sharing his signature green skin and long, pointed ears. Grogu is small in size, with wide eyes, short hairs, and wrinkled skin. Grogu is capable of sitting up, crawling, walking, and eating. He appears capable of understanding some language spoken around him, but cannot speak except in baby-like babble noises. Anthony Breznican of Vanity Fair stated: "There is an emotional transference happening here. The audience cares more about the unnamed, faceless Mandalorian because he cares so much about Baby Yoda." Rebecca Keegan of The Hollywood Reporter believes Grogu displays a form of wisdom despite his young age, describing him as "a Dalai Lama in toddler form". Jeanne Cavelos, former NASA astrophysicist and author of The Science of Star Wars, also believes Grogu demonstrates intelligence beyond his years, noting his awareness and empathy toward beings even when their faces or bodies are covered completely, as well as his ability to recognize injury in others and attempt to repair it.

Despite his youth, Grogu demonstrates a considerable ability to use and manipulate the Force, such as when he lifts the large Mudhorn creature into the air in "Chapter 2: The Child", and when he deflects the fire of an attacking stormtrooper's flamethrower back against him in "Chapter 8: Redemption". Kevin Melrose of Comic Book Resources noted that in the original Star Wars trilogy film The Empire Strikes Back (1980), Luke Skywalker struggled to lift an X-wing fighter due to its large size, so the fact that Grogu can lift heavy objects despite his diminutive size and young age demonstrates the vastness of his Force powers. Grogu also repeatedly shows a desire to use the Force to help those around him, such as when he attempts to heal the Mandalorian's wounds in "Chapter 2: The Child", and when he heals Greef Karga's near-fatal wounds in "Chapter 7: The Reckoning". However, after using the Force in this manner, Grogu is often exhausted and slips into unconsciousness, indicating that he is still developing his power and does not yet have the skills to fully control it. Despite his raw natural ability with the Force, Grogu is untrained and still depends heavily on the Mandalorian and other allies for protection. Grogu has a sweet temperament, and comes across as innocent and kindhearted to most of the people he encounters, but is also occasionally capable of violence, such as during a scene in "Chapter 7: The Reckoning" when he uses the Force to choke Cara Dune while she is engaging the Mandalorian in a friendly arm wrestling match and in "Chapter 14: The Tragedy" when Grogu slams two stormtroopers together while imprisoned by Moff Gideon.

== Concept and creation ==
=== Conception ===
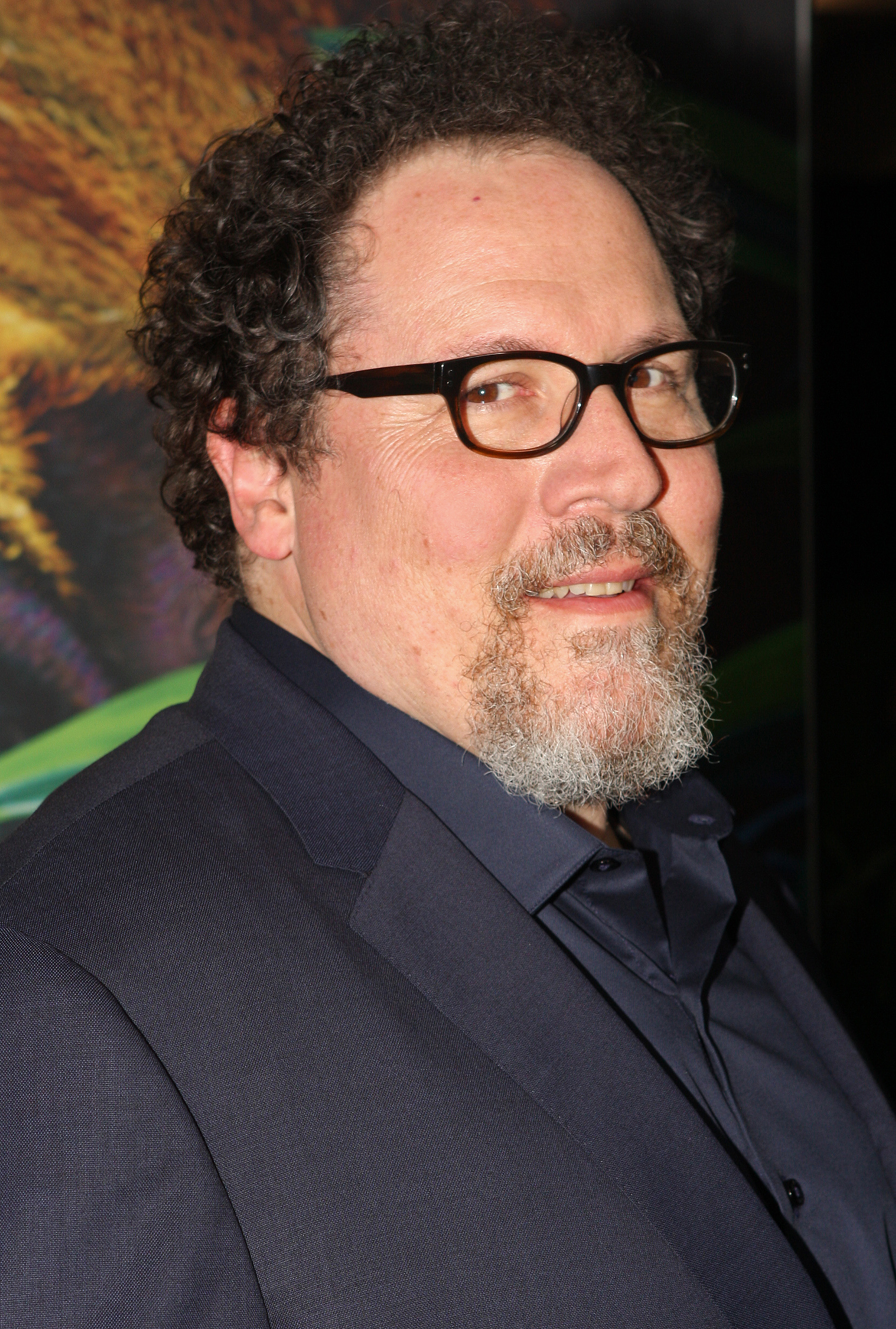
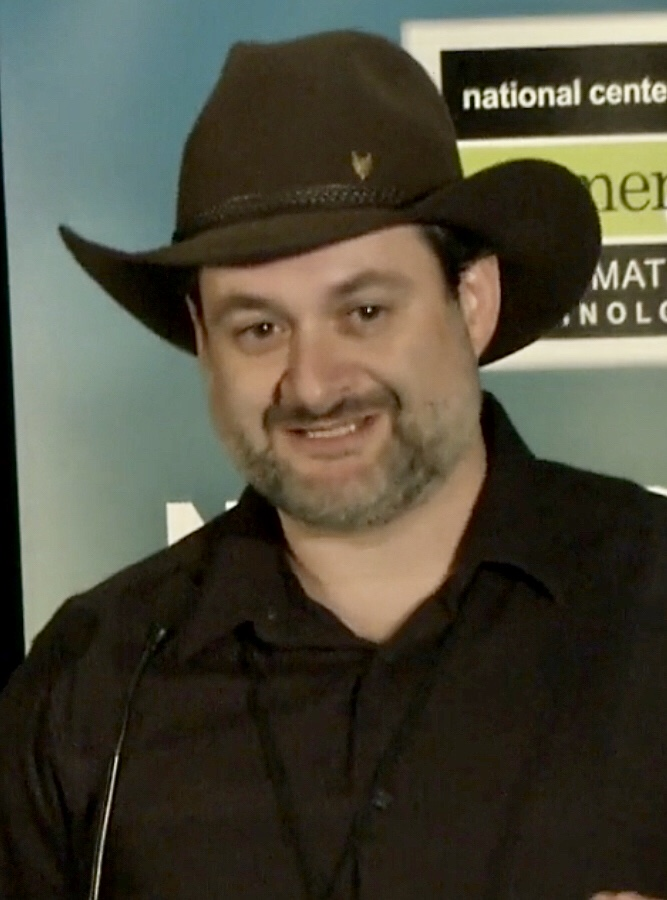
Grogu was created by The Mandalorian creator and showrunner Jon Favreau (left), and the character was developed in early conversations between Favreau and executive producer Dave Filoni (right).

Grogu was conceived by Jon Favreau, the creator and showrunner of The Mandalorian. Upon learning that Lucasfilm had been sold to the Walt Disney Company in 2012, Favreau began imagining working on a Star Wars project, and was particularly interested in exploring the events after the original Star Wars trilogy. He conceived Grogu based upon a desire to explore the mystery around Yoda and his species, and an interest in presenting a character from Yoda's species at the beginning of his journey, in contrast to Yoda ending his own journey in Return of the Jedi (1983). Favreau believed part of the appeal of Yoda was that George Lucas deliberately kept his origins and details about the species mysterious, and Favreau believed that sense of mystery would extend to Grogu: "I think that's why people are so curious about this little one of the same species."

In mid-2017, shortly after Favreau pitched The Mandalorian to Lucasfilm President Kathleen Kennedy, she suggested he meet with Dave Filoni, who had co-created several Star Wars animated series. Filoni said of his meeting with Favreau:

When he brought up in the very beginning of doing this child and having it be of Yoda's species, I was like, 'Oh, that's very tricky, because there's never been this before outside of Yoda, and then Yaddle in the prequels on the Jedi Council. It's kind of a sacred thing ... We just have to be responsible when we're telling a story with what we're deciding to do. The fans want to know things are a calculated, careful decision. Then if you tell a good story, most of the time they go with it.

The character of Grogu was further developed in early conversations between Favreau and Filoni, the latter of whom drew a rough sketch of the character on cocktail napkins during the talks. Multiple artists worked to refine the image of Grogu created by Filoni, but the definitive imagery came from a concept drawing by artist Christian Alzmann, which depicted the character's makeshift garment. Favreau said of this rendering: "It looked cute, but it also looked a little weird. That's part of Yoda. It can't just be cute. It can't just be a straight-up Disney baby, it has to be a little bit tweaked." The team sought to establish mannerisms and expressions for Grogu that would remind viewers of a pet with whom they might share a connection. These characteristics include Grogu's ears, posture, and the way he cocks his head.

Disney CEO Bob Iger said of Grogu: "The moment I laid eyes on the character, I had a strong feeling that it was going to connect with audiences. So cute, so interesting, so compelling. So familiar and yet so new." Favreau has clarified that Grogu is not a younger version of Yoda himself, but has declined to comment upon whether he is related to Yoda or otherwise connected to him.

=== Development ===
Grogu is mostly a work of animatronics and puppetry, although accentuated with computer-generated imagery (CGI). Legacy Effects, the special effects studio started by protégés of special make-up effects creator Stan Winston, designed the Grogu puppet and supplied the puppeteers to animate it during filming. The puppet cost about $5 million to make, and is relatively heavy due to the amount of wires and animatronic technology inside it. It is controlled by two technicians, one who operates the eyes and mouth and another who controls other facial expressions. There are several stand-in versions for Grogu used in filming in addition to the primary puppet. The crew of The Mandalorian wanted to use animatronics for Grogu as often as possible. However, they also shot versions of the character's scenes both with and without the puppet, so they had the option of replacing it with a CGI effect in post-production if the puppet did not look satisfactory. When CGI is used, Favreau said they try to make the character obey the same physical laws that he would if he were a puppet, adding: "I think a lot of times CG makes itself too obvious where you don't create parameters creatively that allow the character to keep the same identity and charm."

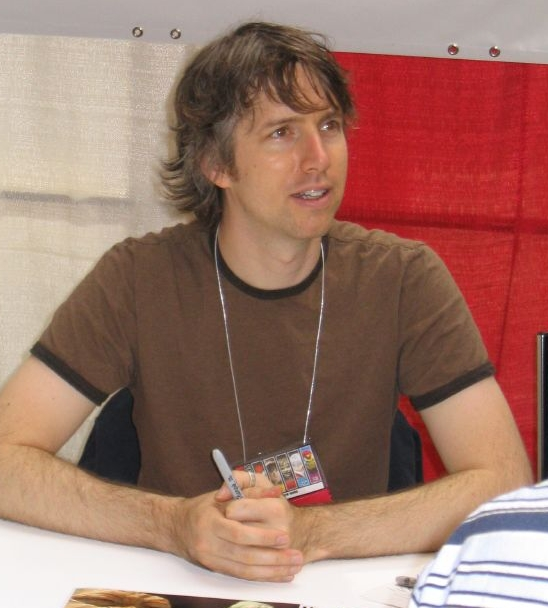
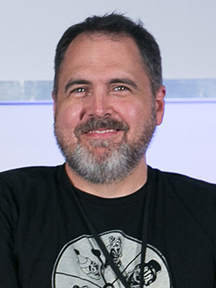
The voice and sounds of Grogu were created by sound editors Matthew Wood (left) and David Acord (right).

The voice and sounds of Grogu were created by David Acord and Matthew Wood, sound editors with Skywalker Sound, who had previously worked on various Star Wars projects. Acord recorded animals' noises at a wildlife rescue near San Diego, and used recordings of a bat-eared fox and kinkajou to make the initial version of Grogu's voice. However, Favreau suggested the voice needed to sound more human-like and relatable to audiences, so instead the animal sounds were scaled back and used only for small grunts and cooing noises. Actual infant vocals were used to create the new version of Grogu's voice, and Acord used a highly-pitched version of his voice for some of the more articulated vocalizations. Acord also previously voiced Rotta the Hutt, the young Huttlet son of Jabba the Hutt, in the animated film Star Wars: The Clone Wars (2008). In "Chapter 23: The Spies", Taika Waititi voices IG-12, a pilotable exoskeleton built by the Anzellans (from IG-11's remains) to be controlled by Grogu, whom Grogu speaks through by clicking buttons to say "yes" and "no".

=== Filming ===
The character was referred to as "the Child" in screenplays for The Mandalorian, though Bryce Dallas Howard, who directed "Chapter 4: Sanctuary", said she always referred to him on set simply as "Baby", and other cast members called it "The Being". During filming, the director of each episode would communicate with Grogu's puppeteers to discuss what was happening in the scene, what emotions Grogu should express, and what actions the character should take. Director Deborah Chow said in this way, it was similar to providing direction to a living actor. Favreau encouraged the directors to test and push the boundaries of the Grogu puppet during filming, urging them to experiment and attempt to get the most realistic movements and mannerisms possible from the character. Brendan Wayne, a body double for the Mandalorian character, said the puppet looked so realistic that performing against it felt like working with an actual child actor. Rick Famuyiwa, the director of "Chapter 2: The Child", said he was shocked when he learned that the premiere episode of The Mandalorian ended with the introduction of Grogu, because it meant he would be directing the next episode that further expanded upon the character.

The Grogu puppet was popular on set with the show's cast and crew. Chow said: "With the baby, every time it came on set, the whole crew would respond to it. Even the grip department, every production assistant is coming to the monitors, trying to see it." Howard screamed in excitement when she first saw it, and Gina Carano said of Grogu: "That was our precious. Our precious is this being that we all end up taking care of in some way." Emily Swallow said she "fell in love with it like everybody else", adding: "I was thrilled when they brought him in that little bag for the scene that I got to have with it. I just wanted to snuggle it." Amy Sedaris said the animatronic Grogu puppet made everyone on the set happy: "The minute you looked into Baby Yoda's eyes you just got lost." Likewise, Giancarlo Esposito said he enjoyed interacting with the Grogu puppet during filming: "It melts my heart, because the reality is, this little baby does things that you could never imagine and when you look at those eyes and that little body, how can you not help but fall in love?" Carl Weathers has said of him: "He is very interesting and very knowledgeable and very cute. I never use that word, but he is a cute little guy."

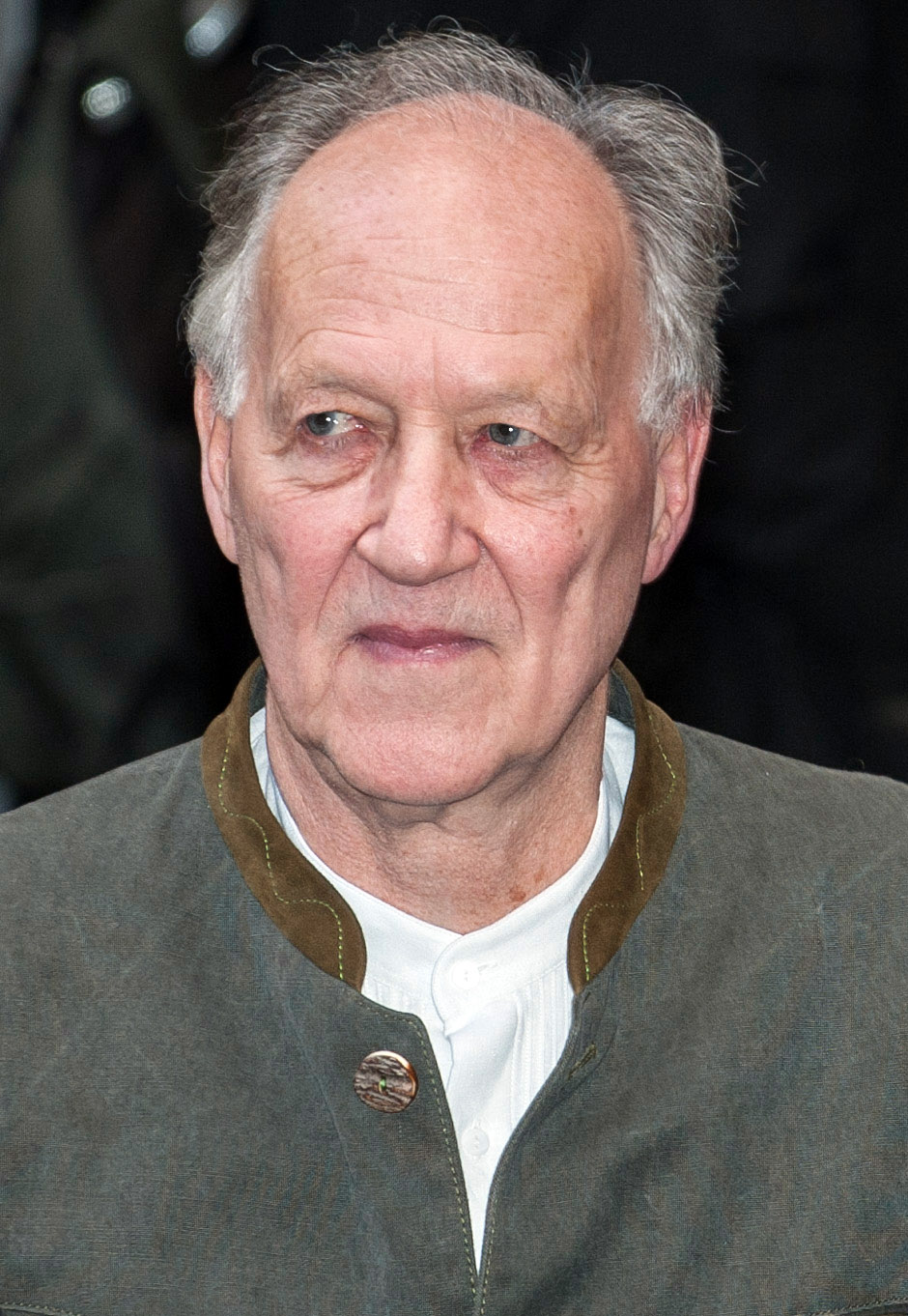
Werner Herzog, who portrays The Client in The Mandalorian, strongly urged the show's producers to remain committed to the animatronics and puppetry for Grogu, calling them "cowards" for considering using computer-generated imagery.

Werner Herzog particularly enjoyed filming scenes with the animatronic Grogu puppet, which he called "heartbreakingly beautiful". Chow said directing the scene between Herzog and Grogu in "Chapter 3: The Sin" was "one of the weirdest" moments of her career, because he had so much affection for the puppet and was interacting with it like it was a living being. She said: "I literally think that he had forgotten that it's not a real-live creature and he had fallen in love with it." Herzog strongly urged the Mandalorian filmmakers to use the puppet for the character and not CGI. While filming one scene, Dave Filoni began to remove the puppet to shoot an alternate take, in case they decided to use a CGI version of Grogu in its place. Herzog passionately urged him not to do so and to remain committed to the animatronics and puppetry, saying: "You are cowards. Leave it. Leave it." Esposito has also said having an actual Grogu puppet to perform against has been beneficial for the cast, because "that space allows all of us to be so wowed by its presence".

Misty Rosas, who delivered the motion capture performance for Kuiil, often held the Grogu puppet during her scenes in "Chapter 7: The Reckoning". This occasionally proved challenging for Rosas, who also had to manage the weight of the animatronics in her costume and face mask, as well as the weight of the Grogu prop. One full day of filming the episode focused upon Kuiil riding the blurrg creature, a process Rosas described as "intense" due to the amount of time she spent on the fake creature and the speeds at which it was made to run. The process was made further challenging because she was carrying the heavy animatronic Grogu puppet throughout the scenes, and she occasionally needed breaks between takes. Rosas said: "My legs are not exactly long, so I was squeezing for dear life and holding the baby." Nevertheless, Rosas said she enjoyed working with Grogu character, saying: "He just melts my heart, he's so cute."

During the opening scene of "Chapter 8: Redemption", an Imperial Scout Trooper portrayed by comedian Adam Pally punched Grogu. During the first take of filming the scene, Pally punched the animatronic Grogu puppet hard, prompting Favreau to inform the actor that the puppet cost about $5 million to make. This made Pally so nervous that he missed Grogu altogether when he tried to punch him in the three subsequent takes. Pally joked about working with Grogu: "I gotta tell you, the truth is that Baby Yoda is a bit of a diva. He's constantly vaping." At some point during filming of The Mandalorian, George Lucas visited the set and held the Grogu puppet. Favreau posted a picture of Lucas holding Grogu on Instagram on January 16, 2020, which drew considerable Internet attention.

=== Prerelease ===
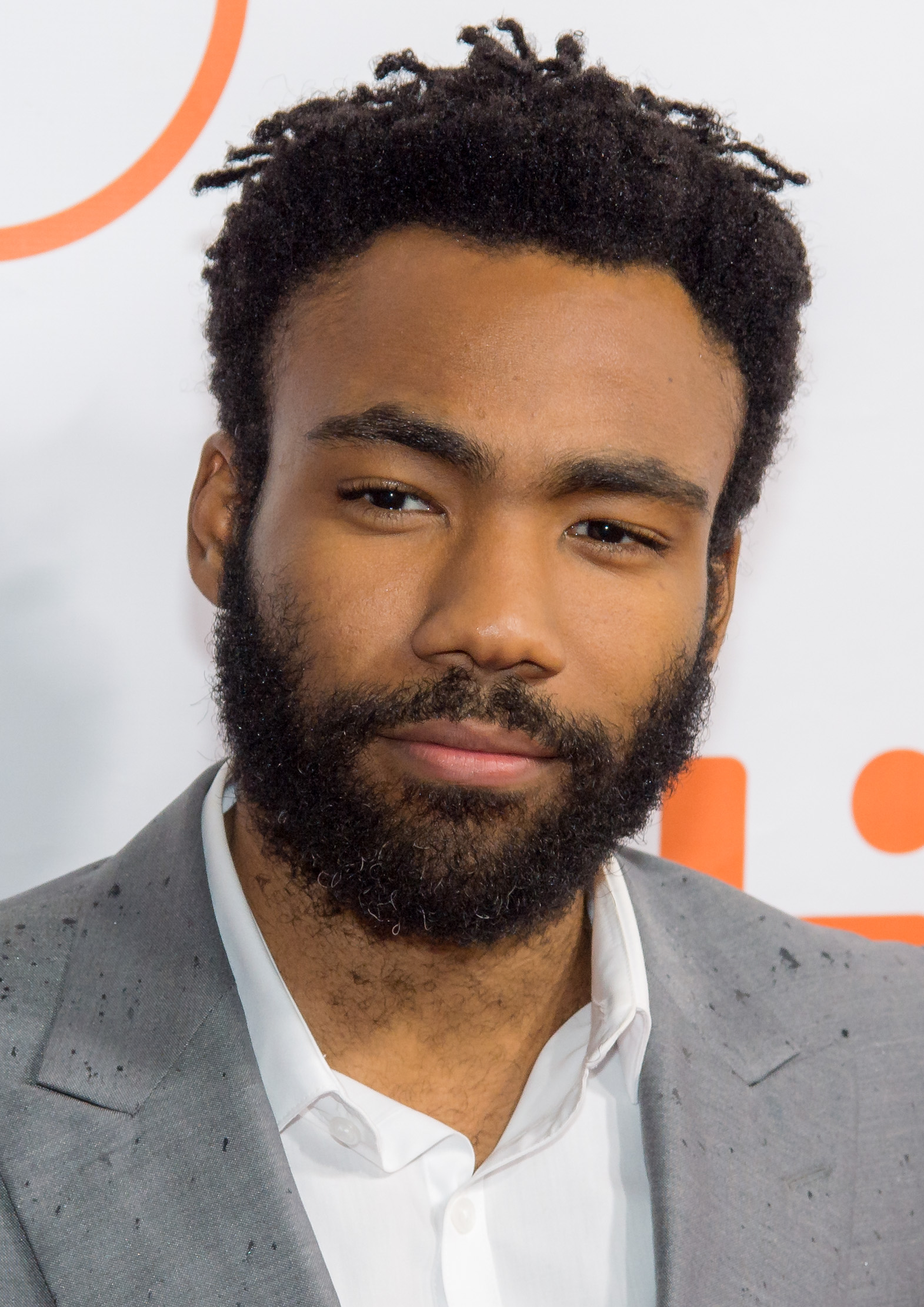
Jon Favreau has credited actor Donald Glover (pictured) with inspiring the decision to keep Grogu's revelation a secret.

Grogu was kept secret and was deliberately withheld from The Mandalorian's prerelease marketing and merchandise plans due to the risk that details about the character could leak before the show aired. Favreau said of this plan: "I think that part of what people really value is to be surprised and delighted, and I think that's becoming all too rare." Favreau has credited Donald Glover as the source of that strategy. While developing The Mandalorian, Favreau was simultaneously directing Glover in the 2019 photorealistic remake of The Lion King (1994). While discussing music and pop culture, Glover told Favreau that people enjoy being surprised, because true surprises had become much less common in the Internet era. As an example, Glover cited the excitement generated by the sudden releases of surprise albums by singer Beyoncé. Favreau felt keeping Grogu a secret until he was revealed would allow fans to connect with the character and "discover the story as it was unfolding". The leadership and marketing team at the Walt Disney Company was supportive of this strategy. Screeners of the pilot episode were not distributed to reviewers to avoid leaks about Grogu, and the official Lucasfilm and Star Wars social media accounts did not start posting messages about Grogu until about a week after the series debuted, to avoid spoiling the character's debut as much as possible.

== Themes ==
=== Parenting and fatherhood ===
One of the primary themes of The Mandalorian is parenting and fatherhood, particularly through the father-son relationship dynamic between the Mandalorian and Grogu. Ryan Britt of Fatherly wrote: "For years the Star Wars franchise avoided depicting a parent-child dynamic. With Mando and Baby Yoda, that's finally changing." Vulture writer Kathryn VanArendonk argued that parenting has been the subject of past Star Wars stories, but almost always during later stages of parenthood, rather than an infant in early developmental stages such as Grogu. As examples, she cited Obi-Wan Kenobi serving as a mentor to the adolescent Anakin Skywalker, Princess Leia lamenting over her grown son Kylo Ren, or the absence of Rey's parents. Several reviewers have compared the dynamic between Grogu and the Mandalorian to Lone Wolf and Cub, a manga about a samurai warrior and his young son. Grogu makes the Mandalorian a softer and more relatable character; he changes in a positive way because of raising Grogu, becoming less selfish and self-absorbed. Several examples of the Mandalorian parenting Grogu appear throughout the series, such as when he stops Grogu from pressing random buttons in the cockpit of the Mandalorian's spaceship, ultimately by holding him in his lap. In another example, the Mandalorian sets up a car seat for Grogu in the cockpit of his ship, so he can be seated safely and comfortably during their travels.

The relationship between the Mandalorian and Grogu is an example of unexpected fatherhood. The Mandalorian feels a connection and parental bond with Grogu because of his own childhood, when he was orphaned upon the death of his parents and was adopted by the Mandalorian culture as a "foundling". Nevertheless, fatherhood was not a role the Mandalorian was initially seeking, and he makes repeated initial attempts to avoid this responsibility. He first does so in "Chapter 3: The Sin", when he leaves Grogu with the Client, and then again in "Chapter 4: Sanctuary", when he plans to leave Grogu with Omera, a protective mother on the planet Sorgan who is willing to take Grogu into her own family. The Mandalorian does not fully commit to the role of fatherhood until the first-season finale, "Chapter 8: Redemption" when Grogu himself is also adopted into the Mandalorian culture as a "foundling" and the Mandalorian is formally declared to be his father figure.

Anthony Breznican of Vanity Fair has noted that none of the day-to-day difficulties of parenthood are portrayed in the series: "There is no shrill squawking from Baby Yoda, no tantrum, no spit-up, no uncontrollable shrieking that burrows into a parent's psyche like a dentist's drill shredding a soft, pink nerve." Likewise, Vulture writer Kathryn VanArendonk said the show ignores or does not address many parenting details that make fatherhood difficult, such as what Grogu eats, when he goes to sleep, and whether he wears diapers. She wrote: "The Mandalorian is uninterested in diapers, and so Mando gets to be a very particular image of fatherhood: the guy who doesn't have to sweat the small stuff." VanAnderonk described this as a wish fulfillment fantasy for parents or prospective parents: "a vision of parenting stripped so thoroughly of all detail and specificity that all that's left are archetypes: the parent, the child".

Grogu encounters a handful of other protector figures throughout the first season, including Omera, IG-11, and Peli Motto. Some observers have criticized the series for the fact that the Mandalorian repeatedly leaves Grogu alone or in the hands of relative strangers, as well as for making decisions that place Grogu in danger. One example is in "Chapter 6: The Prisoner", when he allows a team of dangerous mercenaries to use his ship while Grogu is on board, nearly resulting in Grogu's death. An interaction the Mandalorian has with Peli Motto in "Chapter 5: The Gunslinger" is one of the most overt discussions about the challenges of caring for Grogu. When the Mandalorian accidentally wakes Grogu, who had been sleeping in Peli's arms, she chides him: "Do you have any idea how long it took me to get it to sleep?" She also condemns the Mandalorian for leaving Grogu alone on the ship, saying: "you have an awful lot to learn about raising a young one". ScreenCrush writer Matt Singer argued the Mandalorian's parenting errors make the show that much more appealing and relatable because making mistakes is a large part of being a parent.

=== Good and evil; nature versus nurture ===
One scene in "Chapter 7: The Reckoning" led many fans to reevaluate Grogu and question whether he may demonstrate evil tendencies. During a scene on the Mandalorian's spaceship, Grogu observes as the Mandalorian and Cara Dune engage in a friendly arm wrestling match. During the contest, Grogu uses the Force to choke Cara, nearly strangling her to death before the Mandalorian intervenes. Throughout the Star Wars franchise, that ability has been most commonly associated with the dark side of the Force, and particularly with the antagonist character Darth Vader. Sarah Bea Milner of Screen Rant wrote: "The moment is genuinely shocking – and more than a little disturbing." Some reviewers noted, however, that Grogu likely mistakenly believed the Mandalorian was in danger and intervened to help. Additionally, in the same episode, Grogu uses the Force to heal and save Greef Karga, a power typically associated with the Light Side. Peter Foy of Comic Book Resources wrote: "It doesn't exactly seem realistic that Disney would blow its merchandising potential with the little cutie by going all Damien (The Omen) in his storyline."

Nevertheless, some writers have suggested viewers had been underestimating Grogu's capacity for evil because he is cute. Fans speculated Grogu could be presenting a false personality or using the Force to manipulate people into caring about him to help ensure his survival. Esquire writer Matt Miller noted that Yoda lied about his identity during his initial appearance in The Empire Strikes Back, posing as a simple-minded observer to Luke Skywalker before revealing himself to be a Jedi Master. Miller suggested Grogu could be putting on a similar performance. One fan theory suggests Grogu could be related to a prophecy in a past Star Wars work that predicted an evil that could consume the galaxy. The prophecy, described in the novel Star Wars: Master and Apprentice (2019), says: "The danger of the past is not past, but sleeps in an egg. When the egg cracks, it will threaten the galaxy entire." Fans theorized this could refer to Grogu, who sleeps in an egg-like bassinet in The Mandalorian. Others have theorized the reason the Imperial remnant wants Grogu is to turn him over to the dark side of the Force, or for use as a weapon. Moff Gideon in the season finale says, "You may think you have some idea what you're in possession of, but you do not." Peter Foy of Comic Book Resources suggested this could allude to Grogu's potential to cause mass destruction.

Caitlin Gallagher of Bustle suggested rather than building toward Grogu becoming evil, the show could be suggesting the Mandalorian needs to find a way to raise Grogu in a less violent environment. All season long, Grogu has witnessed those around him committing violent acts. For example, Vulture writer Keith Phipps noticed that when IG-11 kills multiple stormtroopers in front of him, Grogu has a "look of wonder" in his eyes, which Phipps said "is hilarious, but also a little chilling". Some writers applied a nature versus nurture argument to this, contending Grogu is becoming violent because of what he is learning based on the actions around him. This suggests Grogu is not inherently good or evil, but that instead, like all children, he is impressionable and does not fully understand the events occurring around him. He is learning about life and needs guidance as he develops his abilities. This is why he uses Force powers generally associated with both the light and dark sides of the Force. It will largely fall to the Mandalorian to provide this guidance, as when the Mandalorian stops him from strangling Cara.

== Cultural impact ==
=== Critical reception ===
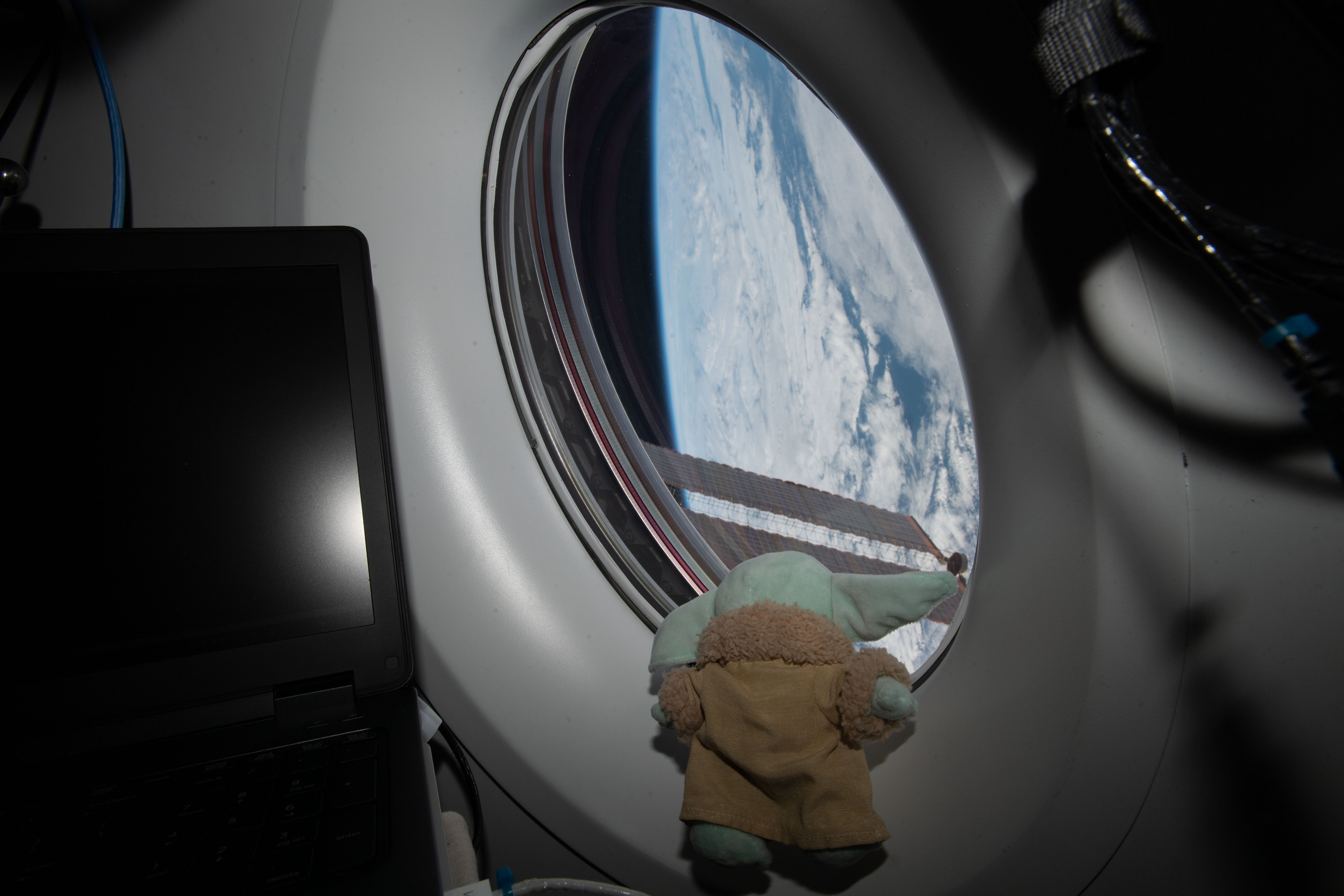
A plush of Grogu on the interior of Crew Dragon Resilience during the SpaceX Crew-1 mission

Grogu has received a positive reception from fans and reviewers, and is widely considered the show's breakout character. Fans immediately adopted the nickname "Baby Yoda" to describe the character, a moniker Favreau has embraced as "the easiest, shortest, most hashtagable way to identify that character". However, the nickname is not used internally by the crew of The Mandalorian, and Disney CEO Bob Iger said he "got [his] wrist slapped" by Favreau for calling the character Baby Yoda in e-mail messages. Iger later said the scale of the positive reaction to Grogu was "beyond my expectations by a wide margin".

Several writers described Grogu as a pop culture phenomenon, particularly noting the adoration it had received from fans on social media. The Guardian called Baby Yoda "2019's biggest new character", and Bryan Alexander of USA Today wrote: "There's nothing hotter in the universe than Baby Yoda." Some critics noted that fandom for Grogu transcended age and experience, and that few fictional characters unite entire fan bases in the way Grogu had; Anthony Breznican of Vanity Fair wrote: "In an era of bitter division on nearly all matters, there is seemingly unanimous adoration for this tiny alien creature."

Vox writer Allegra Frank said Grogu made The Mandalorian "instantly more memorable and evocative", and alleviated the solitude and tension that might otherwise have surrounded the show's protagonist. Carolyn Giardina of The Hollywood Reporter said Grogu helped The Mandalorian not only achieve critical and commercial success, but also impact the cultural zeitgeist. Beyond the show, other writers have described the character as a key component in the success of Disney's rollout of the Disney+ streaming service. Julia Alexander of The Verge wrote: "There's no question that Baby Yoda is driving interest in Disney+". Some critics called Grogu one of the best and most lauded new Star Wars characters in recent memory, while others said the character had made the Star Wars franchise relevant to an even wider range of audiences.

Vulture writer Madison Malone Kircher described Grogu as an example of a character so popular that his fame nearly eclipsed that of his own franchise, comparing him to Baby Groot from the Guardians of the Galaxy films. The Guardian writer Zach Vasquez noted past Star Wars works had featured young characters that have not resonated as strongly as Grogu, so he credited his success with the character's designers and special effects. Likewise, Robyn Bahr of The Hollywood Reporter said the positive response to Grogu, along with that of the show The Dark Crystal: Age of Resistance, demonstrate that audiences still desire puppetry, animatronics, and practical effects rather than only CGI. Bahr wrote: "If Baby Yoda were entirely 3D animation, he wouldn't have become an icon the minute we laid our eyes on him."

Grogu was featured on the cover of the December 2019 issue of The Hollywood Reporter, along with the headline: "Baby Yoda represents the future of Hollywood". In an article in the magazine, writer Rebecca Keegan argued Grogu is the culmination of several shifts and trends in the entertainment industry over the decade prior to the release of The Mandalorian. These include the decline of the traditional movie star, the growth of streaming media services, the rise of Internet culture, and technological advances in CGI. Variety writer Caroline Framke said she fell in love with the character even despite acknowledging that he is an "inherently manipulative product of the most powerful media conglomerate".

Not all reviews of Grogu were positive. An online report conducting an analysis of which U.S. states responded most positively to Grogu, finding that interest in him was highest in Utah, and lowest in Mississippi. Rolling Stone writer Alan Sepinwall said the reveal of Grogu was a rehash of the appearance of Rotta the Hutt in Star Wars: The Clone Wars. Emily VanDerWerff of Vox described the character as "yet another merchandising opportunity" and did not feel the character was worth Disney attempting to keep secret before his reveal. BBC writer Caryn James said she did not believe anyone without an emotional attachment to Star Wars would care about Grogu. Jeremy Gordon of The Outline called Grogu the "product of a merciless capitalist machine" intended primarily to generate merchandising revenue for Disney. Gordon wrote: "It's not really Baby Yoda I hate, of course. He's really cute. It's the feeling that I'm being pandered to, that all of this is a foregone conclusion." Emma Gray Ellis wrote that there was some backlash to Grogu on social media in response to the character's massive Internet popularity. She wrote: "There's something grindingly, performatively grouchy in leaping forward to damn something that 'everyone' likes, in no small part because everyone likes it."

Grogu ranked first on several Screen Rant lists about the series, including the most interesting characters from the first season of The Mandalorian, the best characters from the show, and the best costumes from the first season.

=== Internet memes ===
Grogu quickly became a popular Internet meme. In the week following the debut of The Mandalorian, Grogu was driving almost twice as many social media interactions on news stories about it as any of the 2020 Democratic presidential candidates. The Baby Yoda search term saw continuous growth on Google Trends in the weeks following the release of The Mandalorian. There were 2.28 million social media interactions about the characters on news stories in the first two weeks after the release of The Mandalorian, and two million tweets featuring the words "Baby Yoda" were sent on Twitter between November 12 and December 5, 2019. When Favreau tweeted a concept art image of the character by artist Christian Alzmann on November 19, it received more than 34,000 retweets and 217,000 likes within one week. Various celebrities have tweeted about the character, including Ariana Grande, Elon Musk, Dwayne Johnson, Russell Wilson, Alex Rodriguez, and Donald Trump Jr. Zach Vasquez of The Guardian wrote: "It's now practically impossible to scroll through any social media platform without being inundated with pics, videos, memes and gifs of the bug-eyed, big-eared tot." The Los Angeles Times included Grogu in its list of "2019's Internet Obsessions", with writer Christie D'Zurilla writing: "Baby Yoda won the Internet in 2019."

One of the more popular memes involved a screenshot from "Chapter 4: Sanctuary" in which Grogu casually sips from a mug of soup, which has been compared to a similar meme of Kermit the Frog passive-aggressively sipping a glass of tea. Another popular meme used a scene from that episode in which Grogu randomly presses buttons in the cockpit of the Mandalorian's spaceship, with most of the memes changing the audio so that it appeared Grogu was trying to put various songs on the radio. In late November 2019, the online GIF database Giphy temporarily removed its GIFs of Grogu due to "confusion" over the legal status of the images, sparking outrage among fans. However, they were quickly restored, and Giphy issued an apology to Disney for having removed them. Various sports teams have created their own memes with Grogu, including Los Angeles Clippers, New York Islanders, Phoenix Suns, Pittsburgh Steelers, San Francisco Giants, Sacramento Kings, Seattle Mariners, and Tennessee Volunteers football.

=== Cultural references ===
In December 2019, artwork of Disney CEO Bob Iger with Grogu appeared in the Time magazine article naming Iger their Businessperson of the Year. The New Yorker published a cartoon of a woman pushing a baby stroller and saying to the baby inside it: "No offense, but Baby Yoda, like, blows you out of the water." Ice2Ice, a musician associated with the website The Ringer, released "Dear Baby Yoda: A Love Song" on December 3, 2019, with the music based upon the song "Dear Theodosia" from the musical Hamilton. The character was also mentioned in the December 2019 South Park episode "Basic Cable". In the episode, a character named Scott Malkinson attempts to get Disney+ because the woman he is interested in loves Grogu, so he believes she will love him too if he gets the streaming service. Grogu was also parodied multiple times on Saturday Night Live's Weekend Update segment by comedian Kyle Mooney, starting on the December 14, 2019 episode, in which he gossiped about the Mandalorian cast, talked about his future business ventures, and threatened Baby Groot. At the 77th Golden Globe Awards, host Ricky Gervais jokingly mistook Joe Pesci for "Baby Yoda". On February 20, the United States Army revealed that a M1 Abrams tank belonging to the 3rd Infantry Division of Fort Stewart in Georgia had been named after Grogu, with the words "BABY YODA" printed on the barrel of its gun. Some critics have noted that other media companies introduced young versions of their own characters following the debut of Grogu, and suggested they could be attempts to capitalize on Grogu's success. As an example, Ashley Carman of The Verge cited "Baby Sonic", a young version of the video game character Sonic the Hedgehog who appears in his 2020 film, which she described as "like something ripped out of Disney's playbook".

=== Merchandise ===
I think that part of what people really value is to be surprised and delighted, and I think that's becoming all too rare. It's very difficult to keep secrets about projects you're working on. By holding back on that one product, we knew that we may have had the disadvantage of not having toys available day and date, but what we got in exchange was an excitement surrounding the character, because everybody felt like they discovered him together.

— Jon Favreau

Due to the secrecy surrounding Grogu, designs of the character were withheld from product manufacturers in the months prior to the release of The Mandalorian. As a result, toys and merchandise of the character were not available in time for the 2019 Christmas season, despite a high demand for them. The Walt Disney Company accepted this plan despite knowing it would cost the company merchandising revenue in the short term; Favreau said "they understood the value of it". Iger said if Grogu's design had been distributed for toys before the show's release, "it would have gone out to hundreds and hundreds of people, probably all over the world, and we didn't want to do that". Iger reiterated that Disney is a story-first company which has "never set out to tell a story simply because it can become a toy or a game or a consumer product of some sort", and he described the wait to unveil Grogu as "worth it". The Amazon product research tool Jungle Scout projected that Disney may have lost $2.7 million in revenue because of the delay in release merchandise of Grogu; demand for toys of Grogu were so high that Amazon customers searched for Baby Yoda products more than 90,000 times in one month. David Lazarus, consumer columnist for the Los Angeles Times, said he understood Disney's strategy, but felt the company missed out on significant commercial opportunity: "The fact that they didn't anticipate that this was going to be a commercial goldmine is insane, and that they let this opportunity slip away strikes me as sheer madness."

Due to the scarcity of licensed merchandise of Grogu, many unlicensed products featuring the character were created and sold through the Internet, including via websites like Etsy. These included felt and crocheted dolls, shirts, jewellery, Christmas ornaments, art prints, bumper stickers, coffee mugs, and more. Do it yourself videos were also produced showing how fans could make their own toys based upon Grogu. The top 47 unofficial Grogu products by Amazon merchants sold an average of 1,842 pieces of merchandise in the month following the show's release, at an average of $23 per product. In mid-January 2020, Disney issued takedown notices against several Etsy sellers using the words "Star Wars", "Mandalorian", and "Yoda", citing copyright violations. Official soft goods such as T-shirts were the first to be made available because they were the easiest to produce. The first two official dolls of Grogu released were a 10-inch Funko figurine and an 11-inch plush toy from Mattel, which began shipping in February. Pre-orders for the Funko doll made it the top toy on Amazon upon its release. More official merchandise was expected to be released in early 2020. In December 2019, the Electronic Arts video game The Sims 4 added "The Child Statue" as a purchasable decoration.

Several toys of Grogu were announced American International Toy Fair in New York City in February 2020, most notably a nearly life-sized animatronic Grogu toy by Hasbro, which moves, blinks, and makes sounds like the actual character. The toy sold out within days of its announcement, with new deliveries not expected until December 2020. Other toys announced at the Fair include a Grogu waffle iron, Chia Pets of Grogu, and a vehicle set as part of Hasbro's Mission Fleet toyline, which include the Mandalorian on a speeder bike and Grogu in his floating bassinet. Build-A-Bear Workshop has also announced it will release a version of a Grogu doll in early 2020. In August 2020, Lego released BrickHeadz figures of both Grogu and the Mandalorian, as well as a September 2020 release of a Lego set for the Mandalorian's Razor Crest spaceship, which included small figurine of Grogu, which has also appeared in the 2021 set Trouble on Tatooine (set 75299). A large, buildable figure of Grogu has also been released, as well as a plush toy based on the minifigure.

=== In video games ===
In March 2020, an unofficial user-created mod for the video game Star Wars Battlefront II allowed the character BB-8 to be replaced with a playable version of Grogu. Grogu appears in Fortnite Battle Royale as a pet that floats in the hover-pram behind the player in-game. A non-playable Grogu is included as part of The Mandalorian: Season 1 character DLC for the 2022 video game Lego Star Wars: The Skywalker Saga, accompanying Din Djarin in a floating pod that closes to protect Grogu when attacked.

=== In science ===
In 2021, Grogu's likeness was published in scientific literature, in a medical journal article titled, "Baby Yoda: Pareidolia and Patternicity in Sacral MRI and CT Scans". The lead author was Patrick Foye, M.D., a professor of physical medicine and rehabilitation at Rutgers University. In this article, he introduced a novel way of visualizing the sacrum when viewing MRI and CT scans. He noted that in certain image slices the human sacral anatomy resembles the face of "Baby Yoda". Sacral openings for exiting nerves (sacral foramina) resemble Baby Yoda's eyes, while the sacral canal resembles Baby Yoda's mouth. These and other comparisons can help physicians to use the "Baby Yoda sign" to evaluate both normal and abnormal anatomic findings on the imaging studies.

In 2022, a fossil species of proteid salamander, Euronecturus grogu, was described from the Miocene of Germany. The study's authors stated "like the new taxon herein described, Grogu is a member of an ancient lineage we know nothing or almost nothing about, which appears in an unexpected place at an unexpected time."

== Relationships ==
=== Mentorship tree ===
Jedi Order master-apprentice relationship

Yoda
Count; Dooku	Mace; Windu
Qui-Gon; Jinn	Depa; Billaba
Younglings
Obi-Wan; Kenobi	Kanan; Jarrus
Anakin; Skywalker	Luke; Skywalker	Ezra; Bridger
Ahsoka; Tano	Leia; Organa
Sabine Wren	Ben Solo (Note: Ben Solo and Rey are a Force dyad.)	Rey
Din Grogu
