= Star Fleet Warlord =

Science fiction play-by-mail game

- Publishers: Agents of Gaming (US), Pagoda Games (UK)
- Years active: 1995 to current
- Genres: Role-playing, science fiction
- Languages: English
- Systems: computer-moderated
- Players: 50
- Playing time: Fixed
- Materials required: Instructions, order sheets, turn results, paper, pencil
- Media type: Play-by-mail or email
- Website: Star Fleet Warlord, Franz Games

Star Fleet Warlord is a science fiction play-by-email (PBeM) game that occurs in the Star Trek universe. It was originally published by Agents of Gaming in the United States and licensed to Pagoda Games in the United Kingdom by 1998. This computer-moderated game is published by Franz Games as of 2023.

Gameplay shares both similarities and additions to the Star Trek universe. 50 players per game role-play warlords in an Intergalactic Corporation within the Greater Magellanic Cloud vying for supremacy using one of two possible strategies related to control of major sites. The game placed first of 77 games in Paper Mayhem's PBM game list in November 1994 and received positive reviews in multiple gaming magazines in the mid-1990s.

== Development ==
Agents of Gaming acquired a license from Task Force Games—the publisher of Star Fleet Battles—to publish Star Fleet Warlords. It is a closed-ended, computer-moderated PBM game. By 1998, Pagoda Games had licensed the game for play in the United Kingdom.

== Gameplay ==
Gameplay occurs in a universe similar to Star Trek, but from an "unusual angle and with some odd additions". (Note: John Dolan stated that "Those familiar with the Star Fleet Battles series of boardgames will notice a lot of similarities.") Game civilizations include the Federation, Gorns, Klingons, Romulans, Orions, Tholians, and others from the Star Trek series, as well as newly created ones.

Players role-play warlords in an Intergalactic Corporation within the Greater Magellanic Cloud. The Cloud comprises 100 sectors divided further into hexes (16 × 16 each).

50 players vie for supremacy within two possible strategies: local domination or infiltration of major sites. Agents of Gaming offered custom games with less players per quadrant and special rules.

== Reception ==
John A Hanna reviewed the game in the March–April 1995 issue of Flagship. He recommended it as a "mentally challenging" game. Vicky Lloyd reviewed the game in the March–April 1995 issue of Paper Mayhem', praising gamemaster management and stating, "I truly believe this game will be around for a long, long time and is destined to become a classic."

The game was ranked No. 1 of 77 games in Paper Mayhem's PBM Game Ratings as of November 1994. On a scale of 1 to 9, it scored 8.418. It was again No. 1 in Paper Mayhem's PBM game ratings as of May 1995.

== See also ==
- List of play-by-mail games

== Bibliography ==
- Allonby, Nick (March–April 1999). "Star Fleet Warlord Revisited". Flagship. No. 78. pp. 6, 8, 10.
- Barton, Andrew (March–April 1999). "Star Fleet Warlord – the Historical Game". Flagship. No. 78. pp. 4–6.
- Barton, Andrew; Dolan, John (March–April 1998). "Star Fleet Warlord". Flagship. No. 72. pp. 4–8.
- Editors (January–February 1995). "PBM Game Ratings: As of 11/18/94". Paper Mayhem. No. 71. p. 44.
- Editors (July–August 1995). "PBM Game Ratings: As of 5/11/95". Paper Mayhem. No. 73. p. 40.
- Editors (2002). "Star Fleet Warlord". Agents of Gaming.
- Hanna, John A. (March–April 1995). "Star Fleet Warlord: Strategic Campaigning in the High Arena". Flagship. No. 54 (US ed.). pp. 6–8.
- Lloyd, Vicky (March–April 1995). "Star Fleet Warlord". Paper Mayhem. No. 71. pp. 14, 16–17.
