= Samm Barnes =

Canadian writer

Sara "Samm" Barnes
- Born: Great Britain
- Occupations: Television writer; comics writer; television producer; filmmaker
- Organizations: Imaginary Voices Entertainment
- Known for: Work on Jeremiah; Marvel Comics titles; independent film Ashes to Ashes
- Notable work: Jeremiah; Doctor Spectrum: Full Spectrum; Doctor Strange: Strange Beginnings and Endings
- Awards: Joe Shuster Award for Outstanding Writer (2005)

Sara "Samm" Barnes is a television and comics writer, as well as a television producer.

== Biography ==
Though born in Great Britain to Michael and Bridget Barnes, Barnes was raised in Canada, first in Ottawa, then Toronto and finally Vancouver.

Her published comics work includes co-authoring the Doctor Strange miniseries, "Strange Beginnings and Endings" for Marvel Comics, as well The Spectacular Spider-Man. Her Doctor Spectrum miniseries, "Full Spectrum", won the Outstanding Canadian Comic Book Writer Award at the 2005 Joe Shuster Awards, held at the Paradise Comics Toronto Comicon.

Her work as a television writer includes multiple produced episodes written across two seasons of the Showtime cable TV series Jeremiah. As a co-producer of that series, she also worked in editing, mixing, prep and production. Prior to this, she worked as crew on a variety of television movies and feature films shot in and around Vancouver, British Columbia, Canada, including Cats & Dogs, The Whole Shebang, and Mission to Mars.

In 2005, she won the Joe Shuster Award for Outstanding Writer.

In 2006, she was selected as one of eight first-time filmmakers to write, direct and produce her first short film for the Crazy 8s Film Festival held in Vancouver, B.C. in June. The film is entitled "Ashes to Ashes."

In 2006, she was also a producer for Babylon 5: The Lost Tales, produced for DVD. She also produced, edited and wrote the behind-the-scenes promotional episodes that will be included on the DVD and distributed online.

In 2008, she and J. Michael Straczynski formed an independent production company, Imaginary Voices Entertainment, as equal partners to produce motion pictures and television series. They have since parted ways.
