= Babylon 5: The Lost Tales =

- DVD cover image from The Lost Tales – Voices in the Dark
- Directed by: J. Michael Straczynski
- Written by: J. Michael Straczynski
- Produced by: Sara (Samm) Barnes
- Starring: Bruce Boxleitner; Tracy Scoggins; Peter Woodward; Alan Scarfe; Bruce Ramsay; Keegan MacIntosh; Teryl Rothery
- Cinematography: Karl Herrmann
- Edited by: Stein Myhrstad
- Music by: Christopher Franke
- Production company: Warner Bros. Entertainment, Inc.
- Distributed by: Warner Home Video
- Release date: July 31, 2007
- Running time: 72 minutes (two 36 minute episodes)
- Countries: US, Canada
- Budget: US$2,000,000

Babylon 5: The Lost Tales was intended to be an anthology show set in the Babylon 5 universe. It was announced by J. Michael Straczynski, creator of Babylon 5, at San Diego Comic-Con in July 2006. Straczynski has described the stories as ideas he had for the Babylon 5 television series but never had the time to produce. Only one installment, titled Voices in the Dark, was produced before the project was shelved.

== Production ==
The project consists of one direct-to-DVD production containing two stories. On July 13, 2008, Straczynski announced he had no plans to further develop the series. Each story is built around a single established character. The production uses cast members from the original television show. The show is shot in high-definition video with digital HD cameras. The visual effects are handled by Atmosphere Visual Effects, who previously worked on other science fiction shows such as the re-imagined Battlestar Galactica and Stargate Atlantis. The music is composed by Christopher Franke, who also did the music for the original Babylon 5 series.

The show was shot in Vancouver, British Columbia, Canada. Concurrently with the DVD release, an HD version was released exclusively on the Xbox Live Video Marketplace. Douglas Netter and Straczynski executive produced the DVD.

== Concept ==
Straczynski is a fan of The Twilight Zone and the work of Rod Serling, saying of himself, "Rod is one of my icons, so believe me, I know his work far, far better than most people." The idea of doing his own science fiction anthology show is something that he has discussed in the past as a possibility and he first proposed the idea of a Tales from Babylon 5 anthology as the sixth season of the original show in 1997. He described it as, "an anthology series, to all intents and purposes, using our characters almost like a repertory group."

Straczynski has stated that Warner Brothers initially asked him if he wanted to make a Babylon 5 feature film (while most Babylon 5 related rights are held at the studio level, Straczynski owns the Babylon 5 movie rights). He declined, most importantly because he could not see the structure of a Babylon 5 movie in 2006 after both Andreas Katsulas and Richard Biggs died in the years prior, and he couldn't see himself doing something big after these deaths, though he has stated he might feel up to it "in a year or two". As an alternative to a big project, he suggested the idea of doing a bunch of character focused short films, structured in an anthology format. In addition, he asked to be guaranteed complete creative freedom in writing, which he has stated he received from the studio.

While the show was envisioned as an anthology, Straczynski stated that he would like to have thematic links in episodes on each disk:

Ideally, I'd like to rotate through the whole cast, preferably in a thematic fashion. One episode would concern itself with issues of command, and thus feature Sheridan, Lochley and Garibaldi; another would concern Psi Corps, and we'd have Lyta, Bester, and someone else; another would be a strong Minbari theme, so we'd have Delenn, Lennier and Sheridan (in his role as head of the Interstellar Alliance); a Centauri sequence with Londo, Vir and someone else; and we'd mix it up a bit.

In addition to having connections on the thematic level, the first two episodes for Voices in the Dark have stronger connections in the form of intersecting key plot and thematic points, and are intended to overlap and complement each other while telling separate but simultaneous stories.

== Voices in the Dark ==
Voices in the Dark is the title of the Lost Tales DVD that was published. On July 24, 2006, Straczynski stated they were looking at a first DVD containing three half-hour episodes, with the project and its budgets greenlit. This was later brought back to two stories, both lengthened to make up for the one lost story. These would add up to around 75–90 minutes in total of story material. He also stated that there will be additional material, adding up to a two-hour DVD. Straczynski wrote, produced, and directed them. The DVD was released on July 31, 2007, in the US and on September 3, 2007, in the United Kingdom.

Straczynski had started writing the first of the Lost Tales scripts by August 26, 2006. He stated that the exact nature of the stories is dependent on who exactly can be signed on, since original cast members are being used. In November he stated that the first three scripts were to feature the characters of John Sheridan, Elizabeth Lochley, Galen, and Michael Garibaldi. He also stated that the increasing scale and ambition of the project necessitated delaying the story featuring Garibaldi (which was the most ambitious in terms of special effects and sets) to the planned second DVD, expanding the other two stories in length.

The initial production schedule given at Comic Con for the first DVD was to start shooting in September 2006, do post-production in the fourth quarter of 2006, and release them in the second quarter of 2007. Due to certain members of crew and others not being available, this schedule got pushed back, first to October, and then to November. Production began on November 13, 2006. The DVD had been fully delivered to the studio by 2007-04-15.

Straczynski's role as director of this initial batch of two episodes comes after only having directed the Babylon 5 series finale "Sleeping in Light" before. He stated that, with new tools available and more room for experimentation in television directing now, six years after Babylon 5, he wanted to slightly redesign how Babylon 5 is shot. "... nothing major, just the feeling of the shots and the CGI and to set a tone for the films." After the tone had been set, he intends others to take over for future installments.

While the look of Babylon 5 is rethought for Voices in the Dark, there are things in the feel of the show that are to be the same, like the silhouettes and designs. To do this for the CGI, Atmosphere Visual Effects had to make use of fan created 3D models. The art assets of the original show were turned over to Warner Bros to be archived, with the studio mandating that no back ups be made, a request that was honored. The archives ended up being lost however, which required the use of fan-created materials for reference.

=== Plot outline ===
Voices in the Dark is set in 2271. It features two linked plotlines viewed separately one after the other but covering the same 72-hour timespan.

==== Voices in the Dark: Over Here ====
The first part called Voices in the Dark: Over Here features Colonel (formerly Captain during the series' run) Lochley on Babylon 5 awaiting Sheridan's arrival, who summons a priest from Earth (Father Cassidy) to help deal with a mysterious, seemingly supernatural problem. A maintenance crew member, Simon Burke, returns to Babylon 5 from a vacation on Earth and begins behaving erratically. Along with temperature changes in his part of the station, there is a foul odor. Burke (under control of something) claims that God "salted" this region of space with fallen angels to keep man in check. Father Cassidy struggles with deciding whether to perform the exorcism or bring in more clergy. Lockley investigates Burke and exposes his lie, confronting him that "Hell" is Earth and that his kind are bound to Earth so he attempted to "hitchhike" in Burke's body. She has him sedated and tells him she will have him "exorcised" on Earth where he will be trapped until the sun goes supernova. The sedatives knock him out after he says "We will remember you."

==== Voices in the Dark: Over There ====
The second part, Voices in the Dark: Over There, follows ISA President John Sheridan on his way to B5 for a celebration of the 10th anniversary of the formation of the Interstellar Alliance. During the journey he picks up the Centauri Prince Dius Vintari (third in line to the Centauri Imperial throne) on the edge of Centauri space, using a new Valen-class cruiser, and receives a warning from Galen the techno-mage about Earth's destruction in 30 years by Vintari's hand to restore the Centauri Republic to glory. Galen proposes killing Vintari in a Starfury weapons malfunction. Sheridan goes along with it until he realizes there were "ways" to prevent that future. Sheridan chooses instead to have Vintari live on Minbar where he can be taught compassion. Galen confronts Sheridan about his decision, but Sheridan forces Galen to all but admit that was his actual goal to maneuver him into that choice. The story introduces the concept of quantum space.

=== Cast ===
- Bruce Boxleitner as President John Sheridan
- Tracy Scoggins as Colonel Elizabeth Lochley
- Peter Woodward as Galen
- Alan Scarfe as Father Cassidy
- Bruce Ramsay as Simon Burke
- Teryl Rothery as ISN reporter Ms. Chambers
- Keegan Macintosh as Prince Vintari
- Craig Veroni as Guard

=== Extras ===
The Voices in the Dark DVD contains a certain number of extras, including behind-the-scenes pieces. There also was supposed to be "a number of original short pieces" to be shot in February 2007. There were six "promosodes" written, featuring, among other characters, Lennier. According to Lost Tales producer Samm Barnes, they couldn't be pulled together for this disc, but they can later pull from these unfilmed stories.

During the production of Voices in the Dark a series of behind-the-scenes video blogs were produced. Some of these were intended to be shown at conventions, specifically the New York Comic Con and Comic-Con International conventions of 2007, some were released via the Internet, and some were released on the DVD. Straczynski has compared them to Peter Jackson's production diaries for King Kong or Bryan Singer's video blogs for Superman Returns.

A mini-comic was included with the DVD when purchased at Best Buy, showing the adventures of G'Kar and Stephen Franklin beyond the Rim.

== Future installments ==
Straczynski initially stated that predicated on the success of Voices in the Dark a second installment could be released in early 2008 "at the earliest". Peter Jurasik had stated that he was contacted by Straczynski to reprise his role as Londo Mollari for a set of alien-centric stories after the initial batch centered on humans. He stated that he said yes to him: "if you [Straczynski] wrote it, I'd do it". The second installment was also set to include a story centered on the character Michael Garibaldi, initially planned for the first installment. In September 2007, Straczynski stated that his preferences for a possible second disc were to definitely tell a Garibaldi-centric story, and probably a Londo-centric one.

One of the big events in the Babylon 5 universe that The Lost Tales was set to explore eventually was the Telepath War. Straczynski reportedly stated at the New York Comic Con in February 2007 that he already had a concept for a possible direct-to-DVD Telepath War story in mind.

Any future installments were on hold due to the WGA Strike, 2007. Prior to the strike, Straczynski urged Warner Brothers to commission a new DVD as they were suitably impressed with the sales for the first DVD. However, Warner Bros. felt that the Writer's Guild would not go on strike and refused to speed up the bureaucratic process; in their words, "We don't want to be pressured in the process because we know there's not going to be a strike this year, we can handle the Guild". At the Emerald City Comic Convention in May 2008, after the strike, Straczynski briefly updated fans on the prospects for more releases. He noted that two divisions of Warner Bros. seemed to be "discussing" wanting a feature film or more Lost Tales but had come to an agreement and hadn't gotten to the point of guaranteeing Straczynski total creative control in the case of a feature film. The budget for the first disc was two million dollars.

On July 13, 2008, Straczynski revealed that he had no plans to continue The Lost Tales. He said that although the studio was interested in another disc, they wanted to budget the next installment similarly to the first. Citing his disappointment with the first release due to the low budget, Straczynski said he did not want to dilute Babylon 5's legacy with further sub-par stories. He stated that he would only return to the Babylon 5 universe if Warner Bros. wanted to do a large-budgeted cinema release.

Years later, in 2023, Straczynski and WB again partnered to produce a direct-to-video Babylon 5 animated movie, The Road Home.
