= Atmosphere Visual Effects =

Canadian visual effects company

- Industry: Visual effects
- Founded: Vancouver, British Columbia, Canada (2003)
- Headquarters: 200-1669 West 3rd Avenue, Vancouver, British Columbia, Canada
- Key people: Tom Archer, Jeremy Hoey, Andrew Karr
- Number of employees: 15
- Website: atmosphere-vfx.com

Atmosphere Visual Effects is a Canadian visual effects company. It was founded in Vancouver in 2003 by Andrew Karr, Tom Archer, and Jeremy Hoey, ex-employees of Vancouver-based visual effects company GVFX, after said company folded in that year. They have worked on a number of science fiction shows, including the reimagined Battlestar Galactica, Stargate Atlantis, The 4400, Andromeda, and Babylon 5: The Lost Tales.

Their work on the new Battlestar Galactica has been nominated for several awards. Their work on the episode "The Hand of God" was nominated for an Emmy in 2005. They have been nominated for two Visual Effects Society awards in 2006, for the episodes "Exodus" and "Downloaded".

== Credits ==
Feature films

- The Thaw (Brightlight Pictures)
- Edison & Leo (Infinity Features Entertainment)
- Snow Buddies (Disney)
- Wrong Turn II
- Air Buddies (Disney)
- Chestnut: Hero of Central Park (New Line Cinema)
- Drop Dead Sexy (Arrival Pictures)
- Desolation Sound (Sleepwalker Films)

Broadcast series

- Battlestar Galactica, Seasons 1-3 (NBC Universal)
- Stargate Atlantis, Seasons 1-5 (MGM Television)
- The 4400, Seasons 2-4 (USA Network)
- Stargate SG-1, Seasons 8-10 (MGM Television)
- Dead Like Me, Seasons 1-2 (MGM Television)
- Kingdom Hospital, Season 1 (ABC)
- Andromeda, Season 4 (Sci Fi Channel)
- Family Guy, Season 8-10 "Brian Griffin's House of Payne", "Back to the Pilot"
- Primeval: New World (Impossible Pictures)

MOWs, Miniseries, Pilots

- Virtuality, Pilot (NBC Universal)
- Resistance, Pilot
- Babylon 5: The Lost Tales (Warner Bros.)
- Nobody, Pilot (Fox Television)
- Last Days of Planet Earth (Hallmark)
- Bloodsuckers (Echo Bridge)
- Colt (Hallmark)

== Awards and nominations ==
2016

- Leo Awards: Nominated: Best Visual Effects in a Dramatic Series (Bitten Episode 301 "Family, Of Sorts")

2013

- Leo Awards: Nominated: Best Visual Effects in a Dramatic Series (Primeval: New World Episode 113 "Sound of Thunder Part 2")

2011

- Visual Effects Society (VES) Awards: Nominated: Outstanding Models & Miniatures in a Broadcast Program or Commercial (Family Guy Episode "Brian Griffin's House of Payne")

2010

- Gemini Awards: Nominated: Outstanding Visual Effects in a Broadcast Series (Stargate: Universe Episode 102 "Air")
- Visual Effects Society (VES) Awards: Nominated: Outstanding Visual Effects in a Broadcast Series (Stargate: Universe Episode 102 "Air")
- Primetime Emmy Awards: Nominated: Outstanding Special Visual Effects in a Broadcast Series (Virtuality)
- Primetime Emmy Awards: Nominated: Outstanding Special Visual Effects in a Broadcast Series (Stargate: Universe Episode 102 "Air")
- Leo Awards: Nominated: Best Visual Effects in a Feature Length Drama (The Thaw)

2009

- Gemini Awards: Nominated: Outstanding Visual Effects in a Broadcast Series (Stargate Atlantis Episode 510 "First Contact")
- Gemini Awards: Nominated: Outstanding Visual Effects in a Broadcast Series (Stargate Atlantis Episode 520 "Enemy At The Gate")

2008

- Primetime Emmy Awards: Nominated: Outstanding Special Visual Effects in a Broadcast Series (Stargate: Atlantis Episode 401 "Adrift")
- Gemini Awards: Nominated: Outstanding Visual Effects in a Broadcast Series (Stargate: Atlantis Episode 411 "Be All My Sins Remember'd")

2007

- Primetime Emmy Awards: WON: Outstanding Special Visual Effects in a Broadcast Series (Battlestar Galactica Episode 303 "Exodus")
- Visual Effects Society Awards: WON: Best Visual Effects in a Broadcast Series (Battlestar Galactica Episode 303 "Exodus")
- Visual Effects Society Awards: Nominated: Best Animated Character in a Television Series (Cylon Centurions, Battlestar Galactica Episode 217 "Downloaded")
- Gemini Award: WON: Outstanding Visual Effects in a Broadcast Series (Stargate: Atlantis Episode 302 "No Man's Land")

2006

- Primetime Emmy Awards: Nominated: Outstanding Special Visual Effects in a Broadcast Series (Battlestar Galactica Episode 211 "Resurrection Ship Part 1")
- Visual Effects Society Awards: WON: Best Animated Character in a Television Series (Cylon Centurions, Battlestar Galactica Episode 303 "Fragged")

2005

- Primetime Emmy Awards: Nominated: Outstanding Special Visual Effects in a Broadcast Series (Battlestar Galactica Episode 110 "Hand of God")

2004

- Primetime Emmy Awards: Nominated: Outstanding Special Visual Effects in a Broadcast Series (Kingdom Hospital Pilot Episode)
