= Babylon 5: A Call to Arms (game) =

Tabletop game

Babylon 5 Space Combat
- Manufacturers: Mongoose Publishing
- Designers: Matt Sprange and others
- Publishers: Mongoose Publishing
- Years active: 2004 to 2009
- Players: 2+
- Setup time: 5 - 30 minutes
- Playing time: 15 minutes - 5 hours
- Chance: Dice rolling
- Age range: 12+
- Skills: Strategy, Arithmetic

Babylon 5: A Call to Arms (ACtA) is a tabletop miniatures boardgame released in September 2004 by Mongoose Publishing, designed initially as an expansion to their Babylon 5: The Roleplaying Game, it is a complete game in its own right. Babylon 5: A Call to Arms is based upon the sci-fi television series Babylon 5 and draws heavily on material from the television show and the boardgame Babylon 5 Wars. The game's popularity exceeded Mongoose Publishing's initial expectations and has expanded to include new rules supplements and new miniatures; a second edition of the game was released in August 2007. Mongoose Publishing announced on their website in February 2008 that all production of miniatures for the line would cease as of March 2008. Mongoose have indicated they will continue to support the game however through supplements and articles in their in-house magazine Signs and Portents.

== History ==
Since its initial release in 2004, A Call to Arms has gone through several significant changes, with the release of supporting material and supplements. Initially the main boxed set contained the basic rules set and fleet lists for the Earth Alliance, Minbari, Centauri, Narn, Interstellar Alliance, Shadows, Vorlons, Raiders and League of Non-Aligned Worlds, as well as cardboard counters that could be used in place of miniatures to represent the ships. Some of these lists were extremely limited in options but most ships from the show were represented, including the iconic White Star but not the Babylon 5 space station.

With the help of feedback from players there were three Rules Supplements released in the following year, each providing a range of new units, rules and points of discussion. Rules Supplement 1 concentrated on new fighter rules, new missions, addressing several FAQ and finally releasing rules for space stations and Babylon 5 itself. Rules Supplement 2 included rules for fleet carriers and revised fleet lists for the Vorlons and the Shadows. Rules Supplement 3 included an expanded set of fleet lists for the League of Non-Aligned Worlds and new Refits and Duties tables for campaign play.

This was all part of the ongoing design and development process for what was essentially still a new game and Mongoose Publishing decided to publish in September 2005 a more comprehensive update for the game in the form of the book Sky Full of Stars (SFoS). This supplement not only pulled together all of the threads from the Rules Supplements but added more detail to certain sections of rules (particularly the campaign rules) and completely overhauled every fleet list. SFoS was a large expansion for the game both in terms of rules and in terms of the miniatures available. Soon after this there was a revised edition of the main boxed set to reflect any rules changes (although not the updated fleet lists).

Over the next year there were numerous articles in Mongoose's Signs & Portents magazine, and smaller supplements to cover the Earth-Minbari War, fleets for the Dilgar and Drakh. October 2006 saw the next significant release for the game with the hardback supplement Armageddon released. This supplement provided further rules updates, new ships for many races and new fleet lists for three different Earth Alliance eras, the Shadows, the Vorlons and the Ancients. This supplement has been the most controversial, with issues including the introduction of a new (Armageddon) priority level and Mongoose's problems with moulds for many ships collapsing.

Since then, there has been the release of the pak'ma'ra fleet followed by the release of the 2nd edition of the Call to Arms games in Aug 2007. This edition introduced new playable fleet list including the Gaim and Psi Corp as well as additional individual ships such as the Hurr Gunship, Technomage Pinnace and the Ipsha Warglobe.

In Feb 2008 Mongoose Publishing announced on their website that;

After a very successful number of years producing miniatures for our Origins award-winning game A Call to Arms, Mongoose Publishing is announcing today that we will cease production of this range of models with effect from March 31st 2008. The increasing costs associated with this range combined with its sheer breadth means that production of miniatures is no longer commercially viable at this time. As a result we have reduced our prices on the miniatures by 20%, which will continue until March 31st 2008, when they will be removed from our catalogue. So, if you have been thinking about that new Shadow fleet or want to bolster the defences of the ISA, now is the time! We will still continue to support A Call to Arms through Signs & Portents and book releases.

The announcement came as a surprise to members of the Mongoose forums given the relatively active release schedule for new models and the short time after the release of the 2nd edition of the game. Speculation that the decision to cease miniature production was prompted by problems in extending the necessary license from Warner Bros to produce B5 miniatures was dismissed as false by Matthew Sprange, co-founder of Mongoose Publishing.

Mongoose Publishing purchased the license from Warner Bros following the demise of Agents of Gaming in November 2002 who had previous held said license to market and sell the Babylon 5 Wars game using many of the ship models as the current A Call to Arms line.

Mongoose Publishing later announced that on June 30, 2009, they would no longer be selling any more Babylon 5 licensed products, as they chose to not renew the license.

== The tabletop game ==
=== Overview ===
ACtA has two or more players bringing a fleet ships consisting of miniatures or counters and fighting out a battle using dice, rules and tactics. Each player has a certain number of Fleet Allocation Points (FAP) to spend on choices from one of many race-specific fleet lists. All ships are allocated a Priority Level that determines its value and these are (in ascending order): Patrol; Skirmish; Raid; Battle; War; Armageddon. Once a size of battle and the number of FAP to spend (and scenario) are chosen, each player selects his ships, splitting or combining the FAP to produce the desired fleet. The most common size of game is Raid Priority Level with 5 FAP to spend.

Play is divided into turns where each player gets to perform actions with each of his ships and using dice to determine the outcomes of these actions. In each turn there is a Movement Phase, Attack Phase and an End Phase. Each phase has a defined set of rules that limit the options available to each player and the stats in the fleet lists determine the abilities of the individual units.

Rather than a traditional alternating sequence of play (where a player makes actions with every unit before his opponent goes), each player gets to make one action with a ship before his opponent makes an action, and so on. There is a wide variety of scenarios to play and each presents a different set of challenges to the player.

Victory is determined by the scenario-specific Victory Conditions and may range more commonly from the highest scorer of Victory Points to completing a specific mission objective.

=== Miniatures ===
A Call to Arms is a miniatures game and as such every unit may be represented by a miniature, although they may also be represented by a counter. Collecting and painting (and modeling) are integral parts of the game and a player may spend considerable time on this aspect of the hobby alone. There are a wide variety of fleet boxed sets that offer a mixture of ships for one race, along with a full range of ships that may be bought individually. This allows players to assemble a fleet that suits their preferences, whether they be aesthetic or tactical.

== Races ==
There are a wide variety of races available to play, all with differing styles and looks. Currently these are:

- Earth Alliance (Early Years)
- Earth Alliance (Dawn of the Third Age)
- Earth Alliance (Crusade)
- Minbari
- Centauri
- Narn
- Interstellar Alliance
- Vorlons
- Shadows
- Abbai
- Brakiri
- Drazi
- Gaim
- pak'ma'ra
- Vree
- Raiders
- Dilgar
- Drakh
- Ancients
- Psi-Corps

=== Earth Alliance (Early Years) ===
The Earth Alliance was formed in 2075 following the formation of their first offworld colony and eventually led to the formation of a global (and interstellar) unifying government. As the Earth Alliance expanded and came into contact with more extraterrestrial races, there was an increasingly pressing need to build a navy for the protection of the Earth Alliance's sovereign interests. Early conflicts with the Koulani and Ch'Lonas set up an atmosphere of confidence and when the Dilgar came onto the galactic stage as a threat to many nations, the Earth Alliance decided that it was time to flex their muscle on a greater stage and used the Dilgar War as a means to announce their presence to the other major nations. After a successful conflict from 2230 to 2232, the Earth Alliance became increasingly belligerent and when confronted with the Minbari suffered their greatest defeat and came within one battle of being completely annihilated.

Earth Alliance ships from this era are solid and rely heavily on plasma and pulse weaponry. Railguns and missiles are also seen but beam weaponry only really came in during the Earth-Minbari war when the Narns sold Centauri beam technology in an attempt to make money and implicate the Centauri during a conflict they wanted to otherwise stay out of. Earth Alliance ships are generally slow and cumbersome with solid defences, including innovative interceptor grids, and one of the best dogfighters in the galaxy - no mean feat for one of the newest major races. The Aurora Starfury is an unusual design and succeeds in being one of the premier fighters, coming second only to Minbari designs. An unsubtle fleet but one full of power and no lack of impetus to defeat even the most determined of foes.

=== Minbari ===
A Minbari Sharlin Warcruiser

The Minbari are the oldest of the 'young' ones and it was not until after the second Shadow War that any of the other younger races could match their ships. They were a mysterious race to all but the Vorlons - who were their mentors. And it is not until they started to form the Army of Light that they revealed themselves to talk and help other races, instead of unleashing their rage as they had done so before. Even after this there were still numerous secrets and mysteries surrounding them, some of which even most Minbari did not know of. A re-occurring theme of the Minbari species is the idea of '3' and its multiples. They have three castes, several religious artifacts are triangular and the Grey Council - the leading body of the Minbari consists of nine Minbari; three from each caste. The caste system usually works well, and is the main reason for the Minbari being so advanced. However, there was once a war between castes which nearly cost the Minbari as a race dearly.

The Minbari are a very advanced race who have developed complex engines for their ships. Most of their weapons are beam weapons which can literally cut hulls cleanly and easily into two. However, it is their defense system which makes them so hard to defeat. All their ships, and even their fighters, have complex stealth systems which simply stop the enemy from targeting their ships. This is why the Minbari have lower hull scores than most - as there is rarely a weapon aimed at them that actually hits; but this does mean that if the enemy finds a way of penetrating the stealth they will find the Minbari ships easier to destroy than they might expect, but this is easier said than done and the Minbari will normally have killed several of the other fleet before this happens.

=== Centauri ===
The Centauri were known as the Lion of the Galaxy and for good reason. The great Centauri Republic was an empire to be feared and respected by all but the oldest of races. A Roman style senate leads the Centauri people and is directed by the Emperor. This system of government oversaw a vast galactic empire that the Centauri carved out for themselves over centuries. Although not fully gone, the Centauri Republic at the time of Babylon 5 was a shadow of its former glory. Many saw the beginning of the decline as the Centauri withdrawal from the Narn occupation of the 22nd Century. From this point many smaller nations including the Narn and Drazi have claimed former regions of Centauri territory and due to political infighting and disunity there has been no concerted effort to reclaim these lost territories. With the arrival of the Shadows the Centauri Republic once again made a bid for expansion that ultimately collapsed as enemies of the Shadows united against the Ancients and drove them out of the galaxy.

Centauri war doctrine follows similar martial codes to the fights demanded by their system of family honour. Despite highly advanced beam technology, the Centauri make extensive use of the more explosive ion cannon and matter cannon technologies. These weapons sacrifice range for destructive power and many Centauri hunt in packs of lightly armoured but heavily armed ships, aiming to swarm larger enemy vessels before they can pick off the Centauri targets. The larger Centauri capital ships such as the Primus are dissimilar to the larger ships of other races in that they tend to provide support for their packs of smaller vessels rather than be equipped to directly take on the lead enemy ships.

=== Narn ===
The Narn are an aggressive, expansionist race with strict codes of personal honour and fervent religious beliefs. The Narn were historically an agrarian society with little or no interest in the universe around them and lacked the technology to travel beyond their own planet. This changed with the Centauri invasion early in the 22nd Century followed by 100 years of oppression and slavery until finally the Centauri wearied of Narn resistance and withdrew. This left a bitter enmity of the Centauri and led to the Narns rapidly carving out an empire for themselves, initially using scavenged ships but later integrating the fruits of their numerous dealings with other worlds. Governed by the Kha'Ri, this strategy of background dealings served them well until the Centauri backed by the mysterious Shadows invaded them for a second time in 2259. Eventually breaking free from this occupation the Narn emerged weakened but keen to retake their rightful place in the galaxy and were one of the founding members of the Interstellar Alliance

Narn fleets are built around brute force, being powerful yet unsubtle. A favoured tactic is the long-ranged bombardment of an enemy with energy mines before closing with their beams and arrays of lighter weapons. Narn ships are built solidly, with few active defences, relying instead on weathering the punishment inflicted on them directly. This leads to Narn tactics of long-ranged beam and energy mine salvoes followed by pushing into the centre of an enemy position if possible. Poor speed and manoeuvrability of Narn ships often prevents this and many enemies attempt to stay out of range of the multiple Narn secondary weapons. The lighter Narn ships excel at bringing large amounts of firepower to bear on targets and any ship targeted by a Narn fleet rarely survives for very long.

=== Abbai ===
The Abbai are a semi-aquatic race with a matriarchal and deeply pacifist society. The Abbai themselves are amphibious and build much of their planet's infrastructure at least partially submerged underwater. They are fully capable of acting normally on dry land and in space too, being as physically resilient as most other species. Their history of peaceful coexistence has allowed them to develop their technology to advanced levels without the disruptions war brings about. This has also led to their adopting an approach of diplomacy over open warfare and are a stabilising influence over the League of Non-Aligned Worlds and later the Interstellar Alliance.

Their fleets reflect their society and Abbai ships are as a result almost impregnably tough due to their advanced armour, shielding and particle impeders but lack the heavy weaponry other fleets possess. Although less manoeuvrable than other races' ships, Abbai ships have weapons with great coverage so are rarely outflanked and work best in a close fight where the enemy has to face guns in every direction. Lacking the support of a good fighter or heavy firepower, the Abbai often form a coordinated fleet with other races in the League of Non-Aligned Worlds. With the advent of the Drakh War the Abbai declared a holy war on the Drakh and unleashed the distinctly un-Abbai Juyaca Dreadnought - a ship with the sole intention of destruction of enemy fleets and ending the Drakh threat.

=== Raiders ===
Raider is the name given to many groups of pirates, bounty hunters and smugglers of varying nationality. Most Raider groups consist of just a few dozen fighters and their pilots, occasionally with a small supply ship to back them up. However, some bands gain sufficient wealth and notoriety so as to purchase a large mothership and many fighters and attract larger numbers of pilots to help. Sometimes with their purchasing information such as shipping routes and being a large enough force, they can even cause significant threats to the local governments and military. Many of these groups don't survive long as there is no real system of trust or fellowship but this doesn't stop them inflicting significant harm on trade routes. The largest groups may even receive indirect support from League governments interested in disrupting local, rival nations.

Most Raider fleets consist of large numbers of fighters, backed up by a few larger support ships. Most of their ships are undergunned and slow but can prove surprisingly durable. Given their commitments and limited resources, most Raider fleets succeed best when they hit suddenly, using their faster fighters, then retreat quickly before attrition cripples their expensive motherships. This tactic works well with smaller engagements although due to a lack of warships, Raider commanders would do well to avoid larger conflicts.

=== Drakh ===
The Drakh are a secretive race and were dedicated servants of the Shadows until they left the galaxy in 2261. After this time, they took it upon themselves to continue the Shadows' work and to take revenge upon those whom they saw as responsible for forcing the Shadows away. Their plans were on two main levels, one an underground campaign of infiltration on Centauri Prime and the other, a more open war on the Earth Alliance and the Interstellar Alliance. They attempted to unleash a Shadow Planet Killer on Earth itself but were foiled at the last moment (see Babylon 5: A Call to Arms (movie) and instead unleashed a deadly Shadow tech plague. Their legacy continues and their secretive nature makes them a very difficult opponent to defeat.

Drakh ships are based upon Shadow technology and are highly advanced. Their hulls may not be as tough physically as those of other races' ships but this is more than compensated for by a combination of high-powered gravitic energy grids and nimble Raiders. Their ships carry deadly beam weaponry that causes great damage but generally lack the range of other fleets. However, their strength lies in numbers and it is a common sight to see Drakh carriers unloading hordes of Raiders to swarm and overwhelm their enemy. Individually these ships may be weak, but in packs a wise enemy must scatter the Drakh forces before they can form up and present an impenetrable wedge of ships.

== Reception ==
ACtA won a Gamers' Choice award at Origins Awards 2004.

== Reviews ==
- Syfy
