= Babylon 5 Wars =

Science fiction tabletop game

- Designers: Robert N. Glass, Bruce H. Graw
- Publishers: Agents of Gaming
- Players: 2 or more
- Setup time: 5 - 10 minutes
- Playing time: 1 to 4 hours
- Chance: Dice rolling
- Age range: 10+
- Skills: Strategy, Tactics, Arithmetic

Babylon 5 Wars (B5W) is a science fiction tabletop miniature wargame produced by the gaming company Agents of Gaming. Play centers on miniature figurines based the TV show Babylon 5. It was nominated in 1999 for the Origins Award for Best Science Fiction or Fantasy Miniatures Rules. The same year, the Babylon 5 Wars miniature of the Babylon 5 station won the Origins Award for Best Vehicle Miniature.

== History ==
Bruce Graw and Robert Glass designed the first edition of Babylon 5 Wars, and Agents of Gaming published it in 1997. The original rules were complex and the ship selection was minimal. The second edition was produced less than one year later including several key rules revisions and clarifications. It was published in April 1999.) Over the lifespan of the game many supplements were released covering new races and ships.

Due to the cancellation of Babylon 5 Agents of Gaming chose not to renew its contract. Mongoose Publishing picked up the Babylon 5 license and published A Call to Arms from 2004 to 2008.

== Canon ==
J. Michael Straczynski allegedly considers the Babylon 5 Wars material published by Agents of Gaming to be canon due to close cooperation between the creators of the game and the show.

== Babylon 5 Wars, the Game ==
=== Overview ===
Each player assembles a fleet, represented by counters or miniatures, which equal to a set point limit. A player is generally limited to a single race to choose his ships. There is also a limit to ship usage based on fighter space, rarity, and year.

The game is broken down into turns. Each player interacts in a turn at the same time. A die roll with certain bonuses determines movement order. Actions such as drift, power usage, electronic warfare, thrust, and fighter operations must be taken every turn. A turn can be very long and complex. Some turns can take up to hours depending on fleet sizes.

Historic scenarios can also be played out based on supplements and rules expansions. A scenario spells out specific fleet compositions for each player along with map geography and objectives.

=== Models ===
The cost of a fighting force is relatively cheap compared to other games in the tabletop miniature wargame genre. Agents of Gaming created associated minis for the majority of published ships, but the company had a chronic problem finding a reliable sculptor. Sometimes throughout the life of the game no miniatures would be released for months at a time.

All ship models were released in pewter. Some ships were very large, taking up several base stands on the playing map.

The only current first-hand source for B5W miniatures is the Agents of Gaming Shopify webstore.

=== Armies/Races/Species ===
This is a list of playable races (including one-off "Ships of the Month").

- Abbai Matriarchate
- Alacan Republic
- Balosian Underdwellers
- The Belt Alliance
- Brakiri Syndicracy
- Cascor Commonwealth
- Centauri Republic
- Ch'Lonas
- Corillani Theocracy
- Deneth Assembly
- Descari Committees
- Dilgar Imperium
- Drazi Freehold
- Earth Alliance
- Gaim Intelligence
- Grome Autocracy
- Hurr Republic
- Hyach Gerontocracy
- Ipsha Baronies
- Kirishiac Lords
- Kor-Lyan Kingdoms
- Koulani
- Llort Scavengers
- Markab Theocracy
- Minbari Federation
- Mindriders
- Narn Regime
- Orieni Empire
- Pak'ma'ra
- Raiders
- Rogolon Dynasty
- Shadows
- Sorithian Commune
- Streib
- Technomages
- Torata Regency
- Torvalus Speculators
- Triad
- Usuuth Coalition
- Vorlon Empire
- Vree Conglomerate
- Yolu Theocracy

== Reviews ==
- Backstab #5
