= Jeanne Cavelos =

American novelist

- Born: May 26, 1960 (age 66); Summit, New Jersey, U.S.
- Education: Michigan State University (BS); American University (MFA)
- Occupations: Writer; editor; former NASA astrophysicist
- Writing career
- Genre: Science fiction
- Website: www.jeannecavelos.com

Jeanne Cavelos (born May 26, 1960) is an American science fiction writer, editor, and former NASA astrophysicist. She is the founder and a main director of the Odyssey Writing Workshop. She is the author of The Science of Star Wars and is the first person documented saying "May the 4th Be with You," which has led to the creation of "Star Wars Day" on May 4.

== Early life and scientific career ==
Cavelos began writing science fiction as a child, but wanted to do something that she felt was more important. Inspired by Charlton Heston in Planet of the Apes, Cavelos decided to study astrophysics with the goal of becoming an astronaut. She went on to receive her BS in astronomy from Michigan State University in 1982.

Cavelos first worked as an astrophysicist and mathematician. She taught astronomy at Michigan State University and Cornell University and worked at the Astronaut Training Museum at NASA's Johnson Space Center.

However, she became dissatisfied with working in astronomy. She realized that she liked thinking about big questions, like the creation of the universe, rather than the smaller issues she had to focus on in research or at NASA. Science-fiction also gave her the ability to have freedom to explore ideas and consequences. This love led to her decision to attend American University to earn her MFA in Creative Writing.

== Editing and writing careers ==
Cavelos transitioned into the publishing field, working as a senior editor for Bantam Doubleday Dell. While working there, she launched the Abyss imprint, of horror, and Cutting Edge imprint, of noir literary fiction. She also ran the science fiction/fantasy publishing program and edited a wide range of fiction and nonfiction. As an editor, she became known for discovering and nurturing new authors, and won a World Fantasy Award. She worked with authors including William F. Nolan, Joan Vinge, Robert Anton Wilson, Dennis Etchison, Tanith Lee, Kathe Koja, Poppy Z. Brite, J. M. Dillard, David Wingrove, Barry Gifford, Patrick McCabe, and Peter Dickinson.

While working at Dell, Cavelos contacted J. Michael Straczynski to discuss the novelizations of Babylon 5. She began the novel line with Dell before leaving publishing to focus on her writing career in 1994. After receiving a form letter with an idea for the book, she set aside the novel that she had been writing and wrote a proposal for the Babylon 5 book, which led to The Shadow Within.

Cavelos then wrote the non-fiction books The Science of the X-files, followed by The Science of Star Wars. In The Science of Star Wars, she possibly coined the phrase "May the 4th Be with You," which has led to the creation of "Star Wars Day" on May 4.

Cavelos went on to author the Babylon 5 Passing of the Techno-Mages trilogy.

In 2004 Cavelos edited The Many Faces of Van Helsing, an anthology of horror and fantasy stories about Abraham Van Helsing written by masters of the genres. The anthology was nominated for a Bram Stoker Award.

Cavelos has continued to teach, shifting her focus from astronomy and mathematics to creative writing. In 1994, she began teaching advanced fiction writing at Saint Anselm College. In 1996, Cavelos and founded Odyssey Writing Workshops Charitable Trust, a nonprofit that helps fiction writers improve their work. In 2015, Cavelos was nominated for a World Fantasy Award for her work as Odyssey director and instructor. In 2024, Cavelos won a Locus Award for "Fostering Excellence in Craft & Career".

== Bibliography ==
- Babylon 5: The Passing of the Techno-Mages – Casting Shadows
- Babylon 5: The Passing of the Techno-Mages – Summoning Light
- Babylon 5: The Passing of the Techno-Mages – Invoking Darkness
- Babylon 5: The Shadow Within
- The Science of Star Wars (book)
- The Science of the X-files
- The Many Faces of Van Helsing
