= Agents of Gaming =

Game design studio

Agents of Gaming was a game design studio that started out in January 1992 by Bruce Graw. The company's original purpose was to run Galactic Conquest, the play-by-mail game which became Star Fleet Warlord. Galactic Conquest had originally been run as a hobby (first created in late 1989), but proved its worth in the first eight games as a legitimate play-by-mail game. The public debut came at Gen Con/Origins 1992, followed shortly by a deal to make it an official Star Fleet Universe product (a change of the name to the Star Fleet Warlord).

Continental Conquest (then called Conquest of America) was written in 1992 and also started its first game at Gen Con/Origins. The European map was added in mid-1993 and the revision to the current rules (including the Oceania map) was completed in mid-1995.

The concept for Babylon 5 Wars was created by Robert Glass in April 1996 and pitched to Agents of Gaming, and was nearly dismissed as an impossible prospect. Robert persisted, calling Warner Brothers, and was able to secure the license with the help of Agents of Gaming credentials. Kelly Lofgren was brought on board shortly thereafter. The basic game system took nearly a year to write, refine and playtest before it was finished in April 1997.

They also created several tabletop wargaming products before their closing on November 1, 2002. It collapsed shortly after Warner Brothers pulled their Babylon 5 license, citing concerns that the license was not being grown.

Their notable games include:

- Babylon 5 Wars (Origins Award nominee)
- Babylon 5: Fleet Action

== See also ==
- List of play-by-mail games
