= Jungle Scout =

Company providing tools for e-commerce businesses

- Industry: E-commerce, software services
- Founded: February 2015
- Founder: Greg Mercer
- Headquarters: Texas
- Number of employees: 200
- Parent: JS Operating Company
- Website: junglescout.com

Jungle Scout is an American company providing SaaS-based tools for search and market analytics, inventory management, and sales intelligence for companies selling in online marketplaces.

== Overview ==
Jungle Scout was started in 2015 by Greg Mercer. The company initially sold search optimizing tools to sellers solely on Amazon. Jungle Scout advertises management of e-commerce businesses. The company was recognized as the "Best Startup Employers" in 2021 by Forbes magazine.

The company established its headquarters in Austin, Texas in 2018 and has offices in Vancouver, British Columbia, and Shenzhen, China.

== Acquisition ==
Jungle Scout acquired "Forecastly", a predictive analytics and demand forecasting tool for Amazon sellers, in 2018. In March 2021, Jungle Scout raised $110 million in growth capital led by Summit Partners, part of which was used to acquire Seattle-based Downstream Impact, a company specializing in Amazon advertising technology.

== Leadership change ==
On May 8, 2024, Jungle Scout announced the appointment of Jay Lovelace, formerly President and Chief Commercial Officer of data analytics firm SPINS, as the company's new Chief Executive Officer, succeeding founder Greg Mercer, who transitioned to a strategic role on the company's board of directors. At the time of his departure, Mercer said the company had grown to a team of more than 150 people serving over one million customers.

== Downstream Impact acquisition ==
As part of its March 2021 funding round, Jungle Scout acquired Downstream Impact, a Seattle-based company specializing in Amazon advertising technology that managed more than $250 million a year in Amazon advertising spend for brands including HP and Bic.
