= Babylon 5 Roleplaying Game =

Tabletop role-playing game

- Cover
- Publishers: Mongoose Publishing
- Publication: 2003
- Genres: Role-playing game

The Babylon 5 Roleplaying Game is a role-playing game published by Mongoose Publishing in 2003.

== Description ==
The Babylon 5 Roleplaying Game is based on the Babylon 5 TV series. The game's mechanic is the d20 System published by Wizards of the Coast with character classes and races specific to the setting. Characters have a low number of hit points meaning that they can die very easily, in keeping with the show.

== Publication history ==
The Babylon 5 Roleplaying Game was published by Mongoose Publishing in 2003. A second edition of the core rules was published in 2006 using the WotC Open Game License. In 2008 Mongoose published Universe of Babylon 5, a set of rules allowing the game to use Mongoose's edition of Traveller as its RPG engine instead of the d20 System.

== Reception ==
Babylon 5 won the 2004 Silver Ennie Award for "Best Licensed Product".

== Reviews ==
- Backstab #45
- Syfy
