= J. Michael Straczynski bibliography =

- Active period: 1987–present

Publishers
- DC Comics: 1987–2015
- Image Comics: 1999–2016
- Marvel Comics: 2001–2009
- AWA Studios: 2018–present

This is a bibliography of the American screenwriter Joseph Michael Straczynski who has written comics, plays, novels and non-fiction books for several different publishers.

== Plays ==
- Snow White: an assembly length children's play dramatized by J. Michael Straczynski. c. 1979.

== Non-fiction ==
- The Complete Book of Scriptwriting from Writer's Digest Books (265 pages, 1982, ISBN 0-89879-078-6; Second edition, 432 pages, 1996, ISBN 0-89879-512-5; Revised edition, 448 pages, 2002, ISBN 1-58297-158-7)
  - Gardners Books has also released The Complete Book of Scriptwriting: Third edition (432 pages, 1997, ISBN 1-85286-882-1)
- Becoming Superman: My Journey from Poverty to Hollywood from Harper Voyager (hc, 480 pages, 2019, ISBN 0-06-285784-3; sc, 2020, ISBN 0-06-285786-X)
- Becoming a Writer, Staying a Writer: The Artistry, Joy, and Career of Storytelling from BenBella Books (230 pages, 2021, ISBN 1-950665-88-7)

== Selected articles, short stories, introductions, and prefaces ==
According to Straczynski, during the early years of his career he was publishing "roughly five hundred articles, columns, and reviews in six years".

- "A Last Testament for Nick and the Trooper." In Shadows 6, edited by Charles L. Grant (1983). ISBN 0385182597.
- "TV's Weirdest Censors: Looking for Satan in Kids' Cartoons." Penthouse. June 1991.
- "Say Hello, Mr. Quigley." Pulphouse. Sept/Oct 1992.
- Foreword. Ellison Wonderland. 2015 Edition.
- "A Brief Introduction to The Last Dangerous Visions." In The Last Dangerous Visions (2024).
- "Ellison Exegesis." In The Last Dangerous Visions (2024).
- Preface. Harlan Ellison's Greatest Hits. (2024).

== Television scripts ==
Straczynski wrote extensively for television animation and live-action series including He-Man and the Masters of the Universe, She-Ra: Princess of Power, Jayce and the Wheeled Warriors, The Real Ghostbusters, Captain Power and the Soldiers of the Future, Twilight Zone, Walker, Texas Ranger, Jake and the Fatman, Murder, She Wrote, Babylon 5, Crusade, Jeremiah, and Sense8.

In his autobiography Becoming Superman, he notes that within three years of selling his first episode of He-Man and the Masters of the Universe he had written "sixty-six produced scripts, along with dozens of outlines and premises for outside writers, [and] story-edited over 150 freelance scripts".

Straczynski later stated that prior to writing five episodes for "Jake and the Fatman" he had written "eighty-one scripts, averaging eleven to twenty scripts per season".

During the production of Babylon 5, Straczynski served as the primary writer of the series, writing 92 of the show's 110 hour-long episodes as well as five television movies.

== Babylon 5 Novels ==
Several later official Babylon 5 novels were written by other authors but were based on story outlines provided by J. Michael Straczynski.

The Psi Corps Trilogy written by J. Gregory Keyes

- Dark Genesis - The Birth of the Psi Corps (1998, ISBN 0-3454-2715-7)
- Deadly Relations - Bester Ascendant (1999, ISBN 0-3454-2716-5)
- Final Reckoning - The Fate of Bester (1999, ISBN 0-3454-2717-3)

Legions of Fire written by Peter David.

- The Long Night of Centauri Prime (1999, ISBN 0-3454-2718-1)
- Armies of Light and Dark (2000, ISBN 0-3454-2719-X)
- Out of the Darkness (2000, ISBN 0-3454-2720-3)

The Passing of the Techno-Mages written by Jeanne Cavelos.

- Casting Shadows (2001, ISBN 0-3454-2721-1)
- Summoning Light (2001, ISBN 0-3454-2722-X)
- Invoking Darkness (2001, ISBN 0-3454-3833-7)

Novelizations

- Babylon 5: In the Beginning written by Peter David (1998, ISBN 0-3454-2452-2)
- Babylon 5: Thirdspace written by Peter David (1998, ISBN 0-3454-2454-9)
- Babylon 5: A Call to Arms written by Robert Sheckley (1999, ISBN 0-3454-3155-3)

== Babylon 5 Short Stories ==
Straczynski penned a number of short stories expanding on several key story-points from the television series, along with a number of other established authors.

- "The Shadow of His Thoughts," by J. Michael Straczynski (Summer, 1999, Amazing Stories Magazine)
- "Genius Loci," by J. Michael Straczynski (Winter, 2000, Amazing Stories Magazine)
- "Space, Time, and the Incurable Romantic" by J. Michael Straczynski (Summer, 2000, Amazing Stories Magazine); download
- "Hidden Agendas," by J. Michael Straczynski (May 2000, The Official Babylon 5 Magazine)
- "True Seeker," by Fiona Avery (July 2000, The Official Babylon 5 Magazine)
- "The Nautilus Coil," by J. Gregory Keyes (August 2000, The Official Babylon 5 Magazine)

== Babylon 5 Books ==
B5Books.com was a website that published script books, encyclopedias, and other reference works related to the television series Babylon 5.

- The Babylon 5 Scripts of J. Michael Straczynski Volume 1 (2005)
- The Babylon 5 Scripts of J. Michael Straczynski Volume 2 (2005)
- The Babylon 5 Scripts of J. Michael Straczynski Volume 3 (2006)
- The Babylon 5 Scripts of J. Michael Straczynski Volume 4 (2006)
- The Babylon 5 Scripts of J. Michael Straczynski Volume 5 (2006)
- The Babylon 5 Scripts of J. Michael Straczynski Volume 6 (2006)
- The Babylon 5 Scripts of J. Michael Straczynski Volume 7 (2006)
- The Babylon 5 Scripts of J. Michael Straczynski Volume 8 (2006)
- The Babylon 5 Scripts of J. Michael Straczynski Volume 9 (2006)
- The Babylon 5 Scripts of J. Michael Straczynski Volume 10 (2007)
- The Babylon 5 Scripts of J. Michael Straczynski Volume 11 (2007)
- The Babylon 5 Scripts of J. Michael Straczynski Volume 12 (2007)
- The Babylon 5 Scripts of J. Michael Straczynski Volume 13 (2008)
- The Babylon 5 Scripts of J. Michael Straczynski Volume 14 (2008)
- The Babylon 5 Scripts of J. Michael Straczynski Volume 15 (2008)
- Babylon 5 Scripts: Other Voices Volume 1 (2008)
- Babylon 5 Scripts: Other Voices Volume 2 (2008)
- Babylon 5 Scripts: Other Voices Volume 3 (2008)
- Across Time & Space: The Chronologies of B5 (2008, 2012)
- The Babylon 5 Scripts of J. Michael Straczynski TV Movies (2009)
- But In Purple... I'm Stunning (2008, ISBN 978-1-63077-029-7)
- Babylon 5: Artifacts From Beyond The Rim (2010, ISBN 0-98210056-6)
- Crusade: What The Hell Happened? Volume 1 (2010, ISBN 0-9821005-5-8)
- Crusade: What The Hell Happened? Volume 2 (2010, ISBN 978-1-63077-074-7)
- Crusade: What The Hell Happened? Volume 3 (2010, ISBN 978-1-63077-075-4)
- Crusade: Behind The Scenes (2010, ISBN 0-97953938-2)
- Crusade: Other Voices Volume 1 (2011, ISBN 0-98210055-8)
- Crusade: Other Voices Volume 2 (2011, ISBN 0-98210056-6)
- The Babylon 5 Scripts of J. Michael Straczynski Volume 2.5 (2013)
- Encounters with J. Michael Straczynski: Archived by the Great Machine of Epsilon 3 (2014, ISBN 978-1-63077-053-2)
- Highlights from Echoes of All Our Conversations (2014, ISBN 978-1-63077-001-3)
- Highlights from Babylon 5: The Scripts of J. Michael Straczynski (2014, ISBN 978-1-63077-000-6)
- Babylon 5 Encyclopedia: The Final & Complete Edition (2018)
- Echoes Of All Our Conversations The Actors - Part 1 (2023, ISBN 978-1-63077-103-4)
- Echoes Of All Our Conversations The Actors - Part 2 (2023, ISBN 978-1-63077-104-1)
- Echoes Of All Our Conversations The Actors - Part 3 (2023, ISBN 978-1-63077-106-5)
- Echoes Of All Our Conversations The Actors - Bonus Book (2023, ISBN 978-1-63077-110-2)
- Commentaries on Babylon 5: Introductions, Rude Comments & Balderdash Part 1 of 2 (2025)
- Commentaries on Babylon 5: Introductions, Rude Comments & Balderdash Part 2 of 2 (2025)

== Comics ==
=== Early work at DC and Joe's Comics ===
Early in his career, Straczynski penned a few single-issue stories for series based on established franchises:

- DC Comics:
  - Teen Titans Spotlight #13: "Cyborg" (with Chuck Patton, 1987)
  - Star Trek vol. 3 #16: "Worldsinger" (with Gordon Purcell, 1991)
- The Twilight Zone vol. 2 #2: "Blind Alley" (with Todd Foxx, NOW, 1991)

During the original series run of Babylon 5, Straczynski contributed opening issues to two tie-in series (also published by DC Comics):

- Babylon 5 #1: "In Darkness Find Me" (with Michael Netzer, 1995) (Note: Straczynski is also credited with "story premise" in Babylon 5 #5–8 (scripted by Tim DeHaas) and Babylon 5: In Valen's Name #2–3 (scripted by Peter David).) collected in Babylon 5: The Price of Peace (tpb, 128 pages, 1998, ISBN 1-56389-467-X)
- Babylon 5: In Valen's Name #1 (of 3) (with Mike Collins, 1998) collected in Babylon 5: In Valen's Name (tpb, 80 pages, Titan, 1998, ISBN 1-85286-981-X)

Between 1999 and 2006, Straczynski created, wrote and supervised original series under his own imprint Joe's Comics (published by Top Cow):

- Rising Stars (with Keu Cha, Christian Zanier, Ken Lashley, Stuart Immonen (#14) and Brent Anderson, 1999–2005) collected as:
  - Born in Fire (collects #1–8, tpb, 192 pages, 2001, ISBN 1-58240-172-1)
  - Power (collects #9–16, tpb, 192 pages, 2002, ISBN 1-58240-226-4)
  - Fire and Ash (collects #17–24, tpb, 208 pages, 2006, ISBN 1-58240-491-7)
  - Voices of the Dead and Bright (collects Rising Stars: Bright #1–3 and Rising Stars: Voices of the Dead #1–6, (Note: Rising Stars: Bright #1–3, Rising Stars: Voices of the Dead #1–6 and Rising Stars: Untouchable #1–5 are spin-off series written by Fiona Avery and edited by Straczynski.) tpb, 226 pages, 2006, ISBN 1-58240-613-8)
  - Visitations and Untouchable (collects #0, ½, Prelude one-shot and Rising Stars: Untouchable #1–5, tpb, 208 pages, 2007, ISBN 1-58240-268-X)
  - Rising Stars: The Complete Slipcased Edition (collects #0–24, ½ and the Prelude one-shot, hc, 624 pages, 2005, ISBN 1-58240-488-7)
  - Rising Stars Compendium (collects #0–24, ½, Prelude one-shot and the three spin-off series, hc, 1,008 pages, 2009, ISBN 1-60706-032-9; tpb, 2009, ISBN 1-58240-802-5)
- Midnight Nation #1–12, ½ (with Gary Frank, 2000–2002) collected as Midnight Nation (tpb, 288 pages, 2003, ISBN 1-58240-272-8; hc, 304 pages, 2009, ISBN 1-60706-040-X)
- Delicate Creatures (prose novel with illustrations by Michael Zulli, 56 pages, 2001, ISBN 1-58240-225-6)

=== Exclusive contract with Marvel Comics ===
Between 2001 and 2008, Straczynski was under an exclusive contract with Marvel (which nonetheless allowed him to continue writing for Joe's Comics until the launch of Icon):

- The Amazing Spider-Man (with John Romita, Jr., Mike Deodato, Jr., Mark Brooks (#515–518) and Ron Garney, 2001–2007) collected as:
  - Issues #55–56 of the second volume and #503–505 are co-written by Straczynski and Fiona Avery.
    - Ultimate Collection: The Amazing Spider-Man by J. Michael Straczynski Volume 1 (collects vol. 2 #30–45, tpb, 392 pages, 2009, ISBN 0-7851-3893-5)
    - Ultimate Collection: The Amazing Spider-Man by J. Michael Straczynski Volume 2 (collects vol. 2 #46–58 and vol. 1 #500–502, tpb, 416 pages, 2009, ISBN 0-7851-3894-3)
    - Ultimate Collection: The Amazing Spider-Man by J. Michael Straczynski Volume 3 (collects vol. 1 #503–518, tpb, 408 pages, 2010, ISBN 0-7851-3895-1)
    - Ultimate Collection: The Amazing Spider-Man by J. Michael Straczynski Volume 4 (collects vol. 1 #519–528, tpb, 480 pages, 2010, ISBN 0-7851-3896-X)
      - Includes Marvel Knights Spider-Man #21 (written by Straczynski, art by Pat Lee, 2006) as part of "The Other" inter-title crossover.
      - Includes Friendly Neighborhood Spider-Man #3 (written by Straczynski, art by Mike Wieringo, 2006) as part of "The Other" inter-title crossover.
    - Ultimate Collection: The Amazing Spider-Man by J. Michael Straczynski Volume 5 (collects vol. 1 #529–545, tpb, 536 pages, 2010, ISBN 0-7851-3897-8)
      - Includes Friendly Neighborhood Spider-Man #24 (written by Straczynski, art by Joe Quesada, 2007) as part of the "One More Day" inter-title crossover.
      - Includes The Sensational Spider-Man vol. 2 #41 (written by Straczynski, art by Joe Quesada, 2007) as part of the "One More Day" inter-title crossover.
    - The Amazing Spider-Man by J. Michael Straczynski Omnibus Volume 1 (collects vol. 2 #30–58 and vol. 1 #500–514, hc, 1,120 pages, 2019, ISBN 1-302-91706-4)
    - The Amazing Spider-Man by J. Michael Straczynski Omnibus Volume 2 (collects vol. 1 #515–545 and the crossover issues, hc, 1,136 pages, 2020, ISBN 1-302-92313-7)
- Squadron Supreme:
  - Supreme Power (with Gary Frank, Marvel MAX, 2003–2005) collected as:
    - Contact (collects #1–6, tpb, 144 pages, 2004, ISBN 0-7851-1224-3; hc, 2009, ISBN 0-7851-3765-3)
    - Powers and Principalities (collects #7–12, tpb, 144 pages, 2005, ISBN 0-7851-1456-4; hc, 2009, ISBN 0-7851-3772-6)
    - High Command (collects #13–18, tpb, 144 pages, 2006, ISBN 0-7851-1474-2; hc, 2009, ISBN 0-7851-3773-4)
  - Supreme Power: Hyperion #1–5 (with Dan Jurgens, Marvel MAX, 2005–2006) collected as Supreme Power: Hyperion (tpb, 120 pages, 2006, ISBN 0-7851-1895-0; hc, 2009, ISBN 0-7851-3774-2)
  - Squadron Supreme vol. 2 #1–7 (with Gary Frank, Marvel Knights, 2006)
    - Issues #1–5 are collected as Squadron Supreme: The Pre-War Years (hc, 168 pages, 2006, ISBN 0-7851-2282-6; tpb, 2009, ISBN 0-7851-1898-5)
  - Ultimate Power #4–6 (co-written by Straczynski, Jeph Loeb and Brian Michael Bendis, art by Greg Land, 2007) collected in Ultimate Power (hc, 232 pages, 2008, ISBN 0-7851-2366-0; tpb, 2008, ISBN 0-7851-2367-9)
- Strange #1–6 (co-written by Straczynski and Samm Barnes, art by Brandon Peterson, Marvel Knights, 2004–2005) collected as Strange: Beginnings and Endings (tpb, 144 pages, 2005, ISBN 0-7851-1577-3)
- Fantastic Four (with Mike McKone, 2005–2007) collected as:
  - Fantastic Four by J. Michael Straczynski Volume 1 (collects #527–532, hc, 144 pages, 2006, ISBN 0-7851-2029-7; tpb, 2006, ISBN 0-7851-1716-4)
  - The Life Fantastic (includes #533–535, tpb, 152 pages, 2006, ISBN 0-7851-1896-9)
  - The Road to Civil War (includes #536–537, tpb, 160 pages, 2007, ISBN 0-7851-1974-4)
  - Civil War: Fantastic Four (includes #538–541, tpb, 176 pages, 2007, ISBN 0-7851-2227-3)
- Dream Police (with Mike Deodato, Jr., one-shot, Icon, 2005)
- The Book of Lost Souls #1–6 (with Colleen Doran, Icon, 2005–2006)
  - Collected as The Book of Lost Souls: Introductions All Around (tpb, 144 pages, 2006, ISBN 0-7851-1940-X)
  - A second series was announced for 2014, planned to be published under the Joe's Comics imprint at Image.
- Bullet Points #1–5 (with Tommy Lee Edwards, 2007) collected as Bullet Points (tpb, 120 pages, 2007, ISBN 0-7851-2010-6)
- Ultimate Civil War: Spider-Ham (featuring Wolverham) (with various artists, one-shot, 2007) collected in Secret Wars Too (tpb, 208 pages, 2016, ISBN 1-302-90211-3)
- Silver Surfer: Requiem #1–4 (with Esad Ribić, Marvel Knights, 2007) collected as Silver Surfer: Requiem (hc, 104 pages, 2007, ISBN 0-7851-2848-4; tpb, 2008, ISBN 0-7851-1796-2)
- Thor vol. 3 (with Olivier Coipel and Marko Djurdjević, 2007–2009) collected as:
  - Volume 1 (collects #1–6, hc, 160 pages, 2008, ISBN 0-7851-3011-X; tpb, 2009, ISBN 0-7851-1716-4)
  - Volume 2 (collects #7–12 and #600, hc, 200 pages, 2009, ISBN 0-7851-3034-9; tpb, 2009, ISBN 0-7851-1760-1)
  - Volume 3 (collects #601–603 and the Thor Giant-Size Finale one-shot, hc, 112 pages, 2010, ISBN 0-7851-4269-X; tpb, 2010, ISBN 0-7851-2950-2)
  - Thor by J. Michael Straczynski Omnibus (collects #1–12, 600–603 and the Thor Giant-Size Finale one-shot, hc, 520 pages, 2010, ISBN 0-7851-4029-8)
  - Thor By Straczynski & Gillen Omnibus (collects Fantastic Four #536-537, Thor #1-12, Thor 600–603 and the Thor Giant-Size Finale one-shot plus works of other writers, hc, 1144 pages, 2024, ISBN 1-3029-5301-X)
- The Twelve #1–12 (with Chris Weston, 2008–2012) collected as The Twelve (hc, 328 pages, 2013, ISBN 0-7851-2715-1; tpb, 2014, ISBN 0-7851-5430-2)

=== Brief tenure at DC Comics proper ===
Straczynski moved to DC, working on short or out-of-continuity stories following his experience with crossover events at Marvel:

- The Brave and the Bold vol. 3 #27–35 (with Jesús Saiz, Chad Hardin + Justiniano (#31) and Cliff Chiang (#33), 2009–2010)
  - Straczynski expressed interest in writing a Lex Luthor/Swamp Thing team-up but the latter character was tied to Vertigo.
  - Collected as Team-Ups of the Brave and the Bold (hc, 176 pages, 2010, ISBN 1-4012-2793-7; tpb, 2011, ISBN 1-4012-2809-7)
- The Red Circle (series of one-shots intended to introduce the licensed Archie Comics superheroes into the DC Universe):
  - The Shield: Kicking Down the Door (tpb, 160 pages, 2010, ISBN 1-4012-2769-4) includes:
    - The Shield (with Scott McDaniel, 2009)
    - The Inferno (with Greg Scott, 2009)
  - The Hangman (with Tom Derenick, 2009)
  - The Web (with Roger Robinson, 2009)
- Samaritan X (unproduced graphic novel, announced in 2010)
- Superman:
  - Superman #700–703, 705–706: "Grounded" (with Eddy Barrows and Wellington Diaz (#705), 2010–2011)
    - Straczynski left the title, and the storyline was continued by Chris Roberson until The New 52 relaunch.
    - Collected in Superman: Grounded Volume 1 (hc, 168 pages, 2011, ISBN 1-4012-3075-X; tpb, 2012, ISBN 1-4012-3076-8)
  - Superman: Earth One (series of graphic novels set in an alternate universe and published under its own imprint):
    - Volume 1 (with Shane Davis, hc, 136 pages, 2010, ISBN 1-4012-2468-7; sc, 2013, ISBN 1-4012-2469-5)
    - Volume 2 (with Shane Davis, hc, 136 pages, 2012, ISBN 1-4012-3196-9; sc, 2014, ISBN 1-4012-3559-X)
    - Volume 3 (with Ardian Syaf, hc, 136 pages, 2015, ISBN 1-4012-4184-0; sc, 2015, ISBN 1-4012-5909-X)
- Wonder Woman #600–605: "Odyssey" (with Don Kramer and Eduardo Pansica, 2010–2011)
  - Straczynski left the title, and the storyline was continued by Phil Hester until The New 52 relaunch.
  - Collected in Wonder Woman: Odyssey Volume 1 (hc, 168 pages, 2011, ISBN 1-4012-3077-6; tpb, 2012, ISBN 1-4012-3078-4)
- Before Watchmen: Dr. Manhattan / Nite Owl (hc, 288 pages, 2013, ISBN 1-4012-3894-7, tpb, 2014, ISBN 1-4012-4514-5) collects:
  - Before Watchmen: Nite Owl #1–4 (with Andy and Joe Kubert, 2012–2013)
  - Before Watchmen: Dr. Manhattan #1–4 (with Adam Hughes, 2012–2013)
  - Before Watchmen: Moloch #1–2 (with Eduardo Risso, 2013)
- The Flash: Earth One (unproduced graphic novel, announced in 2015)

=== Joe's Comics 2.0 and later work ===
After a decade of working almost exclusively on Big Two properties, Straczynski once again took on two series based on established multimedia franchises, The Terminator and The Twilight Zone:

- Liberty Annual '11: "Separation of Church and State" (with Kevin Sacco, anthology, Image, 2011) collected in CBLDF Presents: Liberty (hc, 216 pages, 2014, ISBN 1-60706-937-7; tpb, 2016, ISBN 1-60706-996-2)
- Terminator Salvation: The Final Battle (with Pete Woods, Dark Horse, 2013–2014) collected as:
  - Volume 1 (collects #1–6, tpb, 152 pages, 2014, ISBN 1-61655-499-1)
  - Volume 2 (collects #7–12, tpb, 152 pages, 2015, ISBN 1-61655-625-0)
- The Twilight Zone vol. 3 (with Guiu Vilanova, Dynamite, 2013–2015) collected as:
  - The Way Out (collects #1–4, tpb, 104 pages, 2014, ISBN 1-60690-505-8)
  - The Way In (collects #5–8, tpb, 120 pages, 2014, ISBN 1-60690-543-0)
  - The Way Back (collects #9–12, tpb, 104 pages, 2015, ISBN 1-60690-543-0)

In 2013, Straczynski revived the Joe's Comics brand (this time, the titles were published by Image Central):

- Ten Grand (with Ben Templesmith, C. P. Smith and Matthew Dow Smith (#12), 2013–2015) collected as:
  - Volume 1 (collects #1–6, tpb, 160 pages, 2014, ISBN 1-60706-831-1)
  - Volume 2 (collects #7–12, tpb, 160 pages, 2015, ISBN 1-63215-010-7)
- Sidekick (with Tom Mandrake, 2013–2015) collected as:
  - Volume 1 (collects #1–6, tpb, 160 pages, 2014, ISBN 1-60706-861-3)
  - Volume 2 (collects #7–12, tpb, 160 pages, 2016, ISBN 1-63215-026-3)
- Protectors, Inc. #1–10 (with Gordon Purcell, 2013–2014)
  - Issues #1–6 are collected as Protectors, Inc. Volume 1 (tpb, 160 pages, 2014, ISBN 1-63215-049-2)
- The Adventures of Apocalypse Al #1–4 (with Sid Kotian, 2013–2014) collected as The Adventures of Apocalypse Al (tpb, 128 pages, 2014, ISBN 1-60706-980-6)
- Alone (with Bill Sienkiewicz, unproduced 6-issue limited series — initially announced for 2014)
- Dream Police #1–12 (with Sid Kotian, 2014–2016)

In 2016, Straczynski announced his retirement from comics.
However, in 2018 he joined the "Creative Counsel" of the new publisher AWA Studios and penned a number of series for its superhero universe:

- The Resistance:
  - The Resistance #1–6 (with Mike Deodato, Jr., 2020) collected as The Resistance (tpb, 144 pages, 2020, ISBN 1-7334993-1-8)
  - The Resistance: Reborns #1–5 (with C. P. Smith, digital, 2020) published in print as The Resistance: Reborns (one-shot, January 2021)
  - The Resistance: Uprising #1–6 (with C. P. Smith, 2021) collected as The Resistance: Uprising (tpb, 144 pages, 2021, ISBN 1-953165-22-2)
- Moths #1–6 (with Mike Choi, 2021) collected as Moths (tpb, 144 pages, 2022, ISBN 1-953165-24-9)
- Telepaths #1–6 (with Steve Epting, 2021–2022) collected as Telepaths (tpb, 144 pages, 2022, ISBN 1-953165-30-3)
- The Madness #1-6 (2023-2024)
- U&I #1-6 (2024)

During this period, Straczynski also contributed a few short stories for various anniversary publications by Marvel:

- Marvel Comics #1000: "What Do You Regret?" (with Ed McGuinness, anthology, 2019) collected in Marvel Comics 1000 (hc, 144 pages, 2020, ISBN 1-302-92137-1)
- Thor vol. 6 #24: "Benedictions" (with Olivier Coipel, co-feature, 2022) collected in Thor: God of Hammers (tpb, 184 pages, 2022, ISBN 1-302-92613-6)
- Thanos: Death Notes: "Love and Death and Much in Between" (with Geoff Shaw, anthology one-shot, 2023)

He continued with Marvel for runs on Captain America (#1-16), 1776 (#1-5), and The Amazing Spider-Man: Torn (#1-5) plus several one-shots collected as Marvel Tales.

- Captain America (vol. 11 #1–16 [#751–766]):
  - Vol. 1: Stand (tpb, 160 pages, 2024, ISBN 1-3029-5567-5)
  - Vol. 2: Trying To Come Home (tpb, 120 pages, 2024, ISBN 1-3029-5568-3)
  - Vol. 3: Broxton Rising (tpb, 112 pages, 2025, ISBN 1-3029-5569-1)
- Marvel Tales (Collecting Doctor Doom & Rocket Raccoon #1, Captain America & Volstagg #1, Nick Fury vs. Fin Fang Foom #1, Hulk & Doctor Strange #1, Ghost Rider vs. Galactus #1 and Spider-Man vs. the Sinister Sixteen #1, tpb, 200 pages, 2025, ISBN 1-3029-4813-X)

== Novels and short story collections ==
- Demon Night (hc, 340 pages, Dutton Adult, 1988, ISBN 0-525-24646-0; sc, 304 pages, iBooks, 2003, ISBN 0-7434-7522-4)
- Tales from the New Twilight Zone (short stories adapted from Straczynski's scripts, Bantam Spectra, 1989, ISBN 0-553-28286-7)
- Othersyde: A Novel (hc, 294 pages, Dutton Adult, 1990, ISBN 0-525-24873-0; sc, 304 pages, iBooks, 2004, ISBN 0-7434-8720-6)
- Tribulations (sc, 224 pages, Prime Books, 2000, ISBN 1-930997-03-5)
- Straczynski Unplugged (sc, 224 pages, iBooks, 2004, ISBN 0-7434-7956-4)
- Together We Will Go (hc, 304 pages, Scout Press, 2021, ISBN 1-9821-4258-8)
- The Glass Box (hc, 350 pages, Blackstone Publishing, 2024, ISBN 979-8-212-00779-5)
