= Joe's Comics =

- Parent company: Currently; Image Comics; Studio JMS; Formerly; Top Cow Productions
- Founded: 1998
- Founder: J. Michael Straczynski
- Country of origin: United States
- Headquarters location: Berkeley, California
- Key people: J. Michael Straczynski; Patricia Tallman
- Publication types: Comic books, books
- Official website: studiojms.com/about-joes-comics/

Joe's Comics is an American comic book imprint of Image Comics run by J. Michael Straczynski's Studio JMS and was originally published as an imprint of Top Cow Productions. As of 2014, key titles in the current line include Dream Police, The Book of Lost Souls, Ten Grand, Protectors Inc, and Sidekick.

== History ==
=== Top Cow (1998–early 2000s) ===
In 1998, Joe’s Comics was established as an imprint publishing Straczynski's comic work including the critically lauded Midnight Nation with artist Gary Frank, Rising Stars, and Delicate Creatures, an illustrated fantasy parable.

Straczynski had a falling-out with Top Cow over movie scripts for Rising Stars in the mid-2000s, and after communication broke down their relationship came to a stand-still. Straczynski held back the final (already written) issues of Rising Stars until Straczynski and Top Cow finally came to an agreement after a nearly two-year hiatus. Straczynski subsequently took Dream Police to Marvel Comics's Icon imprint, which also published his The Book of Lost Souls. Several Rising Stars spin-offs not written by Straczynski were published under Joe's Comics through 2005.

=== Image (2012–present) ===
The imprint was dormant until Straczynski announced at the 2012 San Diego Comic-Con that he was reviving it as part of his new media company, Studio JMS. The first title, the horror-noir Ten Grand initially illustrated by Ben Templesmith, came out in May 2013 and Sidekick came out in July. Further titles written by Straczynski and published by Joe's Comics in 2014 include Protectors Inc, The Adventures of Apocalypse Al (originally produced for MTV Comics), Alone, and the return of former Icon titles Dream Police and The Book of Lost Souls (both scheduled for 2014).

== Titles published by Joe's Comics ==
Titles published by Top Cow's short-lived Joe's Comics imprint include:

- Rising Stars (with Keu Cha, Ken Lashley, Christian Zanier, Stuart Immonen, Brent Eric Anderson and Gary Frank, 1999–2005) collected as:
  - Born in Fire (collects #1–8, tpb, 192 pages, 2001, ISBN 1-58240-172-1)
  - Power (collects #9–16, tpb, 192 pages, 2002, ISBN 1-58240-226-4)
  - Fire and Ash (collects #17–24, tpb, 208 pages, 2006, ISBN 1-58240-491-7)
  - Voices of the Dead/Bright (collects RS: Voices of the Dead #1–6 and RS: Bright #1–3, tpb, 226 pages, 2006, ISBN 1-58240-613-8)
  - Visitations/Untouchable (collects #0, ½, Prelude and RS: Untouchable #1–6, tpb, 208 pages, 2007, ISBN 1-58240-268-X)
  - RS Omnibus (collects #0–24, ½ and Prelude, hc, 624 pages, 2005, ISBN 1-58240-488-7)
  - RS Compendium (collects #0–24, ½, Prelude and the spin-offs, hc, 1008 pages, 2009, ISBN 1-60706-032-9; tpb, 2009, ISBN 1-58240-802-5)
- Midnight Nation #1–12 (with Gary Frank, 2000–2002) (tpb, 288 pages, 2003, ISBN 1-58240-272-8; hc, 304 pages, 2009, ISBN 1-60706-040-X)
- Delicate Creatures (with Michael Zulli, graphic novel, hc, 56 pages, 2001, ISBN 1-58240-225-6)

Joe's Comics was revived at Image Comics in 2013:

- Ten Grand with Ben Templesmith and CP Smith (May 2013 – January 2015)
- Sidekick with Tom Mandrake (August 2013 – December 2015)
- Protectors Inc with Gordon Purcell (November 2013 – November 2014)
- The Adventures of Apocalypse Al with Sid Kotian (February 2014 – May 2014)
- Dream Police with Sid Kotian (April 2014 - September 2016). A sequel to a one-shot comic of the same name published by Marvel's Icon Comics line.
- Alone with Bill Sienkiewicz (scheduled for 2014). It was never published.
- The Book of Lost Souls with Colleen Doran (scheduled for 2014). A planned sequel to the 2005 mini series of the same name published by Marvel/Icon. This sequel was never published.
