= Rising Stars (comics) =

American series of superhero comic books

- Cover of Rising Stars #1

Publication information
- Publisher: Joe's Comics (Top Cow)
- Schedule: Monthly
- Format: Limited series
- Genre: Superhero
- Publication date: August 1999 – March 2005
- No. of issues: 24
- Main character: Characters

Creative team
- Created by: J. Michael Straczynski
- Written by: J. Michael Straczynski
- Penciller(s): Keu Cha; Ken Lashley; Christian Zanier; Brent Anderson
- Inker(s): Jason Gorder; John Livesay; Edwin Rosell; Marlo Alquiza; Brent Anderson
- Letterer(s): David Wohl; Dennis Heisler; Dreamer Design; Robin Spehar
- Colorist(s): Liquid! Matt Nelson; John Starr; Tyson Wengler
- Editor(s): Dennis Heisler; Renae Geerlings

Collected editions
- Compendium: ISBN 1-60706-032-9

Rising Stars is a 24-issue comic book limited series written by J. Michael Straczynski about 113 people (called "Specials") born with special abilities following the appearance of a mysterious light in the sky above Pederson, Illinois. The series explores how society may react to the advent of superpowers, and how those who are Specials may react towards society and each other. Rising Stars was one of the first comics produced under Straczynski's own Joe's Comics imprint for Top Cow Productions.

== Publication history ==
The comic was published in August 1999, monthly at first by Top Cow/Image Comics, and then under the Joe's Comics imprint. Within a few months, however, there were unscheduled artist changes and unexplained delays by Top Cow in shipping the comics, sometimes lasting months.

The comic itself came to an unexpected halt after issue 21 due to internal arguments between Straczynski and Top Cow. Straczynski claimed he was cut out of the loop on the potential Rising Stars movie. After communication broke down between them, he held back the scripts for the last three issues, and the entire comic was put on hold. In addition to an apology for the way Straczynski was treated in regard to the possible film, Top Cow relented by giving him the full rights to an anthology comic he had written for them, Dream Police (later published by Marvel Comics), as well as the rights to the name and logo for the Joe's Comics imprint.

The last issue of Rising Stars was published in March 2005. During the intervening time, Straczynski had gone on to write a revamp of Marvel's Squadron Supreme, Supreme Power.

== Story ==
The story is narrated from the future by the last living Special, John Simon, nicknamed "Poet". The genesis of the Specials is shown to be the unforgettable descent of a fierce comet from the heavens. The story starts when the Specials are all grown up, but it constantly flashes back to when they were children. Through these flashbacks, the development of these 113 Specials is shown, starting with the government's monitoring and handling of the events, to the manifestation of their powers, to the impact of these abilities on the afflicted children and the world around them. Some of the Specials use their powers for the good of the world, others for personal benefit and fame, while others simply wish to forget about them and live a normal life.

A series of murders of the Specials spurs John to investigate. He learns that when a Special dies, their "energy" transfers to the remaining Specials, making each more powerful. This fact had become known to a Special with multiple personality disorder, who calls herself Critical Maas. It emerges that Maas has been manipulating "Patriot" (the alter ego of Jason Miller) to kill other Specials so her own power would be increased. At the instigation of Maas, the U.S. government also attacks the Specials, killing more. With her newly increased powers, Maas and a handful of Specials under her telepathic control are able to conquer Chicago, claiming it for themselves.

Ten years pass and John, his half-brother Randy Fisk (alter ego: Ravenshadow), Elizabeth Chandra, and Joshua Kane (alter ego: Sanctuary) lead the rest of the Specials in an attempt to liberate Chicago after the U.S. government promises that all charges against them will be dropped. Maas is defeated, but at a price: Matthew Bright, who had been sent by the government to assist in her defeat, is beaten into a coma by Patriot, while the latter was still under Maas' control.

Seeing that internecine conflict was not what they were empowered for, John proclaims that he wants them all to act as a unit so they can help humanity. The violence in Chicago affected the rest of the Specials as well and they all agree to assist John in his mission.

Another ten years pass, and their mission is almost complete. Humanity has been helped by the Specials, and more importantly, has been given the confidence and resources to further help themselves. But after Randy Fisk wins the Presidency, elements in the U.S. government, seeing the Specials as a threat to their power, plot to assassinate the remaining few.

A bomb, specifically designed to destroy even the most powerful Special, is set off during a gathering of almost all the Specials, excepting John who is busy working on a secret project. All present are killed, including Randy and John's lover, Elizabeth Chandra.

The released power is initially distributed amongst all the people of the world, instantly curing all forms of illness and injury. It also grants everyone limited telepathy, bringing an end to all wars, violence, and strife as people become aware of the thoughts and feelings of those they had previously viewed as their enemies. Those involved in the mass assassination voluntarily come forward and confess. For 24 hours, not a single human being dies.

After that blessed 24 hours, the power soars into the sky and seeks out John, giving him all its power and knocking him out for seven days. He uses that power to provide energy for the project he had been working on: a space ship that travels near the speed of light.

The immense power within John directs the ship to yet another world, an alien planet much like Earth. John's ship erupts into a fireball, strikingly similar to the one that had empowered the Specials, as it comes crashing down onto the planet's surface. It can be assumed that a process similar to what happened with the Specials would happen to this planet's populace. The circle has been completed. The meaning is that all life is special, and though they may have lost all heroes in a sad circumstance, something good has resulted from the struggle. As the cycle repeats, perhaps a new generation will learn the same lessons.

== Characters ==
=== Specials ===
There are 113 Specials, with the story focusing on a select few and featuring others in supporting or background roles. Only 25 are named in the comic while others are named in the novelizations.

1. John Simon (Poet) – Poet and writer, but not a very popular one. As a child he maintained a distance from many of the other Specials, his closest friend being Dr. Welles. It is commonly known that he has a knack with electronics; he can avoid security systems, and is sensitive to electrical impulses. Secretly, he is the most "lethal" of all the Specials – whereas the other 112 Specials have powers fueled by the energy of the Flash, Poet can control that energy directly. Though not the fastest or strongest, he is the deadliest, with Dr. Welles predicting that he has the potential to defeat any of the other Specials in one-on-one combat. This leads to the theory that John is a fail-safe of the 113, the best candidate to eliminate threats should any of the Specials go rogue. John is the first to suspect that someone is murdering Specials, and takes it upon himself to solve the mystery as well as record the story of the Specials. He allies himself with Randy Fisk, who is later revealed to be his half-brother, and eventually forms a romantic relationship with Chandra. During the events at Chicago, he temporarily dies before being brought back by Cathy Holmes.
2. Matthew Bright – A police officer with the powers of flight, super-strength and speed, near-invulnerability, making him among the strongest of the Specials. At first he hid his identity as a Special so as to join the police. After a series of serial bombings, he is exposed and the Federal Government revokes his badge as Specials are not allowed to participate in any form of government department. His fellow officers then name him a 'special' deputy rank and supply a new badge and uniform. Being the only one of the Specials with legal power and authority, he is often used by the government as a means of controlling or observing conflict relating to other Specials. After the events in Chicago, he is comatose.
3. Jason Miller (formerly Flagg and Patriot) – Masked corporate superhero employed by NexusCorp, later turned vigilante – With the powers of super-strength, flight, near-invulnerability and the power to sense radiation, he was initially considered the strongest among the Specials. Jason was seduced by Stephanie Maas and taken over by her split personality Critical Mass. He was used to murder other specials so that their power would transfer to the rest and eventually would have allowed Critical the ability to control them all. After being freed of Critical's control, Jason resolves to use his powers for the greater good – stealing nuclear weapon and burying deep within the arctic, ushering in a celebrated nuclear disarmament. A punctured nuclear missile gives him radiation poisoning, which causes the deaths of his family and his own disfigurement. He later dies, protecting (and unwittingly waking up) a comatose Matthew Bright.
4. Elizabeth Chandra (former model) – Appears as the physically ideal woman to whoever is looking at her, she lives in a mansion with a large number of wealthy benefactors who she requires all to wear masks. Later gains the ability to inspire love rather than lust in both male and female onlookers, and holds fund raisers in order to help the Specials' cause. She is in love with John Simon, who is the only one of the male Specials to never ask her out, and the only one who sees her as she really is. They later become a couple. Post-surge, she develops super strength, and much later, the power of flight.
5. Randy Fisk (Ravenshadow) – Artist – Flight, super-strength, ability to see things nobody else can, agility, is sensitive to electrical impulses, energy projection. He is the first of the Specials to don a mask and attempt vigilante, and is at first the most organised and prepared of the Specials, funding his crime-fighting by creating and selling his art. He is revealed to be John Simon's half-brother. Later, he dedicates himself to ridding the streets of criminal activity, inspiring people to stand up for themselves. He later runs for president – failing several times before finally becoming elected and ushering in an age of peace and prosperity in the United States.
6. Stephanie Maas/Critical Mass – Stephanie was one of the children in utero during the time of the Flash, although she initially is believed to not have any powers. Later it is revealed that she has the powers of flight, super-strength, mind-control and telepathy, although these powers are only accessible by Critical Mass, the second identity that she developed as a child to cope with the abuse of her father. Critical eventually becomes the dominant personality as she gains control of Jason Miller and other Specials, forcing them to kill other Specials thereby making Critical stronger. At the end of the events at Chicago, Stephanie regains brief control and throws herself into a fire to put an end to Critical's killing spree.
7. Jerry Montrose (Pyre) – Pyrokinetic – Controls fire, capable of surrounding his body in intense heat without burning and the ability to fly as well as enhanced strength. Pyre is considered a rogue, the supervillain to Jason Miller's superhero, with whom he has a very public rivalry. It is shown that they are in fact, good friends along with Joshua Kane, albeit sharing a tense relationship at times. Later he dedicates his time to burning the cocaine fields in Columbia, and being paid for his presence by casinos in Las Vegas. He is later tricked, shot down and murdered by the US government during their trials to test whether or not an EMP blast could temporarily de-power a Special.
8. Paula Ramirez – Singer – She has a singing voice that cannot be recorded and transmitted via any man-made device, and any who hear it cannot remember what they have heard, only that it was incredibly beautiful. She later becomes a famous performer and concert darling.
9. William Smith – Flight, super-strength and speed, can locate the rest of Specials and limited telepathy. Called 'Willie' as a child, he could only hover a few feet as he was the victim of teasing over his weight and this directly affected his confidence and in turn his abilities. During a particularly rough day Willie "snapped" as it is put and proceeded to float off and leaves not to be seen again until he saves Cathy Holmes in Chicago from Critical Maas. He views John Simon as the only one of the Specials he has any obligation to help, as John was the only one who stood by him when he was being bullied.
10. Joshua Kane (Sanctuary) – Televangelist – Levitation, energy absorption, ability to generate and concentrate light. The son of a preacher who capitalises on Joshua's very holy looking abilities by calling it a blessing from God and building a church around him. Although he wishes to obey his father, Joshua feels oppressed and lonely due to the fact that he is a transvestite and must hide who he is. His childhood friends Jerry Montrose and Jason Miller are the only ones aware of this. During the events at Chicago, after being protected by Chandra he disappears into a clothing store. Later he protects Chandra from Critical's hybrid beasts and absorbs the explosion from a nuke intended to destroy a group of Specials, saving everyone – although he performs these tasks after having changed into women's clothing and directly after his death, many of the Specials have no idea who it was that saved them.
11. Laurel Darkhaven – Telekinetic government assassin. Laurel is a telekinetic, described as the only one of the Specials that can scare even John Simon. Laurel is able to move small objects – the smaller the object the finer her control. It is thought to be a useless ability at first, but given the fact that she can target small arteries and kill untraceably with this power, she is immediately employed by a government agency upon her graduation. After realising that none of her work has helped facilitate peace in the Middle-East, she plans to destroy several sacred landmarks in order to unite them in fear of her, but convinced of an alternative path by John Simon, Laurel expends her life force to bring fertile soil, grain by grain, to the surface of the land and cover the desert, hoping that the fertile earth will provide for all and eliminate the need to wage war of land.
12. Lionel Zerb – Medium – Detached and distant, the other children in the encampment believe him to be a snob before it is revealed that he is constantly listening to the voices of the recently deceased. Later on, he develops the ability to listen to even those long deceased. To get some peace and quiet, he moves far up into the mountains unpopulated by humans where he will no longer have to deal with the voices of the dead.
13. Cathy Holmes – Healer - Cathy grows up believing herself to be one of the children in utero during the Flash that was not given any powers, but is revealed that she has healing powers, and is able to revive the recently deceased. Critical Mass captures her and forces her to bring to life Frankenstein-like monsters, made up of stitched together parts of different animals. She is released by William Smith, but is shot by one of Critical's lackeys. Her last act before dying is to bring back the defeated John Simon.
14. Brody Kempler – Supergenius – Described as being smarter than all of the world's most renowned genii put together. Although out of contact with the other Specials for a long time, John Simon eventually reaches out to him. Brody supplies the Specials with cover identities and develops several fail-safe technologies should anything happen to any of the Specials. He also becomes Randy Fisk's scientific consultant upon his presidential election.
15. Clarence Mack – Psychologist – Telepathically visits other people's dreams. While visiting Jason Miller's dreams, he discovers that he is the murderer who has been killing other Specials. He is killed by Jason for this, but is able to contact John Simon via Lionel Zerb, revealing to him what he knows. He also reveals to John that Chandra has always been in love with him, to John's surprise.
16. Peter Dawson – Invulnerable – a microthin energy shield protects his body from all injury, and filters his environment. As result, he has no physical sensation, except for taste – leading to excessive overeating and obesity. He cannot be physically injured, or poisoned in any way. Peter was murdered by Patriot while under Critical Mass' control. Patriot placed a plastic bag over his head and tied him down, the shield covering Peters' body meant he could not feel this happening and suffocated.
17. Lee Jackson – Pyrokinetic – Lee's abilities are similar to Jerry Montrose (Pyre). Abused as a child by a camp counselor, Lee later burned him alive using his powers after the counselor attempted to abuse him again. This became the first instance of a Special using his power for harm, leading the U.S. government to review their policies. Lee is also believed to have accidentally killed his parents by burning down their apartment while having a nightmare. He lived on the streets and was eventually taken in by an old woman, who was later killed by a gang of thugs. This led to a highly publicized rampage from Lee, who committed suicide in a violent explosion after killing the gang responsible.
18. David Mueller – Able to merge his mind with people within 20 feet. David lost his consciousness when his mother committed suicide while he was in her mind trying to stop her, his comatose body was killed when Jason Miller threw it out a hospital window.
19. Patrick Ferry – Patrick has the ability to disappear into shadows and go anywhere without being noticed.
20. Ted Kramer – Able to fly by transforming his lower body into an energy field following the Surge. He is a husband and father who mostly lives a normal life until the final battle against Critical Mass causes many neutral Specials to lend their assistance.
21. Eli Kindler– Telekinetic-He is a critic of John's early leadership efforts and inadvertently leads the military to the ranch where they kill several Specials by giving his sister-in-law directions to meet his family over a wiretapped phone line.
22. Ed Massie – A Special of an unknown ability, he is seemingly one of Critical Mass's followers in Chicago but does not wish to fight his fellow Specials and hides throughout the final battle against her.
23. Joey Drake –Able to alter the humidity of a limited area, he was the first special killed by the brainwashed Jason Miller. He is only mentioned and never appears in person, save for in a dream where Lionel Zerb conflates him with David Mueller.
24. Sam – A Special with unknown powers who is one of the many who continue living normal lives in their hometown, Pederson. He and his neighbors are arrested by the U.S. government due to the manipulations of Critical Mass. Sam surrenders peacefully to protect his family but, following the Surge, the government finds itself unable to keep any of the Captive Specials prisoner.
25. Steven Bowers – The first Special killed by the U.S. government in the event that triggers the Surge, his power is unknown.
26. Susan Kindler (née Casey)–Hairdresser –Transmutation. Eli’s wife, who joins him in hiding along with their two children. She does not appear to be a Special is in the original comics but is identified as one in the novelizations.
27. Novel Specials– A large number of background Specials from the comics receive names and/or descriptions of their powers in the novel trilogy by Arthur Byron Cover, including Renee Cabana (clairvoyant), Buzz (supergenius), Roy Harper (necromancy), David Shea (Mentalist), Gretchen (transparent), Mary Lesh (multilingualism), Roy Utall and Olaf (able to read books just by touching the pages, even while blindfolded), Link (Hyperosmia), Bridget O'Miley and Constance (Love magic), Deedee Noonan (electricity generation), Red Lansing (physical intangibility), Ian Erwin (flight), Samson Biggs, Gary Feldman (mind control), Connie Whitten, Wolfboy, Bongo Shankar (superhuman elasticity), Thjis Van Ward (aura reader), Maximum Hacker (taste and smell adapter), Lilith (reptilian humanoid), Louise Schroder, Tommy Knofler, Bob Hillman, and Tina McIntyre (flame emission), Diana Katz (energy emitter), Bill Lassendale, Mose Flanders, Hugh Dinger, Selma Burke (glass transmutation), David Clarke (flight), Bart Franz (superhuman strength), Ryan Middleton, Bombast (soundwave emissions), Nick Peel (radio transmission interception), Jackie Crosby, Big Bob Hardy (shapeshifter), Lucy Stradella, Luigi Moline, Mick Green,Marcy Finn, and Rita Young.

At first, the Specials possessed varying levels of power, ranging from the clearly superhuman, such as Matthew Bright and Jason Miller, to almost negligible abilities like being invisible when not in direct sunlight. However, when a Special died, the energy they possessed was evenly distributed among the rest, making them stronger. In an incident similar to the Waco Siege, seven Specials were killed in a matter of seconds. The resultant transfer of energy, later known as the Surge, was enough to turn all specials regardless of their standing into high powered individuals.

=== Others ===
1. Dr. William Welles – The Supreme Court assigned Dr. Welles to the Specials shortly after their powers manifested in order to document their abilities and teach them to cope with their new powers. Further, he was to compile files on each to be used by government should any of the Specials ever go rogue. He has a close personal friendship with John Simon (Poet), whose main power he never reveals. Dr. Welles dies halfway through the story, leaving John Simon to solve the Specials crisis.
2. Jacob Polachek – although Dr. Welles declared him not a Special, he insisted he had powers that nobody knew about. Nobody believed him, and when he attempted to stop a truck soon after, he was killed. In Rising Stars #½, this character is elaborated upon, although his name is Edward Claiborn. Edward is committed into the Specials' encampment for observation after claiming to have powers, but is released when it is revealed he has been making it up. He dies pushing his friend out of the path of an oncoming truck. This may actually (likely) be two different people.

== Spin-offs ==
=== Rising Stars: Bright ===
The first Rising Stars spin-off, a three-issue miniseries, written by Fiona Avery, penciled by Dan Jurgens and published in Feb–Apr 2003, is about Matthew Bright's rookie years as a police officer in the NYPD under the name Brendan Miller, after he left Pederson.

=== Rising Stars: Voices of the Dead ===
The six-issue miniseries Rising Stars: Voices of the Dead features Lionel Zerb, a Special who can see dead people, and was published in Apr–Dec 2005. It was again written by Fiona Avery, with pencils by Staz Johnson and Al Rio. The story concentrates on various mysteries Lionel uncovers because of his ability.

=== Rising Stars: Untouchable ===
The five-issue miniseries Rising Stars: Untouchable features Laurel Darkhaven, a Special who worked for the CIA as an assassin. Written by Fiona Avery with pencils by Brent Anderson, it was published in February–June 2006.

== Collected editions ==
Typical of Straczynski, the beginning and end of the story were planned before he wrote the first issue. It was set to span 24 issues, and neatly divide up into three acts. Each trade paperback collects one of those acts.

- Rising Stars Vol. 1: Born in Fire (collects Rising Stars #1–8; ISBN 1-58240-172-1)
- Rising Stars Vol. 2: Power (collects Rising Stars #9–16; ISBN 1-58240-226-4)
- Rising Stars Vol. 3: Fire and Ash (collects Rising Stars #17–24; ISBN 1-58240-491-7)
- Rising Stars: Visitations (collects Rising Stars #0, ½, Prelude and Preview; ISBN 1-58240-268-X)
- Rising Stars Hardcover (collects Rising Stars #1–24, 0, ½ and Prelude; ISBN 1-58240-488-7)
- Rising Stars Vol.4 (collects Rising Stars: Bright and Rising Stars: Voices of the Dead; ISBN 1-58240-613-8)

All the publications are collected in one volume:

- Rising Stars Compendium (collects Rising Stars #1–24, 0, ½, Prelude, Rising Stars: Bright, Rising Stars: Voice of the Dead, and Rising Stars: Untouchable; 1008 pages, Image Comics, December 2008, hardcover, ISBN 1-60706-032-9, softcover, ISBN 1-58240-802-5)

== In other media ==
=== Film adaptation ===
In 2001 the series has been described as in the development stage for a film or TV treatment.

In 2016, MGM optioned Rising Stars, with Straczynski slated to write the script and Alex Gartner and Richard Suckle to produce for Atlas Entertainment.

=== Novelization ===
Between 2002 and 2005, a novelization of Rising Stars by Arthur Byron Cover was published in a three-volume series.

- Rising Stars Book 1: Born in Fire (ISBN 978-0743435123) follows the storyline of the trade paperback of the same title.
- Rising Stars Book 2: Ten Years After (ISBN 978-0743452762) follows the storyline of Power.
- Rising Stars Book 3: Change the World (ISBN 978-1416504320) concludes the trilogy and follows the storyline of Fire and Ash.

== Reception and analysis ==
The series has been described as one of the comic book series created in the wake of works such as Frank Miller's The Dark Knight Returns and Alan Moore and Dave Gibbons Watchmen that "heeded [their] call to reframe and reformulate the tale of the superhero", drawing from noir genre and portraying more complex and less ideal superheroes.

The TV show Heroes that debuted in 2006 has been described as having a very similar setting, which led to some discussion of whether it was plagiarizing ideas from the Rising Stars. Heroes creator, Tim Kring, addressed this directly by stating that he has never read Rising Stars, and that he purposefully refused to familiarize himself with a number of superhero-related works to avoid such accusations of improper inspiration.
