= Dream Police (disambiguation) =

Dream Police may refer to:

- Dream Police, a 1979 album by Cheap Trick
- "Dream Police" (song), a 1979 song by Cheap Trick
- Dream Police (comics), a comic by J. Michael Straczynski
- Dream Police (Scottish band), a Scottish rock band established in 1968
- Dream Police (Norwegian band), a Norwegian rock band established in 1989
- "The Dream Police", a Gary Numan song produced in 1978 from Tubeway Army
- The Dream Police, a collection of poetry by Dennis Cooper
