= Battle Chasers: Nightwar =

2017 role-playing game

- Developer: Airship Syndicate
- Publisher: THQ Nordic
- Directors: Joe Madureira; Ryan Stefanelli
- Designers: Steve Madureira; Hakan Borazanci
- Programmers: Christopher S. Brooks; Andrew Nguyen; Andres Ortiz Suarez
- Artist: Grace Liu
- Writer: Joe Madureira
- Composers: Jesper Kyd; Clark Powell
- Engine: Unity
- Platforms: macOS; Microsoft Windows; PlayStation 4; Xbox One; Nintendo Switch; Linux; Android; iOS
- Release: October 3, 2017: Nintendo Switch; WW: May 15, 2018; Linux; WW: May 28, 2018; Android, iOS; WW: August 1, 2019
- Genre: Role-playing
- Mode: Single-player

Battle Chasers: Nightwar is a turn-based role-playing video game developed by Airship Syndicate and published by THQ Nordic. It was released in October 2017 for Microsoft Windows, macOS, PlayStation 4 and Xbox One, and in May 2018 for Nintendo Switch and Linux. Based on the Battle Chasers fantasy comic book series by Joe Madureira, the game involves the cast of that series being marooned on an island and being forced to stop the plans of an evil sorceress in order to escape.

The game received positive reviews from critics, who cited the game's graphics and visual style as a strong point, but criticized its difficulty balance and high level of grinding.

== Plot ==
The main cast of characters include Garrison, a brooding swordsman, Calibretto, a kindhearted war golem, Red Monika, a rogue, Knolan, an old wisecracking mage, and Gully, a young girl with a pair of magical gauntlets who is searching for her father. When the airship of the game's main characters is shot down over a mysterious island, they are forced to contend with a large group of ne'er-do-wells who are flocking there due to the discovery of a motherlode of mana. This includes Destra, an evil sorceress.

== Gameplay ==
Players explore the game's overworld in linear fashion, fighting enemies at set instances, until they enter a dungeon, where they explore in an isometric view that has been compared to Diablo. There, they can fight enemies, and dodge traps using special abilities. During battle, the game features an "overcharge" mechanic, where using non-magical attacks generates "overcharge" that can be used in place of mana. The player can set the difficulty of dungeons before entering, and completing dungeons at higher difficulties results in receiving more experience points.

== Development ==
Battle Chasers: Nightwar was the first game developed by Airship Syndicate, a company formed of former Vigil Games staff. Though Airship are based in the United States, the game is a traditional Japanese role-playing game, with some additions such as procedurally generated dungeons. The game was part-funded through a Kickstarter crowdfunding campaign, raising $856,354 towards its development in October 2015.

== Reception ==
Reception

Aggregate score
| Aggregator | Score |
|---|---|
| Metacritic | PC: 78/100; PS4: 75/100; XONE: 84/100; NS: 80/100 |

Review scores
| Publication | Score |
|---|---|
| Destructoid | 8/10 |
| Electronic Gaming Monthly | 4/5 |
| Game Informer | 7.75/10 |
| GameSpot | 6/10 (NS) 8/10 |
| IGN | 8/10 |
| Nintendo Life | 8/10 |
| Nintendo World Report | 8.5/10 |
| PC Gamer (US) | 81/100 |
| Polygon | 8/10 |
| Push Square | 8/10 |
| RPGamer | 4.5/5 |
| RPGFan | 95/100 |

Battle Chasers: Nightwar received positive reviews, with an aggregate score of 78/100 on Metacritic for the Microsoft Windows version.

Rich Meister of Destructoid rated the game 8/10, calling it "fun and visually striking", but criticized a jump in difficulty that led to grinding as the player got deeper into the game. Bryan Vitale of RPG Site also rated it 8/10, calling the narrative and gameplay unoriginal but saying that it is more than the sum of its parts due to its novel presentation. TJ Hafer of IGN similarly rated the game 8/10, saying that it is a "skillfully modernized" retro-style RPG, but criticizing the characters as "two-dimensional", saying that character development was lacking and that they did not "grow, evolve, or face personal adversity".
