= Fiona Avery =

American novelist

- Born: September 13, 1974 (age 52)
- Occupation: Writer

Fiona Kai Avery (born September 13, 1974) is an American comic book and television writer and novelist. Avery was hired as a reference editor for the fifth season of Babylon 5 and later continued in that role for the spin-off Crusade. Avery contributed several scripts for the series, including "The Well of Forever" and "Patterns of the Soul", as well as the unfilmed "Value Judgements" and "Tried and True". Following the cancellation of Crusade, Avery turned to comic book writing, working for Marvel and Top Cow on titles including The Amazing Spider-Man and Tomb Raider. Her more recent work includes three spin-offs of J. Michael Straczynski's Rising Stars (Bright, Voices of the Dead, and Untouchable) as well as Araña, the character created by Avery for Marvel.

== Bibliography ==
=== Marvel Comics ===
- X-Men:
  - Uncanny X-Men Annual '00: "Share" (with Esad Ribić, 2000) collected in X-Men: Eve of Destruction (hc, 808 pages, 2008, ISBN 1-302-91825-7)
    - Scripted by Avery, plotted by Scott Lobdell.
  - Icons: Rogue #1–4 (with Aaron Lopresti, 2001–2002)
- Spider-Man:
  - Peter Parker: Spider-Man Annual '01: "It's Good to be King" (with Juan Santacruz, 2001)
  - The Amazing Spider-Man (co-written by Avery and J. Michael Straczynski, art by John Romita, Jr.):
    - The Amazing Spider-Man by J. Michael Straczynski Omnibus Volume 1 (hc, 1,120 pages, 2019, ISBN 1-302-91706-4) includes:
      - The Amazing Spider-Man vol. 2 #55–56 (2003) also collected in Ultimate Collection: The Amazing Spider-Man by J. Michael Straczynski Volume 2 (tpb, 416 pages, 2009, ISBN 0-7851-3894-3)
      - The Amazing Spider-Man #503–505 (2004) also collected in Ultimate Collection: The Amazing Spider-Man by J. Michael Straczynski Volume 3 (tpb, 408 pages, 2010, ISBN 0-7851-3895-1)
  - Amazing Fantasy vol. 2 #1–6: "Araña" (with Mark Brooks and Roger Cruz (#3–4), 2004–2005) collected as Araña: The Heart of the Spider (digest-sized tpb, 144 pages, 2005, ISBN 0-7851-1506-4)
  - Araña: Heart of the Spider (with Roger Cruz, Francis Portela (#7–8, 10), Jonboy Meyers (#11–12), Marvel Next, 2005–2006) collected as:
    - In the Beginning (collects #1–6, digest-sized tpb, 144 pages, 2005, ISBN 0-7851-1506-4)
    - Night of the Hunter (collects #7–12, digest-sized tpb, 144 pages, 2006, ISBN 0-7851-1506-4)

=== Top Cow Productions ===
- Tomb Raider Archives Volume 4 (hc, 488 pages, Dark Horse, 2018, ISBN 1-5067-0354-2) includes:
  - Tomb Raider: Journeys #1–12 (with Drew Johnson, Gerardo Sandoval (#4), Manny Clarke and Mun Kao Tan (#8 and 12), 2001–2003)
  - Tomb Raider #0 (with Brian Ching, 2001)
  - Tomb Raider: Arabian Nights (with Billy Tan, one-shot, 2004)
- No Honor #1–4 (with Clayton Crain, 2001) collected as No Honor (tpb, 112 pages, 2003, ISBN 1-58240-321-X)
- Witchblade: Obakemono (with Billy Tan, graphic novel, 80 pages, 2002, ISBN 1-58240-259-0)
- Rising Stars Compendium (hc, 1,008 pages, 2009, ISBN 1-60706-032-9; tpb, 2009, ISBN 1-58240-802-5) includes:
  - Rising Stars: Bright #1–3 (with Dan Jurgens, 2003) also collected in Rising Stars: Voices of the Dead and Bright (tpb, 226 pages, 2006, ISBN 1-58240-613-8)
  - Rising Stars: Voices of the Dead #1–6 (with Staz Johnson and Al Rio (#5–6), 2005) also collected in Rising Stars: Voices of the Dead and Bright (tpb, 226 pages, 2006, ISBN 1-58240-613-8)
  - Rising Stars: Untouchable #1–5 (with Brent Anderson, 2006) also collected in Rising Stars: Visitations and Untouchable (tpb, 208 pages, 2007, ISBN 1-58240-268-X)
- Cursed #1–4 (co-written by Avery and Tippi Blevins, art by Romano Molenaar, 2003–2004)

=== Other publishers ===
- ThunderCats: Hammerhand's Revenge #1–5 (with Carlos D'Anda, Wildstorm, 2003–2004) collected as ThunderCats: Hammerhand's Revenge (tpb, 128 pages, 2004, ISBN 1-4012-0297-7)
- Lucky Bamboo Presents: "Hellfire" (with Billy Tan) — "The Way of the Sword" (with Romano Molenaar) — "Sam Falcon" (with Len DiSalvo, self-published one-shot, 2005)
- The Crown Rose (prose novel — fictionalized account of the life of Saint Isabelle of France, 454 pages, Pyr, 2005, ISBN 1-59102-312-2)

== Filmography ==
- Crusade:
  - 1.03 — The Well of Forever, 1999.
  - 1.05 — Patterns of the Soul, 1999.
- Earth: Final Conflict:
  - 4.08 — Essence, 2000.
