= Crusade (TV series) =

Spin-off TV show from J. Michael Straczynski's Babylon 5

- Crusade series launch poster
- Genre: Space opera; Drama
- Created by: J. Michael Straczynski
- Starring: Gary Cole; Tracy Scoggins; Daniel Dae Kim; Peter Woodward; Marjean Holden; Carrie Dobro
- Country of origin: United States
- No. of seasons: 1
- No. of episodes: 13

Production
- Running time: 45 minutes per episode
- Production companies: Babylonian Productions; Warner Bros. Television

Original release
- Network: TNT
- Release: June 9 – September 1, 1999

Related
- Babylon 5; The Legend of the Rangers

Crusade is an American spin-off television series from J. Michael Straczynski's Babylon 5, airing on TNT from June 9 to September 1, 1999. It is set in 2267, five years after the events of Babylon 5, and just after the movie A Call to Arms. The Drakh have released a nanovirus plague on Earth, which will destroy all life on Earth within five years if it is not stopped. The Victory class destroyer Excalibur has been sent out to look for anything that could help the search for a cure.

== Production background ==
Like Babylon 5, Crusade was intended to have a five-year story arc, although as Straczynski notes in the DVD commentary for A Call to Arms, it was intended to resolve the Drakh plague after a season or two and move onto other storylines. Conflicts arose, however, between the producers and executives at TNT, and production was cancelled before the first episode was broadcast.

TNT's market research had indicated that the audience for Babylon 5 did not watch other TNT programming, and likewise TNT's main audience was not watching the show, making another related program unattractive to the network's management. Straczynski believes that the network's "interference" with the production was an attempt to get out of their contract by allowing them to argue that he failed to deliver the series they wanted.

Thirteen episodes were made and broadcast by TNT, with at least four more scripted. The Sci-Fi Channel attempted to pick up the show and continue production, but was unable to find room in its budget.

== Plot background ==
=== Drakh attack ===
In 2267, six years after the end of the Shadow War, the Drakh, a former ally of the Shadows, attempt to destroy the Earth with a leftover Shadow Planet Killer. Interstellar Alliance (ISA) president John Sheridan takes command of Excalibur and Victory and leads the EarthForce and ISA fleets to victory. During the battle, the Drakh release a viral weapon into Earth's atmosphere, infecting every living thing on the planet. In five years, the virus will become active and kill everything. Victory is destroyed in the battle, but Excalibur survives. Command is turned over to Captain Matthew Gideon who is given a mission: explore the galaxy to find either a cure, or an ally capable of producing one ("War Zone").

=== Telepath War ===
At some point between 2262 and 2267 (most likely in 2264, and just before Babylon 5: The Legend of the Rangers, which took place in 2265), a civil war broke out on Earth between the Psi Corps and a group of rogue telepaths, with mundanes (non-telepaths) caught in the middle. As a result of the war, the Psi Corps (which all telepaths had been forced by law to join) was disbanded and the laws were rewritten; telepaths were given limited rights and allowed back into society, including the military (e.g. Lt. Matheson in Crusade). Few telepaths have advanced very far because of how recent the war was and due to the common fear of telepaths. Telepaths are still banned from scanning others' thoughts without consent and are required to be "deep scanned" by powerful telepaths on a regular basis to ensure that they are not violating any laws ("The Well of Forever").

=== Mars independence ===
After the Earth Alliance Civil War in 2261, Earth joined the ISA. As promised by John Sheridan, Mars was granted independence since ISA laws required members to free any colony where the majority of colonists wanted independence ("Rising Star"). There is still resentment between the two sides ("Ruling from the Tomb"). Earth controls most of the information systems and resources in the Solar System and Earth-based corporations control much of the Mars economy ("Objects in Motion"). As a result, there is some hostility among Mars-born humans towards Terrans and many in EarthForce do not feel obligated to risk their lives to help Earth fight the plague.

=== Shadow technology ===
The galaxy is dealing with the Shadow technology legacy, which, among other things, includes the release of the plague on Earth by the Drakh, which is made out of Shadow technology, and Earthforce's use of it, which Gideon had to experience tragically ten years before.

== Cast ==
This is a list of season star cast members, as credited on the DVDs.

- Gary Cole as Captain Matthew Gideon: captain of Excalibur. He was specifically chosen by Interstellar Alliance president John Sheridan because he would be willing to take chances and would not let diplomacy get in the way of completing the mission.
- Tracy Scoggins as Captain Elizabeth Lochley: commanding officer of Babylon 5. She first encountered Gideon on Mars during an interstellar conference on the plague where she was heading security ("Ruling from the Tomb"). She and Gideon originally clashed due to similarities in personalities, but soon developed a relationship as casual lovers, ("The Rules of the Game"). She returned to Babylon 5 after the conference and appeared on a recurring basis.
- Daniel Dae Kim as Lieutenant John Matheson: second in command and P6 telepath (slightly stronger than a Commercial Telepath (P5)). He is considered to be a role model among human telepaths since no other has advanced so far in the EarthForce military. He served as Gideon's first officer on his previous assignment as well. He was assigned to Excalibur at the insistence of Gideon.
- David Allen Brooks as Max Eilerson: a successful archaeologist from Interplanetary Expeditions. He was a child prodigy and has a gift for understanding alien languages. He was not originally assigned to Excalibur but was recruited by Gideon during their encounter in "War Zone".
- Peter Woodward as Galen: a technomage, who had saved Gideon's life 10 years prior to the series ("The Path of Sorrows"). He was exiled from the technomages' order in 2267 after he helped Earth and the ISA fight the Drakh in the battle that resulted in Earth becoming infected with the plague (Babylon 5: A Call to Arms).
- Marjean Holden as Doctor Sarah Chambers: ship's medical officer. She was on Mars at the time of the Drakh attack and was willing to risk the plague to go home to Earth and be with her family and help, but was persuaded that her medical expertise could be put to better use by helping to find a cure.
- Carrie Dobro as Dureena Nafeel: a thief and last known survivor of her race (which was destroyed by the Drakh during the Shadow War). Along with Galen, she assisted the crew during the Drakh attack on Earth. After the attack she was held on Mars by EarthForce for further questioning, but was released when Gideon made her part of the crew.

== Episodes ==
The "correct" order of episodes is somewhat unclear and the episodes contain conflicting evidence as to the in-universe chronological order. Series creator J. Michael Straczynski revised TNT's ordering for re-broadcast on the Sci Fi Channel in April 2001 and the episodes have been repeated in this order on a number of occasions since then. "War Zone", an episode made halfway through the production as an opener, has been pushed near the end. In particular, these episodes ignore a discontinuity in uniforms – in the TNT order, the crew start out with the revised uniforms in production, and then in "Appearances and Other Deceits" were forced to change to the "new" uniforms used earlier in production. The fourteenth episode would have featured a return to the older uniforms that the crew prefer.

A third order was formally endorsed by Straczynski as the "true" chronological sequence of in-universe events for the filmed episodes, as it appeared in The Official Babylon 5 Chronology (published in the pages of The Official Babylon 5 Magazine in 1999–2000) and the book Across Time and Space: The Chronologies of Babylon 5. Here, "Babylon 5 Historical Database" author Terry Jones explains the running order was done to take into account Straczynski's desire to have the grey bellhop uniform stories incorporated within the black explorer uniform stories and the internal story continuity had the series continued. This also accounted for the various on-air dates given and the changes made to dialogue in "Each Night I Dream of Home". This particular ordering supersedes Straczynski's own "preferred" sequence from a strictly chronological and causal standpoint. The original broadcast order as set by TNT was used for the DVD releases.

A fourth, continuity-based order can be inferred by the events of the episodes themselves as several of the episodes make mini-arcs within the series; i.e. the continuity order of Gideon/Lochley meetings based on dialog is "Ruling from the Tomb"/"Each Night I Dream of Home"/"The Rules of the Game" which also requires "Ruling" to precede "Appearances and Other Deceits" while the continuity order of the nanite mask is "The Memory of War"/"Each Night I Dream of Home"/"Patterns of the Soul", etc.

=== Episode list ===
| No. | Title | Directed by | Written by | Original release date | Prod. code |
|---|---|---|---|---|---|
| 1 | "War Zone" | Janet Greek | J. Michael Straczynski | June 9, 1999 | 108 |
After the Drakh infect Earth with a plague, Captain Gideon is called to Earth and given a new assignment. Using the brand-new Interstellar Alliance deep range vessel Excalibur, he and his crew must search for any clues to a cure for the plague. If a cure is not found within five years, everyone on Earth will soon die.
| 2 | "The Long Road" | Mike Vejar | J. Michael Straczynski | June 16, 1999 | 107 |
Earth's strip mining of a peaceful planet causes an environmental hazard to the population, who have rejected technology in favor of a more traditional lifestyle. However matters are complicated when the local population begin taking hostages from the mining operation.
| 3 | "The Well of Forever" | Janet Greek | Fiona Avery | June 23, 1999 | 106 |
Galen takes control of Excalibur and goes in search of a mysterious place in hyperspace known as the "Well of Forever", where he claims "powerful energies intersect". However, it is revealed that Galen has more personal reason to search for the Well. This episode also features creatures native to hyperspace: large, jellyfish-like, passive creatures.
| 4 | "The Path of Sorrows" | Mike Vejar | J. Michael Straczynski | June 30, 1999 | 109 |
On a world rumored to be a place of healing, the crew of Excalibur find an alien that acts as a confessor for passing travelers.
| 5 | "Patterns of the Soul" | Tony Dow | Fiona Avery | July 7, 1999 | 110 |
The crew travel to a world named Theta 49 to investigate the possibility that the Drakh plague may have spread beyond Earth.
| 6 | "Ruling From the Tomb" | John Copeland | Peter David | July 14, 1999 | 111 |
On a visit to Mars, the crew encounter the "Sacred Omega" doomsday cult. The cult plants a bomb at an antiplague action conference in the belief that judgement day is soon.
| 7 | "The Rules of the Game" | Jesus Trevino | J. Michael Straczynski | July 21, 1999 | 112 |
Gideon comes to Babylon 5 to try to negotiate a deal with the residents of Lorka 7, a world that may hold medical secrets useful in trying to cure the Drakh plague.
| 8 | "Appearances and Other Deceits" | Stephen Furst | J. Michael Straczynski | July 28, 1999 | 113 |
Two EarthGov representatives arrive to improve the ship's image when an alien being spread through people by touch arrives on the ship.
| 9 | "Racing the Night" | Mike Vejar | J. Michael Straczynski | August 4, 1999 | 103 |
The crew visits a planet once home to a civilization wiped out by the same plague as the one the Drakh left on Earth. They are surprised to find all the buildings still perfectly intact, but then motion is detected in the ancient city.
| 10 | "The Memory of War" | Tony Dow | J. Michael Straczynski | August 11, 1999 | 102 |
The crew visits a planet where the inhabitants were wiped out in a war 100 years ago.
| 11 | "The Needs of Earth" | Mike Vejar | J. Michael Straczynski | August 18, 1999 | 101 |
The crew rescue an individual whom the Rangers claim possesses all the important information of his race on six data crystals.
| 12 | "Visitors From Down the Street" | Jerry Apoian | J. Michael Straczynski | August 25, 1999 | 104 |
Excalibur detects a distress call and picks up a saucer-shaped life pod. Although never having seen the race before, the two individuals inside claim humans have corrupted their government and ruined lives on their homeworld. This episode can for many reasons be viewed as a satirical appreciation of the X-Files franchise, but from an inverted alien Mulder and Scully perspective including the basic character and costume designs.
| 13 | "Each Night I Dream of Home" | Stephen Furst | J. Michael Straczynski | September 1, 1999 | 105 |
A Warlock-class destroyer drops off two passengers onto Excalibur with instructions to take them to Earth. On the way, the crew take a risk by stopping to rescue a Starfury and Elizabeth Lochley. On arrival at Earth, they are greeted from a lifepod isolated in the medbay by Doctor Stephen Franklin.

=== Unfilmed episodes ===
When production was suspended, planning for the episodes that would have made up the second half of the season was at various stages: three had completed scripts and a number of others were ready for scripting with titles and story outlines.

| No. | Title | Written by |
|---|---|---|
| 14 | "To the Ends of the Earth" | J. Michael Straczynski |
The Apocalypse Box directs Gideon to a ship like the one that destroyed Cerberus. This episode further expanded on the story of the unidentified black craft seen in Gideon's flashbacks.
| 15 | "Value Judgments" | Fiona Avery |
The crew of Excalibur discovers a vault with a lock that requires a telepath to open it. This episode expanded on the fate of the Psi Corps and would have seen the return of Bester.
| 16 | "Darkness of the Soul" | J. Michael Straczynski |
Episode involving the Apocalypse Box. Scripting was about to begin when the series was cancelled.
| 17 | "Tried and True" | Fiona Avery |
Dureena is imprisoned and interrogated by her mentor Nafeek as to what she is doing on Excalibur. This episode was intended as a standalone "coming of age" story for Dureena, not connected to a story arc.
| 18 | TBA | J. Michael Straczynski |
Episode would have involved the discovery of a construction base. Only exists as a one-line description.
| 19 | "War Story" | Richard Mueller |
Dureena is abducted by an unknown ship under circumstances that leave Matheson feeling as though he's responsible.
| 20 | "The Walls of Hell" | Larry DiTillio |
In attempt to rescue Dureena, Matheson gets possessed by the apocalypse box and subsequently takes over the ship.
| 21 | TBA | J. Michael Straczynski |
Dureena returns with a magical sword and without any memory of what happened to her.
| 22 | "The End of the Line" | J. Michael Straczynski |
Gideon learns of the origins of the ship that destroyed Cerberus, and of a conspiracy at the heart of the Earth Alliance. This was to have been the season finale, with a major cliffhanger leading into Season 2.

The completed scripts of "To The Ends of the Earth", "Value Judgements", and "End of the Line" were published online for a period during 2001 on bookface.com.

A script written by Peter Woodward for the second season entitled "Little Bugs Have Lesser Bugs" was published in 2011 as part of the Other Voices Volume 1 collection. Scripts for three further episodes, "Value Judgments", "Tried and True", and "War Story" were included in Other Voices Volume 2, also published in 2011.

== Home releases ==
The complete series was released as a four-disc set in 2004, almost five years after the series ended and a few months after the final season and movie set of Babylon 5 was released. Crusade was also included in Babylon 5: The Complete Universe, a set of all B5 shows and movies released in the United Kingdom on October 24, 2005. It was not included in Babylon 5: The Complete Television Series, which was a set released in the United States.

The episodes are in the original broadcast order. The set does not include the pilot movie, A Call to Arms, which was released earlier as part of the movie set. Unlike Babylon 5, the DVD release of Crusade was not cropped and re-edited for widescreen; it maintains its original fullscreen format. Initially, the set included a commentary with Straczynski, however he got it removed from subsequent pressings when he learned that parts of it had been replaced with an entirely different interview to cover up his harsh criticism of TNT.

| DVD name | Region 1 | Region 2 |
|---|---|---|
| Crusade: The Complete Series | December 7, 2004 | March 28, 2005 |
| Babylon 5: The Complete Television Series | August 17, 2004 | N/A |
| Babylon 5: The Complete Universe | N/A | October 24, 2005 |

== See also ==
- Space Battleship Yamato, a TV show with a similar premise about fixing up Earth
