= Midnight Nation =

American comic book

- Cover to the collected edition.

Publication information
- Publisher: Joe's Comics
- Schedule: Monthly
- Format: limited series
- Publication date: October 2000 – July 2002
- No. of issues: 12 regular issues, one special (#½)
- Main character(s): David Grey; Laurel

Creative team
- Written by: J. Michael Straczynski
- Penciller(s): Gary Frank
- Inker(s): Johnathan Sibal; Jason Gorder; Jay Leisten
- Colorist(s): Matt Milla

Midnight Nation is a religious-themed twelve-issue American comic book limited series created by J. Michael Straczynski and published from 2000 to 2002 by Top Cow Productions under their Joe's Comics imprint. It is about a man who is killed, in a sense, and is on a journey to save his soul.

== Synopsis ==
Los Angeles police officer Lieutenant David Grey encounters a brutal murder. When he tracks down a possible lead he encounters strange, goblin-like men who attack him. When he awakes, Grey finds himself in a hospital, and those around him have become translucent and can no longer see him. It is explained to him by his mysterious guide Laurel that he has lost his soul and he has now been plunged into a shadow world that runs parallel to our own, filled with people who were forgotten by the world and "fell through the cracks".

David is told that without his soul he will slowly become like "the Walkers", the monstrous people he encountered who attacked him. David must travel on foot to New York City where "The Other Guy" (devil) holds his soul. Laurel has guided many others on the same journey before, but none have survived the trip.

Along the way David encounters various tests, such as fighting these Walkers, meeting his future self, slowly losing his mind and his sense of self, and finally falling in love with Laurel, who is not in fact human. He also saves his ex-wife (who had walked out on him years earlier due to his unwavering dedication to his job as a police officer) from the Walkers. He also encounters an enigmatic old man who seems immune to the Walkers attacks and has no fear of them, and is able to drive them away in terror. It is later revealed that he is Lazarus who has been waiting for the return of Jesus Christ since Jesus Christ told him to do so. He is currently watched over by an angel wielding a flaming sword.

When David finally reaches New York, the Other Guy begins to lecture him on things such as life, hope, God, and humanity. He tells him that hope is a lie and that he intends to increase misery around the world until all of humanity becomes like the abandoned and forgotten people he met on his trip through the parallel world. When that is done, he can recreate the world as he sees fit. He then forces David to feel all the suffering humanity has felt over its existence, which causes him to go insane and run through the streets as one of the Walkers. He sees a mannequin that resembles Laurel in a shop window, and returns to the citadel, finding Laurel being nailed to a circular wooden board.

The Other Guy tells him that Laurel was lying to him about his soul: if he recovers it he will become one of the Walkers; if he does not, he will cease to belong to either world. The Other Guy also informs him that if he gives his soul to Laurel, she will cease to be an agent of God (for that is what she truly is), she will be reborn as a human. David pushes his soul into Laurel, and is drawn back into the real world, where he is transported to a hospital and eventually reunited with his estranged wife. He discovers he has the ability to still perceive people who have fallen through the cracks, and eventually is taken by Lazarus to the meeting with his past self, and then to a meeting with the reborn Laurel, now a happy teenage girl.

== Collected editions ==
The comic ran for 12 issues, along with one one-shot story (a Wizard #1/2 edition), and was collected as a softcover trade paperback in 2003 (ISBN 1582402728).

A deluxe, oversized hardcover edition was released in 2009. It includes Midnight Nation #1-12, the Wizard #1/2 issue, a cover gallery, and extras such as a script, layout page, and super-gloss poster (ISBN 978-1607060406).

== TV adaptation ==
In July 2016, Bleeding Cool reported that Straczynski was producing a TV series with Gale Anne Hurd and was writing the pilot script.

== See also ==
- The Book of Lost Souls, a Marvel/Icon title in which Straczynski explores themes similar to those of Midnight Nation.
