= Liquid! =

- Founded: 1996
- Founders: Aron Lusen, Christian Lichtner

Liquid!, a.k.a. Liquid Graphics, is a firm which has had employees work as colorists in the comics industry. It was established by Aron Lusen and Christian Lichtner in 1996.

== Awards ==
- 1997: Won for "Favorite Colorist" Wizard Fan Awards
- 1998: Won "Favorite Colorist" Wizard Fan Awards
- 1999:
  - Won "Favorite Colorist" Wizard Fan Awards, for Uncanny X-Men
  - Nominated for "Best Coloring" Eisner Award, for Battle Chasers
  - Second in "Favorite Colorist" Comics Buyer's Guide Awards
- 2000:
  - Won "Favorite Colorist" Wizard Fan Awards, for X-Men and Fantastic Four
  - Nominated for "Favourite Comics Artist (colouring)" Eagle Award
  - Second in "Favorite Colorist" Comics Buyer's Guide Awards
- 2001: Nominated for "Favourite Colourist" Eagle Award
