= The Book of Lost Souls =

American comic book series by J. Michael Straczynski

- Cover of the TPB

Publication information
- Publisher: Marvel Comics
- Publication date: December 2005
- No. of issues: 6
- Main character(s): Jonathan; Mystery; Dark Man

Creative team
- Created by: J. Michael Straczynski; Colleen Doran

The Book of Lost Souls is an American dark fantasy comic book series by J. Michael Straczynski with art by Colleen Doran and published under the Icon Comics imprint, owned by Marvel Comics.

The comic follows Jonathan, a man who lived over a century ago who was transported to the 21st century during an attempted suicide. His new life involves supernatural mysteries and enigmatic characters such as a talking cat named Mystery and the Dark Man, whose plans for Jonathan are unclear. Jonathan is given the power to "save" the Lost, those individuals who have lost all hope in their lives.

The Dark Man may be God or the Devil, and it is, as yet, unclear which one he may be. An individual the Dark Man wants saved may be working for either, depending on anyone's point of view.

== Story arcs ==
=== Introductions All Around ===
Issue one: Jonathan meets Mystery and the Dark Man. Before jumping off a bridge a man gives him a book, the first three lines are:

Your name

The words that brought you here:

The words that will release you:

Jonathan writes his name and "All love is unrequited. Haven't you heard?". Mystery tells him to leave the last line blank for now. Jonathan and Mystery start looking for "The lost".

=== Dragons in the Dishwater ===
Issue two: Jonathan and Mystery help a housewife named Mary who is lost in daydreams: she is a princess and her abusive husband is a dragon. After she finds out that he is having an extramarital affair, Jonathan says that she has one of two choices: let the dragon (the husband) kill her, or kill the dragon (the husband) herself. Jonathan then gives the wife a gun. She confronts her husband but chooses not to kill him, but manages in the sparing of his life, to save herself by losing her fear of him.

=== The Insufficiency of Rain ===
Issue three: Jonathan encounters a homeless artist whose boyfriend, Lee died of a drug overdose. After his death she makes a Fresco of him on an alley wall. Jonathan and Mystery help her find hope and love in the memory of Lee, and also help her to say good bye to the man she loved.

=== No Way out ===
Issue four to five: Jonathan meets with the Dark Man who says a Mob hitman named Quint is his. After Quint kills the wrong man in a hit, he asks a man with no eyes who knows Mystery for a new life. Jonathan, Mystery, Quint and his hostage, Theo, travel onto The Endless Road towards Quint's new life and new identity. On the road however Jonathan decides not to save Quint, as the Dark Man ordered. The souls of the people Quint previously killed eventually attack Quint, leading him to take his own life on The Road. Jonathan is punished by the Dark Man when he returns to the Dark Man's realm, and emerges announcing that he and the Dark Man are now at war, and forever shall be.

=== The Mystery Of ===
Issue six: Mystery tells a young woman his life story. This story introduces Raphael, a "man" looking for forgiveness that will never come.

== Trade paperback ==
- Book of Lost Souls Vol. I (collects #1-6; ISBN 0-7851-1940-X)
