= J. Michael Straczynski =

American writer and filmmaker (born 1954)

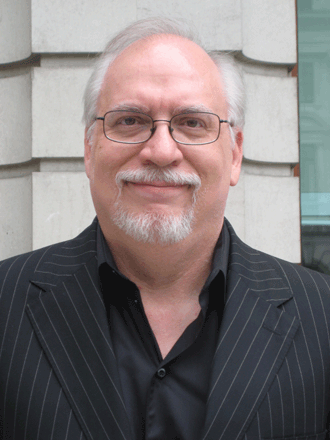
- Straczynski in 2008
- Born: Joseph Michael Straczynski; July 17, 1954 (age 72); Paterson, New Jersey, U.S.
- Education: Southwestern College (AA); San Diego State University (BA)
- Occupations: Screenwriter; producer; director; comic book writer
- Years active: 1979–present
- Spouse: Kathryn M. Drennan (m. 1983; div. 2003)

Joseph Michael Straczynski (/strəˈzɪnski/; born July 17, 1954) is an American entertainment creator, filmmaker, and motion picture producer. He is also a writer of numerous comic books. He was the founder of Synthetic Worlds Ltd. and Studio JMS. Straczynski was the creator of the science fiction television series Babylon 5 (1993–1998) and its spinoff Crusade (1999), as well as the series Jeremiah (2002–2004) and Sense8 (2015–2018). Straczynski is also the executor of the estate of Harlan Ellison.

Straczynski wrote the psychological drama film Changeling (2008) and was co-writer on the martial arts thriller Ninja Assassin (2009). He was one of the key writers for Marvel's Thor (2011), the horror film Underworld: Awakening (2012), and the apocalyptic horror film World War Z (2013).

From 2001 to 2007, Straczynski wrote Marvel Comics' The Amazing Spider-Man, followed by writing issues of Thor and Fantastic Four. He is the author of the Superman: Earth One trilogy of graphic novels, and he has written Superman, Wonder Woman, and Before Watchmen for DC Comics. Straczynski is the creator and writer of several original comic book series such as Rising Stars, Midnight Nation, Dream Police, and Ten Grand through Joe's Comics.

A prolific writer across a variety of media, as well as a former journalist, Straczynski is the author of the autobiography Becoming Superman (2019) for HarperVoyager, the novel Together We Will Go (2021) for Simon & Schuster, the instructional Becoming a Writer, Staying a Writer (2021) for Benbella Books, and the novel The Glass Box (2024) for Blackstone Publishing. In 2020 he was named Head of the Creative Council for the comics publishing company Artists, Writers and Artisans.

Straczynski was a long-time participant in Usenet and other early computer networks, interacting with fans through various online forums (including GEnie, CompuServe, and America Online) since 1984. He is credited as being the first TV producer to directly engage with fans on the Internet and to allow viewer viewpoints to influence the look and feel of his show (see Babylon 5's use of the Internet). He was most known for his online presence on GEnie and the Usenet newsgroup rec.arts.sf.tv.babylon5.moderated.

== Early and personal life ==
Straczynski was born in Paterson, New Jersey, and is the son of Charles Straczynski, a manual laborer, and Evelyn Straczynski (née Pate). His father was an alcoholic and often violent to his family. His mother suffered from depression. He was raised in Newark, New Jersey; Kankakee, Illinois; Dallas, Texas; Chula Vista, California, where he graduated from high school; and San Diego, California. Straczynski's family religion was Catholic although he is an atheist. He has Polish ancestry and his grandparents lived in the area which today belongs to Belarus and fled to the United States from the Russian Revolution; his father was born in the United States and has lived in Poland, Germany and Russia.

Straczynski began his post-secondary education at Southwestern College, where he was mentored by Bill Virchis and received an Associate of Arts degree. (Additionally, the two-year institution later awarded him an honorary degree.) Thereafter, he transferred to nearby San Diego State University (SDSU), where he received a Bachelor of Arts degree with a double major in psychology and sociology (and minors in philosophy and literature). While at SDSU, he wrote for the student newspaper, The Daily Aztec.

Straczynski met Kathryn M. Drennan while they were at SDSU. They moved to Los Angeles in 1981, married in 1983, separated in 1999, and they were divorced in 2001.

Straczynski has Asperger syndrome. Straczynski had a voluntary vasectomy when he turned 21, and wrote about the experience in the January 28, 1983 edition of the Los Angeles Reader.

== Career ==
=== 1970s–1980s ===
==== Early work ====
Straczynski began writing plays, having several produced at Southwestern College and San Diego State University before publishing his adaptation of Snow White with Performance Publishing. Several other plays were produced around San Diego, including The Apprenticeship for the Marquis Public Theater. During the late 1970s, Straczynski became the on-air entertainment reviewer for KSDO-FM and wrote several radio plays before being hired as a scriptwriter for the radio drama Alien Worlds. He produced his first television project in San Diego, Marty Sprinkle for KPBS-TV as well as worked on the XETV-TV project Disasterpiece Theatre. He worked as a journalist for the Los Angeles Times as a special San Diego correspondent and worked for San Diego Magazine and The San Diego Reader, and wrote for the Los Angeles Herald-Examiner, the Los Angeles Reader, TV-Cable Week, and People magazine. Straczynski wrote The Complete Book of Scriptwriting for Writer's Digest. Published in 1982, the book is often used as a text in introductory screenwriting courses, and is in its third edition.

He spent five years from 1987 to 1992 co-hosting the Hour 25 radio talk show on KPFK-FM Los Angeles with Larry DiTillio. During his tenure, he interviewed John Carpenter, Neil Gaiman, Ray Bradbury, Harlan Ellison and other writers, producers, actors and directors. In 2000, Straczynski returned to radio drama with The City of Dreams for scifi.com.

==== Work in animation ====
Straczynski was a fan of the cartoon He-Man and the Masters of the Universe. He wrote a spec script in 1984 and sent it directly to Filmation. Filmation purchased his script and several others, and hired him on staff. During this time he became friends with Larry DiTillio, and when Filmation produced the He-Man spinoff She-Ra: Princess of Power, they worked as story editors on the show.

Straczynski and DiTillio worked to create an animated version of Elfquest, but that project fell through when CBS attempted to retool the show to appeal to younger audiences.

While working on Jayce and the Wheeled Warriors, Straczynski was hired to come aboard the Len Janson and Chuck Menville project to adapt the movie Ghostbusters to an animated version called The Real Ghostbusters. When Janson and Menville learned that there was not only a 13-episode order but a 65-episode syndication order as well, they decided that the workload was too much and that they would only work on their own scripts. DIC head Jean Chalopin asked Straczynski to take on the task of story editing the entire 78-episode block as well as writing his own scripts. After the show's successful first season, consultants were brought in to make suggestions for the show, including changing Janine to a more maternal character, giving every character a particular "job" (Peter is the funny one, Egon is the smart one, and Winston, the only black character, was to be the driver), and to add kids into the show. Straczynski left at this point, Janson and Menville resuming the story editing job for the second network season. Straczynski then began development on a show called Spiral Zone but left after only one script, taking his name off the series, because management drastically altered his conception of the show.

==== Live action and network shows ====
After leaving animation, Straczynski freelanced for The Twilight Zone writing an episode entitled "What Are Friends For" and, for Shelley Duvall's Nightmare Classics, adapting The Strange Case of Dr. Jekyll and Mr. Hyde, which was nominated for a Writer's Guild Award.

Straczynski was offered the position of story editor on the syndicated live-action science fiction series Captain Power and the Soldiers of the Future. Straczynski constructed a season long arc with lasting character changes and wrote a third of the scripts himself. After one season, the toy company Mattel demanded more input into the show, causing Straczynski to quit. He recommended DiTillio to take over the job as story editor for a second season, but the toy company financing fell through and that season was never produced.

Soon after, the 1988 Writers Guild of America strike began. Straczynski met Harlan Ellison during this time and later became friends with him. Straczynski is an executor of Ellison's collected works.

After the strike ended, the producers of the new Twilight Zone needed to create more episodes to be able to sell the series into syndication with a complete 65-episode package. They hired Straczynski as executive story editor to fill in the remaining number of needed episodes.

After leaving Twilight Zone, his agent of the time asked him to pitch for the show Jake and the Fatman. Initially wary, Straczynski finally did and was hired on as an executive story consultant under Jeri Taylor and David Moessinger. When Taylor and Moessinger left the show, Straczynski left too as an act of solidarity.

When Moessinger was hired as executive producer for Murder, She Wrote, he offered Straczynski a job as co-producer. Straczynski joined Murder, She Wrote for two seasons and wrote seven produced episodes. Moessinger and Straczynski moved the protagonist, Jessica Fletcher, from the sleepy Maine town of Cabot Cove to New York City to revitalize the show. The move effectively brought the show back into the top ten from the mid-thirties where it had fallen.

Straczynski wrote one episode of Walker, Texas Ranger for Moessinger between the pilot episode for Babylon 5 and the start of its first season.

Straczynski wrote an adaptation of Robert Louis Stevenson's The Strange Case of Dr. Jekyll and Mr. Hyde for the Showtime network, which was nominated for a Writers Guild of America award, and a Murder, She Wrote movie, Murder, She Wrote: A Story to Die For, which he produced.

=== 1990s ===
==== Babylon 5 and Crusade ====
In late 1991, Warner Bros. contracted with Straczynski and Doug Netter as partners to produce Babylon 5 as the flagship program for the new Prime Time Entertainment Network.

Straczynski and Netter hired many of the people from Captain Power, as well as hiring Ellison as a consultant and DiTillio as a story editor. Babylon 5 won two Emmy Awards, back-to-back Hugo Awards, and dozens of other awards. Straczynski wrote 92 of the 110 episodes, as well as the pilot and five television movies. The show is a character-driven space opera and features an intentional emphasis on realism in its portrayal of space operations. It pioneered extensive use of CGI for its special effects. Babylon 5 was produced and broadcast for five seasons completing Stracynski's planned story arc.

He wrote the outlines for nine of the canonical Babylon 5 novels, supervised the three produced Babylon 5 telefilm novelizations (In the Beginning, Thirdspace, and A Call to Arms), and is the author of four Babylon 5 short stories published in magazines, not yet reprinted (as of 2008).

In 2005, Straczynski began publishing his Babylon 5 scripts. This process ended in June 2008, with the scripts no longer being available from the end of July of that year. His scripts for the television movies were published for a limited time in January 2009.

==== Joe's Comics ====
Straczynski has long been a comic fan and began writing comics in the late 1980s. His work in comics includes the adaptations of Captain Power and the Soldiers of the Future, The Twilight Zone, Star Trek, and Babylon 5. In 1999 he created Rising Stars for Top Cow/Image Comics.

=== 2000s ===
==== Marvel Comics ====
Marvel Comics signed him to an exclusive contract, beginning with a run on The Amazing Spider-Man, from 2001 to 2007. He took over the series with Volume 2 issue #30 (cover dated June 2001). Straczynski and artist John Romita Jr. crafted an acclaimed story for The Amazing Spider-Man #36 (Dec. 2001) in response to the September 11 attacks. He wrote or co-wrote several major Spider-Man story arcs including "Spider-Man: The Other", "Back in Black", and the infamous "One More Day". He later wrote several other Marvel titles including Supreme Power, Strange, Fantastic Four, Thor, and mini-series featuring the Silver Surfer and a "What If" scenario, Bullet Points.

==== Jeremiah ====
Straczynski ran Jeremiah, loosely based on the Belgian post-apocalyptic comic Jeremiah, from 2002–2004. Straczynski ran the series for two seasons but was frustrated with the conflicting directions that MGM and Showtime wanted from the show, and even used the pseudonym "Fettes Grey" for the first time since Spiral Zone on one of the scripts. In the second season, Straczynski decided to leave the show if things did not improve, and the show ended after two seasons.

==== Changeling ====
Straczynski wrote Changeling, a psychological drama film based partly on the "Wineville Chicken Coop" kidnapping and murder case in Los Angeles, California. Directed by Clint Eastwood, produced by Ron Howard, and starring Angelina Jolie, the film premiered in 2008 and subsequently received eight nominations for the BAFTA Award, including a nomination for Best Original Screenplay. The first draft script was written in eleven days, after Straczynski figured out "how to tell" the story, which ended up being the shooting draft, after Eastwood declined to make any changes. It was optioned immediately by Howard, who at first intended to direct the film but later stepped down after scheduling conflicts.

At first, Straczynski expressed disbelief at the story, but spent a year researching the case, compiling over six thousands pages of documentation. Straczynski claimed that 95% of the script's content came from the historical record, and went through the script with Universal Studios's legal department, providing attribution for every scene so the film would be described as "a true story" rather than "based on" one. On how his journalistic background helped him write the film, Straczynski stated:

It was hugely important. Usually, when you're asked to tell a true story in film, there's already an article or something where the legwork's been done. In this case, there was nothing available. It was all primary research—City Hall archives, county courthouse archives, criminal records, hospital records. I just sifted through stuff, often spending a whole day paging through records just to find one reference.

==== Feature screenwriter ====
Straczynski announced on February 23, 2007, that he had been hired to write the feature film adaptation of Max Brooks's novel World War Z for Paramount Pictures and production company Plan B Entertainment, taking screen story credit on the finished film.

In 2008, Straczynski wrote a draft of Ninja Assassin for Joel Silver, which he completed in just 53 hours. The film was produced by The Wachowskis and released on November 25, 2009.

Straczynski is credited as "story writer" along with Mark Protosevich for the 2011 film, Thor. He makes a cameo appearance in the film, his first appearance in a movie and his second appearance as an actor (the first being "Sleeping in Light", the final episode of Babylon 5). Straczynski was part of the writers room (along with Terry Rossio, Patrick McKay, J. D. Payne, Lindsey Beer, Cat Vasko, T. S. Nowlin, and Jack Paglen) to develop Godzilla vs. Kong, though was uncredited on the final script.

==== DC Comics ====
When his exclusive contract with Marvel ended, he was announced as the writer for a run on The Brave and the Bold for DC Comics. He collaborated with artist Shane Davis on an out-of-continuity original graphic novel starring Superman titled Superman: Earth One. The story features a young Superman and focus on his decision about the role he wants to assume in life. On March 8, 2010, it was announced he would be taking over writing duties for the monthly Superman title with a story arc entitled "Grounded", and the Wonder Woman title, beginning with issues 701 and 601 respectively. Less than a year later he was asked by DC to step away from both titles in order to concentrate on the second volume of Superman: Earth One and handed them over to Chris Roberson and Phil Hester to finish his Superman and Wonder Woman stories respectively. In 2012, Straczynski wrote Before Watchmen: Dr. Manhattan drawn by Adam Hughes and Before Watchmen: Nite Owl drawn by Andy Kubert and Joe Kubert. A second volume of Superman: Earth One was released later that same year.

At San Diego Comic-Con in 2015, DC Comics announced The Flash: Earth One, a new graphic novel of its Earth One line to be written by Straczynski, set to be published in 2016. As of 2023, it has still not been published.

=== 2010s ===
Straczynski's Julius Schwartz Lecture at Massachusetts Institute of Technology, November 2015

=== Studio JMS ===
In July 2012, J. Michael Straczynski announced the launch of Studio JMS to produce TV series, movies, comics and, in the future, games and web series. On March 27, 2013, Netflix announced they would produce the show Sense8 with Studio JMS and The Wachowskis, which aired on June 5, 2015, and earned a season 2 announcement by August 10, 2015.

==== Joe's Comics revival ====
The Joe's Comics line was revived at Image Comics in 2013 with the launch of Ten Grand drawn by Ben Templesmith and Sidekick drawn by Tom Mandrake.

Dynamite Entertainment announced in July 2013 a new 12 issue The Twilight Zone comic book series penned by Straczynski. The series ran for its projected 12 issues, from December 2013 to February 2015, with art by Guiu Vilanova. Straczynski was announced as the writer of Terminator Salvation: The Final Battle, a 12 issue comic book series from Dark Horse Comics, along with artist Pete Woods.

==== Sense8 ====
Sense8, a science fiction television series created by Straczynski and The Wachowskis was ordered straight-to-series by Netflix in March 2013. Sense8's first season debuted in June 2015 on Netflix, from Studio JMS and Georgeville Television. Straczynski executive produced and co-wrote all 12 episodes of the first season with fellow creators, executive producers, and directors Lilly and Lana Wachowski. In August 2015, Netflix renewed Sense8 for a second season.

=== 2020s ===
==== Artists Writers and Artisans ====
In 2020, Straczynski was named head of the Creative Council for the new comics publishing company AWA, where he was responsible for creating the shared universe used by many of its writers.

Following the publication of his autobiography Becoming Superman in 2019 from HarperVoyager, the novel Together We Will Go was published in 2021 by Simon & Schuster's Scout Press, and the instructional Becoming A Writer, Staying A Writer was published in 2021 by Benbella Books. In 2024 he published the novel The Glass Box (2024) Blackstone Publishing.

==== Return to Babylon 5 ====
In 2022, Straczynski announced that a reboot of his series Babylon 5 was in the works at The CW, with the pilot script written by him. Following a buy-out of the CW by NextStar and strike action by the WGA, work on the project was stalled.

In 2023, it was announced by Straczynski that a fully animated Babylon 5 feature film, Babylon 5: The Road Home, had been produced in secret and was scheduled for release in the summer of that year, reunited the surviving members of the original cast. It was released in August 2023.

==== Return to Marvel Comics ====
Across 2021 and 2022, Straczynski contributed short stories to several anthology and milestone editions of comics published by Marvel Comics, this led to him writing a mystery six issue event mini-series for the publisher. In June 2023, it was announced Straczynski would write the next volume of Captain America, beginning in September of that year. Straczynski also returned to the Spider-Man franchise around this time, contributing a short story to the anthology mini-series Spider-Man: Black Suit & Blood as well as penning guest appearances by the character in storylines for Captain America.

In October of 2024, Straczynski confirmed on social media that he would be departing Captain America in December of that year, while the mystery six-part event announced some years back was ultimately revealed that same month as being an anthology series pairing up two different 'unlikely' Marvel characters per issue.

Strazynski would announce in spring of 2025 that he would be returning to Spider-Man to pen a five-issue mini-series, The Amazing Spider-Man: Torn, set during Peter Parker's days spent at Empire State University with Gwen Stacy, Mary Jane Watson, and Harry Osborn. The book would launch in October.

== Unrealized projects ==
In 2004, Straczynski was approached by Paramount Studios to become a producer of the Star Trek: Enterprise series. He declined, believing that he would not be allowed to take the show in the direction he felt it should go. He did write a treatment for a new Star Trek series with colleague Bryce Zabel.

After both Babylon 5 and Jeremiah ended, Straczynski transitioned to working as a feature film screenwriter. In 2006, he was hired to write a feature film based on the story of King David for Universal by producers Erwin Stoff and Akiva Goldsman. In June 2007, it was announced that Straczynski had written a feature screenplay for the Silver Surfer movie for Fox, the production of which would depend on the success of the Fantastic Four: Rise of the Silver Surfer. Additionally, he has written a script for Tom Hanks' Playtone Productions and Universal Pictures called They Marched into Sunlight based upon the Pulitzer nominated novel of the same name and an outline by Paul Greengrass, for Greengrass to direct, should it get a greenlight.

In June 2008, Daily Variety named Straczynski one of the top Ten Screenwriters to Watch. They announced Straczynski was writing Lensman for Ron Howard (to whom he had sold a screenplay entitled The Flickering Light), that he was selling another spec, Proving Ground, to Tom Cruise and United Artists. In October 2008, it was announced that Straczynski was engaged to pen a remake of the science fiction classic Forbidden Planet. In the fall of 2009, it was reported that Straczynski was writing a movie titled Shattered Union for Jerry Bruckheimer and Disney. The screenplay, based on the video game of that name, concerns itself with a present-day American civil war.

In October 2012, Valiant Entertainment announced a live-action feature film adaptation on its comic book series Shadowman, written and executive produced by Straczynski. The Flickering Light, Straczynski's directorial debut, was announced in February 2013, with the World War II drama set to be written and produced by Straczynski through his Studio JMS. Straczynski and Studio JMS optioned Harlan Ellison's short story "Repent, Harlequin!" Said the Ticktockman, who granted the option only after reading a finished screenplay written by Straczynski.

At San Diego Comic-Con in 2014, it was announced that Straczynski and Graphic India would team up with Chernin Entertainment to produce a feature film adaptation of his upcoming graphic novel Titans, to be written and produced by Straczynski, through Studio JMS.

Straczynski was hired to adapt Red Mars for Spike TV, based on the Kim Stanley Robinson novels, with Vince Gerardis as producer. In December 2015, Spike TV gave a 10-episode straight-to-series order to Red Mars, set to premiere in January 2017, with Straczynski serving as writer, executive producer, and showrunner through Studio JMS, and production set to begin in Summer 2016. On March 25, 2016 Deadline reported that Straczynski had left his position as showrunner with Peter Noah replacing him but he too left due to creative differences with Spike. Spike has put the series on hold for further development.

On July 30, 2021, Straczynski expressed an interest in becoming showrunner of the BBC Television series Doctor Who, following the departure of Chris Chibnall, confirming his representatives had been contacting the BBC. On August 19, Straczynski confirmed contact had been made with the BBC, but that the organization had already begun their own selection process and were not seeking new candidates. On September 24, 2021, the BBC confirmed former showrunner Russell T Davies would return, which Straczynski commended.

== Selected accolades ==
Year	Award	Category	Title of work	Result	Ref.
1988	Bram Stoker Award	Best First Novel	Demon Night	Nominated	
1994	Inkpot Award	—N/a	—N/a	Won	
1996	Hugo Award	Best Dramatic Presentation	Babylon 5 episode: "The Coming of Shadows"	Won	
1997	Hugo Award	Best Dramatic Presentation	Babylon 5 episode: "Severed Dreams"	Won	
1998	Saturn Award	Saturn Award for Best Writing	Babylon 5	Won	
1999	Bradbury Award	Outstanding Dramatic Presentation	Babylon 5	Won	
2002	Eisner Award	Best Serialized Story	The Amazing Spider-Man: "Coming Home"	Won	
2005	Eagle Award	Favourite Comics Writer	—N/a	Won	
2008	Christopher Award	Feature Films	Changeling	Won	
2009	BAFTA Award	Best Original Screenplay	Changeling	Nominated	
2009	Saturn Award	Best Writing	Changeling	Nominated	
2013	International Icon Award	—N/a	—N/a	Won	
2016	GLAAD Media Award	Outstanding Drama Series	Sense8	Won	
2016	Saturn Award	Best New Media Television Series	Sense8	Nominated	
2021	Best Indie Book Award	Best Book on Writing	Becoming A Writer, Staying A Writer	Won	

An asteroid, discovered in 1992 at the Kitt Peak National Observatory, was honorarily named 8379 Straczynski.

== Bibliography ==
=== Joe's Comics ===
- Rising Stars #1–24 (1999–2005)
- Midnight Nation #1–12 (2000–2002)

=== Marvel Comics ===
- The Amazing Spider-Man vol. 2 #30–58, vol. 1 #500–545 (2001–2007)
- Supreme Power #1–18 (Marvel MAX, 2003–2006)
- Silver Surfer: Requiem #1–4 (Marvel Knights, 2007)
- Thor vol. 3 #1–12, vol. 1 #600–603, Giant-Size Finale #1 (2007–2009)
- Thor vol. 6 #24 (2022)
- Captain America vol. 11
- The Amazing Spider-Man: Torn #1–5 (2025–2026)

=== DC Comics ===
- Superman: Earth One Volume 1–3 (2010–2015)
- Before Watchmen:
  - Nite Owl #1–4 (2012)
  - Dr. Manhattan #1–4 (2012)

== Filmography ==
=== Film writer ===
Year	Title	Director	Notes
2008	Changeling	Clint Eastwood	
2009	Ninja Assassin	James McTeigue	
2011	Thor	Kenneth Branagh	Story only
2012	Underworld: Awakening	Måns Mårlind; Björn Stein	
2013	World War Z	Marc Forster	Story only
2024	Watchmen	Brandon Vietti	
2027	One Second After	Scott Rogers	

=== Television ===
Year	Title	Credited as				Notes
Year	Title	Writer	Creator	Director	Producer	Notes
1984–1985	He-Man and the Masters of the Universe	Yes	No	No	No	Staff writer (9 episodes)
1985	She-Ra: Princess of Power	Yes	Yes	No	No	Writer (9 episodes), story editor
1985	Jayce and the Wheeled Warriors	Yes	No	No	No	Staff writer (13 episodes)
1986–1989	The Twilight Zone	Yes	No	No	No	Writer (12 episodes), story editor
1986–1990	The Real Ghostbusters	Yes	No	No	No	Writer (21 episodes), story editor
1987	CBS Storybreak	Yes	No	No	No	Episode "The Shy Stegosaurus of Cricket Creek"
1987	Spiral Zone	Yes	No	No	No	Episode "Mission Into Evil"
1987–1988	Captain Power and the Soldiers of the Future	Yes	No	No	No	Writer (14 episodes), executive story consultant
1989	Nightmare Classics	Yes	No	No	No	Episode "The Strange Case of Dr. Jekyll and Mr. Hyde"
1990	Jake and the Fatman	Yes	No	No	No	Writer (5 episodes), executive story consultant
1991–1993	Murder, She Wrote	Yes	No	No	Co-producer	Writer (7 episodes)
1993	Walker, Texas Ranger	Yes	No	No	Supervising	Episode "A Shadow in the Night"
1993–1998	Babylon 5	Yes	Yes	Yes	Executive	Writer (92 episodes), director (1 episode), cameo (final episode)
1999	Crusade	Yes	Yes	No	Executive	Writer (10 episodes)
2002–2004	Jeremiah	Yes	Yes	No	Executive	Writer (22 episodes)
2015–2018	Sense8	Yes	Yes	No	Executive	Writer (23 episodes)

TV movies

Year	Title	Writer	Producer
1993	Babylon 5: The Gathering	Yes	Yes
1998	Babylon 5: In the Beginning	Yes	Yes
1998	Babylon 5: Thirdspace	Yes	Yes
1998	Babylon 5: The River of Souls	Yes	Yes
1999	Babylon 5: A Call to Arms	Yes	Yes
2002	Babylon 5: The Legend of the Rangers	Yes	Yes
2023	Babylon 5: The Road Home	Yes	Yes

Preceded by Howard Mackie	The Amazing Spider-Man writer 2001–2007	Succeeded by Dan Slott
Preceded by Mark Waid	Fantastic Four writer 2005–2007	Succeeded by Dwayne McDuffie
Preceded by Michael Avon Oeming	Thor writer 2007–2009	Succeeded by Kieron Gillen
Preceded by Mark Waid	The Brave and the Bold writer 2009–2010	Succeeded by n/a
Preceded by James Robinson	Superman writer 2010–2011	Succeeded by Chris Roberson
Preceded by Gail Simone	Wonder Woman writer 2010–2011	Succeeded by Phil Hester
