= Dream Police (comics) =

2005 American comic book one-shot

- Cover of the 1st issue

Publication information
- Publisher: Marvel Comics
- Format: One-shot
- Publication date: June 22, 2005
- No. of issues: 1
- Main character(s): Joe Thursday; Frank Stafford

Creative team
- Created by: J. Michael Straczynski; Mike Deodato

Dream Police is an American comic book one-shot created by writer J. Michael Straczynski with artwork by Mike Deodato. It was published by Marvel Comics in June 2005, under their Icon imprint for creator-owned titles. Straczynski characterised the story as "Dragnet in the Dreamscape".

== Plot summary ==
In the near future, detectives Joe Thursday and Frank Stafford patrol the dreamscape, a surreal landscape in Los Angeles of dreams and nightmares. This reality is inhabited by entities such as echoes, wisps, ethers, and nightwalkers, who have died in their sleep, doomed to wander the dreamscape forever. These two partners think they have seen it all, until Frank disappears and the woman that appears in his place claims to have always been Joe's partner. Joe then ventures into the unknown to challenge the dreaming and shake its existence to the core.

== Sequel ==
A new series was published by Image Comics from 2014 to 2016 and included another major character, dream detective policewoman Kate Black.
