= By Any Means Necessary (Babylon 5) =

- Babylon 5 episode
- Episode no.: Season 1 Episode 12
- Directed by: Jim Johnston
- Written by: Kathryn M. Drennan
- Production code: 114
- Original air date: May 11, 1994

Guest appearances
- Katy Boyer as Neeoma Connally; John Snyder as Orin Zento; Aki Aleong as Senator Hidoshi

Episode chronology
| ← Previous "Survivors" | Next → "Signs and Portents" |

"By Any Means Necessary" is the 12th episode of the first season of the science fiction television series Babylon 5. The storyline involves a major industrial dispute involving the workers aboard the Babylon 5 station, its political ramifications back on Earth, and how Commander Jeffery Sinclair resolves the crisis. It first aired on May 11, 1994.

== Title ==
The episode was originally planned to have the title "Backlash", which was changed pre-production. The title refers to the (fictional) Rush Act, which – when enacted – permits a military commander to resolve an industrial strike by any means necessary, including the use of military force.

== Plot ==
A computer glitch causes a Narn vessel, docking to deliver cargo, to crash into another ship mistakenly cleared to leave Babylon 5. A dock worker, the brother of Delvientos, is killed in the subsequent explosion and fire. The dock workers' union, led by Neeoma Connally, insists this is a result of equipment failure and overworked crews. The former is confirmed by security; defective microchips from a subcontractor triggered the mistaken clearance of the departing vessel. Connally demands funding for new equipment and more staff, which Commander Sinclair agrees to request.

Earth Central's budget for Babylon 5 provides funding for neither demand, instead putting it toward weaponry. In response, the dock workers engage in a version of the "blue flu" (a reference by Garibaldi to police union members pretending to be sick to get around anti-strike regulations). Earth Senator Hidoshi orders Sinclair to end the de facto strike, but his attempt at appeasement backfires. Led by an angry Delvientos, the workers openly declare a strike.

The destroyed Narn vessel's cargo included a G'Quan Eth, a hard-to-obtain flower which Narn ambassador G'Kar needs for a religious ritual in a few days. It transpires that Centauri Ambassador Londo Mollari has the only one left on the station, which he agrees to sell for 50,000 credits, exponentially more than market value. When G'Kar grudgingly accepts, Mollari reneges in retribution for the Narn attack on Ragesh III, during which his nephew was tortured. Seething, G'Kar arranges for an important Centauri idol to be stolen as a bargaining chip, while Sinclair is forced to endure this petty conflict as a neutral agent.

Orin Zento, the (ostensible) negotiator sent by the Earth Senate Labor Committee, offers nothing but empty promises and threats of retribution. The strike gives Earth Senate the excuse it needs to invoke the Rush Act, which permits a commander to use any means necessary, including the use of force, to end a strike. The workers end up rioting when a security force moves to arrest them, with Commander Sinclair managing to end the situation before anyone gets seriously injured. Zento then has the Senate invoke the Act.

Arranging for one final negotiation, Sinclair finds a loophole in the orders that allows him to divert excess funding from the military budget to hire additional workers and upgrade the dock equipment, as well as to grant amnesty to the strikers. When the stunned Zento protests, Sinclair notes that the phrase "any means necessary" in the Rush Act clearly allows him to fully acquiesce to the strikers' demands to resolve the situation. Delighted at this unexpectedly swift victory, the workers agree to immediately resume their duties. Later, Senator Hidoshi praises Sinclair for his cleverness and advocacy for the workers, but warns that the humiliated Zento has powerful friends who will be keen to make trouble for Sinclair.

Meanwhile, Mollari demands retribution against G'Kar for the stolen Centauri artifact. Sinclair informs Mollari that the G'Quan Eth is a controlled substance only allowed for medical or religious purposes, and must be impounded. Mollari agrees, but a despairing G'Kar believes he only did so because it is too late for the religious ceremony: it must be performed when the rays of sunlight touch the G'Quan Mountain at a specific time of year. Sinclair reminds him that the rules of the ritual predate Narns traveling between the stars, so there is now a loophole: the light from 10 Narn years ago is still traveling and is now about to reach Babylon 5, so G'Kar can perform the ritual with the required rays of sunlight. A delighted G'Kar thanks Sinclair and assures him the Centauri artifact will be returned. As such, G'Kar makes his preparations and performs his religious observance with some careful timing for the anticipated light's arrival.

== Writing ==
This episode was written by Kathryn M. Drennan, wife at the time of Babylon 5 creator and executive producer J. Michael Straczynski. She had previously written television scripts, mainly for animated programs, and had worked as a journalist for magazines such as Twilight Zone Magazine and Women's World. In order to avoid the appearance of favoritism, Straczynski had her submit (rather than be assigned) a full script, and required it to be approved by others in the production crew other than him. Unlike other writers, for whom Straczynski revised scripts himself, revisions of Drennan's script mostly went through story editor Larry DiTillio instead. Straczynski wrote, "It's a very intense script in which we basically put Sinclair through the wringer for 48 hours and try and make him absolutely nuts. And succeed, for the most part." Drennan later wrote the Babylon 5 novel, To Dream in the City of Sorrows, which follows Jeffery Sinclair's story after he leaves the station after season 1.

The Matewan Massacre referred to by Neeoma Connally was a 1920 industrial confrontation between coal mine workers and the mine company, which brought in a private detective agency to settle the dispute. Events resulted in a shootout in which several people died. The fictional Rush Act was named by Drennan after the conservative talk show host Rush Limbaugh.

== Production ==
=== Cast and filming ===
According to Straczynski, a number of people involved in the production, including lead actor Michael O'Hare, regard the episode as their favorite so far.

The role of union representative Neeoma Connally was played by American actress Katy Boyer, while John Snyder played the character of Orin Zento. Snyder played the second Soul Hunter in the earlier episode, "Soul Hunter". Straczynski regarded both of their performances as being very good.

The part of dock foreman Eduardo Delvientos was played by Jose Rey, with Earth Senator Hidoshi – who appears several times in Season 1 – being played by actor and singer-songwriter Aki Aleong. Aleong last played the same character in 'Deathwalker'. Babylon 5 intentionally cast a large number of non-white actors in various roles. Straczynski wrote, "It's been my belief, and I'll say it again, that if we go to the stars at all, we're all going... or no one's going."

The episode was directed by Jim Johnston, who previously directed the episodes, Soul Hunter, The Parliament of Dreams and Survivors. Johnston also appears as the dock worker who yells, "I say we strike!. The original script didn't actually include scenes of the workers striking. Johnston noticed this and requested the inclusion of a worker calling his colleagues to strike. Johnston was told the budget had already been finalised and it wasn't possible to include another day actor. So Johnston decided to step in on the last day of filming and play the role himself. About twenty members of the production staff were also dragged in front of the camera by Johnston, and appear in the episode as members of the crowd.

Commander Sinclair's unshaven, run-down appearance in this episode actually began because actor Michael O'Hare had only just arrived in California from New York where he'd had to be for the weekend. Director Jim Johnston thought that O'Hare's performance was particularly good when he was tired, so he instructed O'Hare to stay up late, and didn't allow him to shave for the rest of the week.

=== Visual effects ===
Babylon 5 pioneered the use of computer-generated imagery (CGI) scenes in a television series, with the visual effects for season 1 were created by Foundation Imaging using Commodore Amiga computers with LightWave 3D software. Visual effects team leader Ron Thornton, who worked on both Babylon 5 and Star Trek episodes during his career, wrote that the Babylon 5 visual effects budgets were around one tenth of the corresponding Star Trek budgets, but that Babylon 5 effects were "...much more fun to do."

The design for Earth transport shuttle – seen rising on an elevator in front of the Narn transport ship before the docking bay accident – was digitally created by Thornton as a variation of a physical miniature for a shuttle which he had built before he had worked for the BBC. The original miniature had been used as a shuttle in the Blake's 7 episode, Orbit.

The freighter ships seen outside the station waiting to dock during the dock workers' strike were created digitally by Foundation Imaging artists taking parts from previously created ships, described by digital animator Mark Kochinski as "kitbashing". The central hull tubes were modelled by Thornton, and the cargo pods were created by Kochinski, who writes that some of the ships seem to have a re-colored bridge taken from the Earth president's ship, Earthforce One, which appeared in the previous episode, "Survivors".

=== Music ===
Music for the title sequence and the episode was provided by the series' composer, Christopher Franke. Franke developed themes for each of the main characters, the station, for space in general, and for the alien races, endeavoring to carry a sense of the character of each race.

== Story arc significance ==
Reviewer Elias Rosner notes that In this episode, elements introduced in the first half of the season begin to become relevant to the unfolding of the characters, and to coming plot lines. Centauri ambassador Mollari's toying with Ambassador G'Kar is a response to the Narn capture of the Centauri outpost on Ragesh 3 in the first episode of the season, "Midnight on the Firing Line".

Author Jane Killick highlights the development of G'Kar's character – the process having begun in "Mind War" –: for the first time in the series he is portrayed as having a deeply religious character, with his role as the senior Narn official on the station bringing with it the role of being the religious leader for the Narn on Babylon 5. In a similar vein, Straczynski notes that while previously, G'Kar, in his struggle with Centauri Ambassador Londo Mollari, was the one portraying negatively, continually baiting Londo, G'Kar is painted in positive light in this relationship for the first time.

Rowan Kaiser, writing in The A.V. Club points out that the episode highlights that things on back home on Earth are going seriously wrong in the political arena: the villain isn't a shadowy figure, but rather the budget committee in the Earth Senate. The Earth Senate's dissatisfaction with Sinclair's leadership style and handling of situations had been building up for weeks: Elias Rosner writes, "Things are changing back on Earth, not always for the better. What comes next is going to be an interesting time for sure.

Rowan Kaiser writes that the story is in one sense a continuation of "The Parliament of Dreams" – where religious ceremonies of the major races were depicted – with this episode finally showing the Narn religious ceremony that was left out. The episode also refers to the ancient Narn religious text, the Book of G'Quan for the first time in series. The book will have a significant role in the overarching storyline.

== Commentaries and reviews ==
Sherryl Vint, in her essay, "Babylon 5: Our First, Best Hope for Mature Science Fiction Television' highlights Babylon 5's complex vision of the future – contrasted with the static depictions of future civilisation which typify many science fiction programs – a future, with flawed human characters "...who struggle with alcoholism, drug addiction, failed love affairs, greed, weakness, fear, selfishness, and the like". She writes that the episode underscores that the conflicts are "...not only life-or-death encounters with ancient forces, but also familiar struggles with Senate subcommittees and resource allocation."

Writers Ensley Guffey and Dale Koontz describe this episode as "the closest thing to a monster-of-the-week episode thus far," but note the twist: that the 'monster' is the bureaucracy and budget process behind the running of the station. They describe the episode for being "brilliant for again refusing to paint a picture of the future in which all socio-political problems have been solved."

Reviewer Rowan Kaiser writes that this episode was, "a pleasant surprise", as he was not expecting an episode which is inessential to the overall series plot to be of such high quality. He regards it as his favorite episode so far in the series.

Kaiser also praises the characters in the episode. He notes that it brought out the best in both Michael O'Hare and Jerry Doyle's characters, Commander Sinclair and Security Chief Michael Garibaldi, respectively, and highlighting a moment where, upon hearing Senator Hidoshi's report during a communication with Earth, Sinclair and Garibaldi share a small knowing glance at each other, knowing full well the ramifications they will have to suffer. Kaiser also notes the character of union representative Neeoma Connally, who has the difficult role of representing blue-collar workers on the station to the white-collar station leadership. Kaiser writes about feeling "sad upon remembering that she wasn't an important recurring character."

Kaiser highlights the tension between Sinclair and Garibaldi's sympathy for the dock workers' cause, with their role as representatives of EarthGov, where they will be forced against their will to be good soldiers. He writes, "Everything leading toward the climax indicates that this is going to be a mess." Kaiser points out that the Senate allowed Sinclair's resolution, not because they agreed with him, but because it was popular in the polls: meaning that the Senate in no longer representative of the people, but serving the interests of those in power. Kaiser sums up the episode, saying it is, "...tight, smart, and morally ambiguous in a way that makes Babylon 5 fell distinct. Don't skip this one."

Elias Rosner, writing in the entertainment magazine website Multiversity Comics in 2018, comments on the contemporary nature of the issues in the episode, observing that it "could have been written yesterday." He writes that the problems are issues we experienced then, and still experience now.

Rosner also finds it interesting to watch to see what each party in the conflict wants, and what they can do, pointing out that Connally and Sinclair both want the same thing, but notes that "...Sinclair's hands are tied which means so are Connally's." Whereas the Senate, with a primary concern for Babylon 5's military purposes, doesn't care about the welfare of the workers, sending Zento, who has no interest in negotiating in good faith.

Rosner found the secondary plot line – concerning G'Kar's efforts to obtain the G'Quan Eth plant for his religious ceremony – compelling. Rosner was intrigued to know what would come next, wondering what G'Kar would resort to, asking how desperate was he, and what humanity he would show in his struggle with Londo, whilst noting that Londo is both in the right, but also being annoyingly and unreasonably difficult. Rosner writes, "It's nothing extraordinary but it does just what it should do: entertain, expand on the [characters], and intersect the main plot just enough to tie the two together."

Rosner sums up by saying that both sub-plots are about finding peace in conflict, and both resolutions are achieved by exploiting loopholes: the first being against a harsh law, but the second being in a spirit of celebration.
