= Drennan =

Drennan is a surname of Irish origin. Variations of the name are found primarily in Ireland, Scotland, and the United States. The surname is purportedly derived from the Gaelic Ó Droighneáin, Ó Draighnáin, or Ua Draighnen, meaning 'descendant of Draighnen', or 'descendant of blackthorn'. Variant spellings include Drennen, Drenning, Drennon, Drinan, Drinnan, Drinnon, and Drynan. Thornton is another Anglicized surname from the same original Gaelic form.

== Background ==
The Irish Uí Draighnáins, a descendant clan of the dynasty of Uí Maine, specifically claiming descent from the Síol Anmchadha branch, were chiefs of the country lying around Sliabh Eisi, on the borders of County Clare and Galway. They were formerly hereditary chief Brehons or judges of the principalities of Hy-Many and Hy-Fiachra Aidhne, in South Connacht, and had their chief residence at a place called Ard-na-Cno, in the parish of Killiny, and barony of Kiltartan, as we are informed in the Book of Lecan: "To the Aes Brengair belongs the stewardship of the arch-chief of Hy-Many, and it is the office of the Ui-Draighnen to distribute justice to the tribes."

== Statistics ==
According to statistics cited by Patrick Hanks, 1,113 people on the island of Great Britain and 592 on the island of Ireland bore the surname Drennan in 2011. In 1881 there were 404 people with the surname in Great Britain, primarily at Renfrewshire, Ayrshire, Lanarkshire, and Lancashire. In mid-19th-century Ireland, people with the surname Drennan were found mainly at County Laois and County Kilkenny. The 2010 United States census found 4,233 people with the surname Drennan, making it the 7,821st-most-common name in the country. This represented an increase in absolute numbers, but a decrease in relative frequency, from 3,927 (7,811th-most-common) in the 2000 Census.

== People with the surname ==
- Alexander Drennan (1899–1971), New Zealand labourer, trade unionist, communist and watersider
- Alexander Murray Drennan (1884–1984), Scottish pathologist
- America McCutchen Drennan (1830–1903), American educator and missionary
- Anthony Drennan (born 1958), Irish guitarist
- Bruce Drennan (born 1950), American sports announcer
- Bryce W. Drennan (born 1963), American writer
- Cathy Drennan (fl. 1995–present), American professor of chemistry and biology
- Charles Drennan (born 1960), New Zealand Roman Catholic bishop
- David Drennan (1944–2018), Northern Ireland, Lt. Col. Royal Irish Regiment
- David I Drennan (born 1979), Northern Ireland Civil Servant
- David W. Drennan (born 2003), Northern Ireland
- Ellie Drennan (born 1998), Australian singer-songwriter
- John Drennan, Irish journalist and writer
- John Drennan (cricketer) (born 1932), Australian cricketer
- John Cherry Drennan (1899–1983), Northern Ireland politician
- John Swanwick Drennan (1809–1893), Irish poet
- Kathryn M. Drennan (fl. 1977–present), American writer
- Keity Drennan (born 1990), Panamanian model
- Lillie Elizabeth Drennan (1897–1974), American truck driver
- Mandy Drennan (born 1988), Australian Paralympic swimmer
- Mark Drennan (born 1972), American politician from West Virginia
- Martin Drennan (1944–2022), Irish Roman Catholic bishop
- Michael Drennan (born 1994) Irish professional footballer
- Natasha Newsome Drennan, Irish politician
- Peter Thomas Drennan (born 1957), Australian and United Nations security official
- Robert Drennan (fl. 1975–present), American archaeologist
- Samuel Drennan (1819–1882), Irish-born merchant and politician in Ontario, Canada
- Thomas Drennan (1696–1768), Irish Presbyterian minister
- Thomas J. Drennan (1877–1928), New York City Fire Commissioner
- Tommy Drennan (1941–2024), Irish singer
- William Drennan (1754–1820), Irish poet
- William Melville Drennan (1853–1900), merchant and politician in Ontario, Canada
