= Survivors (Babylon 5) =

- Babylon 5 episode
- Episode no.: Season 1 Episode 11
- Directed by: Jim Johnston
- Written by: Mark Scott Zicree
- Production code: 111
- Original air date: May 4, 1994

Guest appearances
- Elaine Thomas as Lianna Kemmer; Tom Donaldson as Cutter

Episode chronology
← Previous "Believers"	Next → "By Any Means Necessary"

"Survivors" is the eleventh episode of the first season of the science fiction television series, Babylon 5. It first aired on May 4, 1994.

== Plot ==
Earth President Luis Santiago is scheduled to visit the Babylon 5 space station. Ahead of his visit, the station is set to receive a new wing of fighters to be permanently based there, which will be used for escort upon the President's arrival. While going to inspect the fighter launch bays, security chief Garibaldi and Lieutenant Commander Ivanova narrowly avoid an explosion in a nearby bay. A worker in a space suit is blown into space. In Medlab, Dr. Franklin tends an injured man, Nolan, telling Sinclair and Garibaldi that any attempt to rouse the patient would kill him. Initial investigation suggests the explosion was set purposely, and due to the impending visit, Earthforce sends Major Lianna Kemmer to lead the investigation.

Garibaldi and Kemmer have a history, as seventeen years prior, Garibaldi's behavior had led to the death of Kemmer's father, Frank – who was an old friend of Garibaldi's – by enemies Garibaldi created, though Garibaldi was not directly responsible. Kemmer, who is resentful of Garibaldi's presence, wakes Nolan to question him against Dr. Franklin's advice. In response to being asked who caused the bombing, Nolan wakes up just long enough to mutter Garibaldi's name before he dies. Sinclair, though sure that Garibaldi is not guilty, is forced to have Garibaldi turn over his security pass and weapon while the investigation takes place.

Cutter, Kemmer's second in command, searches Garibaldi's quarters and finds plans to the fighter bay and Centauri ducats, suggesting Garibaldi was paid to execute the bombing. Garibaldi flees before he can be caught. Sinclair and Ivanova remain convinced that Garibaldi has been set up, and do their best to slow down Kemmer's investigation, such as blocking all communications to Earth under the guise of maintenance. Garibaldi discretely speaks with Ambassadors Mollari and G'Kar to try to track the source of the ducats, learning they were likely purchased on the station with standard credits. Garibaldi tries to question seedy aliens who he knows have performed such deals, but ends up in a fight; Sinclair, having heard of a security incident, arrives to help rescue Garibaldi, but insists Garibaldi should turn himself in and let them clear up the matter. Garibaldi refuses and runs off. He takes shelter in a questionable bar, and ends up getting heavily drunk. Upon leaving the bar, he is easily captured by Kemmer.

With the new fighters having arrived and the President's ship making the jump, preparations are made to launch the fighters. As Kemmer interrogates Garibaldi, they learn that Sinclair ordered a search of Nolan's quarters and found more ducats, as well as information pertaining to the Home Guard, a group of humans on Earth that want to purify Earth from aliens. Garibaldi comes up with a hypothesis: that the Home Guard was planning to attack during the visit of President Santiago to derail the President's alien-friendly course and that Nolan was trying to plant the bomb when it was set off prematurely by the plasma drivers in the launch bay. He also suggests that Cutter likewise belongs to the Home Guard and planted the evidence against him. Though Kemmer is skeptical, she agrees to go with Garibaldi to the bays to inspect them once more, having already sent Cutter to do so. When they arrive there, Cutter knocks out Kemmer before Garibaldi attacks him. Garibaldi defeats Cutter and contacts Ivanova to hold the fighter launch, now convinced that there are bombs set to explode upon launch.

The bombs are successfully defused, and Garibaldi is reinstated. The President's trip is successful. As Kemmer leaves for her shuttle, she thanks Garibaldi for the "creative" report he had written on the situation. Garibaldi says he owes her for Frank. She apologizes, saying she had no excuse for what she put him through: as Sinclair had suspected, she was not out for justice, but for blood. Garibaldi replies that they had both died inside upon her father's death and that she had lashed out because it had hurt her so much. He adds that all they can do is survive and maybe, one day, forget how much it hurts to be human. Before walking away, Kemmer turns back to give him an embrace.

== Title ==
According to series creator J. Michael Straczynski, the episode title was originally "A Knife in the Shadows". The title "Survivors" comes from a dialogue at the end of the episode between Garibaldi and Major Lianna Kemmer as she leaves Babylon 5. Garibaldi refers to the death of Lianna's father Frank, saying, "Seventeen years ago we both died inside. But somehow we survived. For better or worse, that's all we can do. Survive and, maybe one day, forget how much it can hurt to be human." Straczynski regards "Survivors" as being a more apt title.

== Production, visual and sound effects ==
The role of Lianna Kemmer was played by actor and producer Eliane Thomas, with Robin Wake portraying Lianna as a child. Kemmer's assistant, Cutter, was played by Tom Donaldson. General Netter, played by Rod Perry, was named after executive producer Douglas Netter. While President Luis Santiago is not seen in this episode, his voice is heard giving a speech. He was previously portrayed by a photograph of Douglas Netter. The recurring character of security officer Lou Welch was played by David Crowley, and the ISN news anchor, who appears in multiple episodes across the series and its spin-off, Crusade, was played by Maggie Egan.

The Babylon 5 makeup department involved in this episode – consisting of Everett Burrell, Greg Funk, Mary Kay Morse, Ron Pipes and John Vulich – won the 1994 Emmy Award for Outstanding Individual Achievement in Makeup for a Series for episode 5 of the season, "The Parliament of Dreams".

For its visual effects scenes, Babylon 5 pioneered the use of computer-generated imagery (CGI) scenes – instead of using more expensive physical models – in a television series. This also enabled motion effects which are difficult to create using models, such as the rotation of fighter craft along multiple axes, or the rotation and banking of a virtual camera. The visual effects were created by Foundation Imaging using 24 Commodore Amiga 2000 computers with LightWave 3D software and Video Toaster cards, 16 of which were dedicated to rending each individual frame of CGI, with each frame taking on average 45 minutes to render. In-house resource management software managed the workload of the Amiga computers to ensure that no machine was left idle during the image rendering process.

The production team began the use of computer generated virtual sets for certain scenes. This episode has an early example: at the end of the episode when Kemmer boards a shuttle, the walls, the ship and the door she enters were all CGI, with the boarding stairs being the only physical prop.

The presidential ship, Earthforce One, was designed by Ron Thornton, its color scheme being that of the US presidential aircraft Air Force One. As Air Force One is a modified luxury passenger aircraft, Thornton thought to adapt the design of the Asimov passenger liner shown in the series. Earthforce One was also inspired by a ship with a saucer-shaped section, travelling flat end first, in a comic series called The Rise and Fall of the Trigan Empire, which Thornton had admired when he was young. The four elongated hexagonal panels extending from the ship are not solar panels, but rather depict heat exchangers, as are the similar panels on the rear of the Babylon 5 station. As Thornton used the shape frequently, visual effects artist John Teska dubbed the shape a "Thorntagon", although Thornton mentioned that Steve Burg also used it a lot, so it should be called a "Burg/Thorntagon".

The Starfury fighters, were designed by Steve Burg as a function-driven design for a plausible zero-gravity fighter. The positioning of the four engine pods at the extremities of the craft was inspired by Ron Cobb’s design for the Gunstar fighter from The Last Starfighter. The Starfury's "wings" are not aerodynamic: their function is to lever the engines away from the center of mass. Their basic shape was taken from an earlier unused design by Burg for a military fighting robot, which he had designed for Terminator 2.

The shuttle craft were also designed by Ron Thornton, based on a ship which he had originally built as a physical model for the BBC, which was used as the shuttle in the Blake's 7 episode "Orbit".

Music for the title sequence and the episode was provided by the series' composer, Christopher Franke. Franke developed themes for each of the main characters, the station, for space in general, and for the alien races, endeavoring to carry a sense of the character of each race.

== Writing and storyline significance ==
The episode was written by science fiction novelist and screenwriter Marc Scott Zicree, who has written for many science fiction series, including the Star Trek franchise, Space Command (2020) and He-Man and the Masters of the Universe. As Babylon 5 was conceived with an overall five-year story arc, the episode was written as both an individual story and with another level, where the hints of the larger story arc were given. The series' creator, J. Michael Straczynski, indicates that the episodes can be watched for the individual stories, the character stories, or the story arc.

The series story arc develops in various ways in this episode. Garibaldi's troubled past, first hinted at in "Infection", where he refuses to answer a news reporter's questions, comes back to haunt him. Being the only honest cop amidst widespread corruption on Europa led to the death of his only friend there, Frank Kemmer, as Garibaldi became blacklisted and fell into alcoholism.

The Earth anti-alien group, the Home Guard, first appearing in "The War Prayer", returns, where Malcolm's promise – that they have friends everywhere – is outworked here. Both Nolan, the maintenance worker, and Cutter, second in command of presidential security, are members. Elias Rosner writes, "If that doesn't send a terrifying message, I don't know what else to tell you." This seeds another plot thread: the antagonism between Home Guard and not just the Babylon 5 officers, but also President Santiago. Rosner comments on the insidiousness of their organization, and how it shows how patient this kind of hate is, and what happens right under our noses.

== Reviews ==
Rowan Kaiser, writing in The A.V. Club, sees the primary purpose of the episode as explaining Garibaldi's backstory. Garibaldi's past is characterized by both integrity and alcoholism, although in the opinions of many people from his past, the alcoholism overwhelms the integrity. Kaiser sees this as theoretically a good way to add depth, as Garibaldi's character is too easily defined by his job, but in practice, Kaiser sees the episode as a "generic bad action movie". He writes, "There's a core of something that works here, but 'Survivors' doesn't pull it off."

Elias Rosner, writing in the entertainment magazine website Multiversity Comics, notes that this episode begins to bring together small elements from earlier in the season to make them important for the larger storylines and character arcs. On Garibaldi, Rosner comments that Garibaldi only gives up drinking again because of the shame of succumbing when things were tough, and the shame of being exactly what Kemmer believed him to be, and he admits it – he has to live with those decisions, but whether he is fully changed is left ambiguous.

In addition to providing insight into Garibaldi's character and his past, and the looming situation with the Home Guard, Rosner notes the interactions of the ambassadors, Londo and G'Kar, with a fleeing Garibaldi – who no longer has his usual position and power – providing insight into the way their minds work.
