= Believers (Babylon 5) =

- Babylon 5 episode
- Episode no.: Season 1 Episode 10
- Directed by: Richard Compton
- Written by: David Gerrold
- Production code: 105
- Original air date: April 27, 1994

Guest appearances
- Tricia O'Neil as M'ola; Stephen Lee as Tharg; Jonathan Charles Kaplan as Shon; Silvana Gallardo as Maya Henandez

Episode chronology
← Previous "Deathwalker"	Next → "Survivors"

"Believers" is the tenth episode of the first season of the science fiction television series, Babylon 5. It first aired on April 27, 1994. It follows Dr. Franklin's ethical dilemma after he encounters a dying boy whose parents refuse to allow him to receive treatment that will save him, and Commander Susan Ivanova's mission to rescue a stranded transport ship in Raider territory.

== Plot ==
Dr. Franklin faces an ethical dilemma when the parents of Shon, a dying alien child, refuse to let him operate for religious reasons. Their son is suffering from a fatal respiratory ailment. Franklin is confident he can save Shon, with surgery, but the family's religion prohibits surgery, due to a belief that cutting into a body will release the spirit, reducing the body to an empty shell. They mention it as something only done to food animals in their culture. Franklin's associate Dr. Hernandez attacks their beliefs, but Franklin reprimands her, telling her that they have to work with the parents, not against them.

When he does not get their consent for the operation, however, he decides to appeal to Commander Sinclair, asking for permission to operate. He points to the precedent of the earlier life-saving operation on Kosh, the Vorlon ambassador, by the station's previous doctor in violation of the Vorlons' requests. Sinclair says he will decide within 24 hours. During this time, Shon's parents attempt to sway the other alien ambassadors to intervene on their behalf, but none of them is willing to do so. Even Sinclair finds that Earth does not want a part in this decision. He goes to talk to Shon to make his determination. Though realizing the boy wants to live, he eventually turns down Franklin's request, in order to maintain the cultural neutrality of the station. With Shon near death, his parents spend more time with him before they depart; as soon as they leave, Franklin decides to operate anyway.

The operation is a success, and Franklin points out to Shon that his spirit has not changed, but when Shon's parents arrive, they treat him as an soulless demon and abandon him. They eventually return for him, saying that they have brought his "travel robe", but also that he will be able "to rest." After they leave, Franklin checks Hernandez's notes on the species in the medical database and realizes that they had brought a robe used for spiritual journeys, not physical ones. He runs to the family's quarters, but it is too late. The parents have already slain the boy, believing that only "a shell" was left anyway. Later, Sinclair informally reprimands Franklin, suggesting that he should not have asked in the first place. Trying to console Franklin, he observes that Shon's fate would not have changed regardless of what Franklin did.

In a subplot, a restless Lt. Commander Susan Ivanova gets Sinclair to allow her to lead a squadron of fighters into Raider territory in order to rescue a stranded transport ship, the Asimov. She eventually ends up going against orders and following an enemy scout. This results in her discovering a fleet of Raiders waiting in ambush. She stops the ambush, thus saving the families aboard the transport.

== Production, visual and sound effects ==
The role of Shon's mother, M'ola, was played by Tricia O'Neil who is particularly known for playing investigative, police and science fiction roles. She played the Earth Alliance President in the TV movie Babylon 5: In the Beginning. She played a number of roles in the Star Trek franchise, including Captain Rachel Garrett, captain of USS Enterprise NCC-1701-C in the Star Trek: The Next Generation episode, "Yesterday's Enterprise".

Actor and acting coach Silvana Gallardo played the character of Dr. Maya Hernandez. Gallardo created the Gallardo Method for acting, and played alongside Charles Bronson in Death Wish II, playing a rape victim.

Babylon 5 intentionally cast a large number of non-white actors in various roles. Series creator J Michael Straczynski wrote, "It's been my belief, and I'll say it again, that if we go to the stars at all, we're ALL going".

The Babylon 5 makeup department involved in this episode – consisting of Everett Burrell, Greg Funk, Mary Kay Morse, Ron Pipes and John Vulich – won the 1994 Emmy Award for Outstanding Individual Achievement in Makeup for a Series for episode 5 of the season, "The Parliament of Dreams".

For its visual effects scenes, Babylon 5 pioneered the use of computer-generated imagery (CGI) scenes – instead of using more expensive physical models – in a television series. This also enabled motion effects which are difficult to create using models, such as the rotation of fighter craft along multiple axes, or the rotation and banking of a virtual camera. The visual effects were created by Foundation Imaging using 24 Commodore Amiga 2000 computers with LightWave 3D software and Video Toaster cards, 16 of which were dedicated to rending each individual frame of CGI, with each frame taking on average 45 minutes to render. In-house resource management software managed the workload of the Amiga computers to ensure that no machine was left idle during the image rendering process.

The Starfury fighters were designed by Steve Burg as a function-driven design for a plausible zero-gravity fighter. The positioning of the four engine pods at the extremities of the craft was inspired by Ron Cobb's design for the Gunstar fighter from The Last Starfighter. The basic shape of the Starfury's wings was inspired by an earlier unused design by Burg for a military robot fighting machine, which he had originally designed for Terminator 2. This was merged with the multi-engined configuration to form the Starfury design. Burg points out that the wings/struts were not aerodynamic: they were there to lever the engines away from the center of mass.

The Raiders' fighters were designed by Ron Thornton. He writes, "I stuck with that design to easily differentiate between the front and the back. It was also really economical – not many polygons which was good as a lot of them would appear on screen – and it was pretty iconic. So when fighting with Starfuries it was really easy to tell who was who."

Music for the title sequence and the episode was provided by the series' composer, Christopher Franke. Franke developed themes for each of the main characters, the station, for space in general, and for the alien races, endeavoring to carry a sense of the character of each race.

== Writing and storyline significance ==
As Babylon 5 was conceived with an overall five-year story arc, the episode was written as both an individual story and with another level, where the hints of the larger story arc were given. The series' creator, J. Michael Straczynski indicates that the episodes can be watched for the individual stories, the character stories, or the story arc.

This episode develops the idea of different races' beliefs about the soul. Rowan Kaiser writes,

The concept of the "soul", introduced in "Soul Hunter" and continued here, is an important aspect of Babylon 5's metaphysics. Although there are some quotes from (atheist) J. Michael Straczynski indicating that he thinks the series is ambiguous about the reality of the soul, there's a great deal of textual support for Delenn and the Minbari beliefs in the soul, referred to here.

== Reviews ==
=== The A.V. Club ===
Rowan Kaiser, writing in The A.V. Club, points out that this episode did a good job of not favoring one belief worldview over another, letting the viewer make the decision. Kaiser writes that this episode showcases the character of Dr. Franklin, and the ethical beliefs which drive him: "We see that he is a man with strong ethical beliefs, and a willingness to get into trouble over them. But those beliefs are tied into a certain arrogance, demonstrated when he demands an apology in apparent victory over a pissed-off Sinclair. It's a real sucker punch of an ending for him."

Kaiser also comments on the unusual ending for a pre-2000 episode: "Hell, 'the kid dies' is a shocking ending ... It's an indication of the rising moral ambiguity of television, and another piece of evidence for calling Babylon 5 a crucial transitional television series."

=== Multiversity Comics ===
Elias Rosner, writing in the entertainment magazine website Multiversity Comics, observes that the episode is the character of Dr. Franklin's first failure on the show. Rosner points out that in this episode, the viewer shares his worldview. "Yet, by episode's end, we're asked not to share in Dr. Franklin's horror at the death of the child at the hands of his parents. Instead, we are asked to question our own belief system and the ways in which people put theirs over someone else's."

Rosner notes that the episode refrains from passing judgement on Franklin or the parents exclusively, but rather, points out the problems with both. "For Franklin, it's his arrogance in believing that he knows best, knows all, no matter what ... For the family, it is their utter unwillingness to bend to save their child's life and their pride."

He concludes,

It's easy to villainize those who have a system that contradiction your own. It's harder to see those beliefs and say they are valid. It's even harder to know when something is truly villainous and when it's merely based on a different set of definitions. And it's even harder to admit when one is wrong.

=== Den of Geek ===
Jules-Pierre Malartre, writing in the science fiction review site, Den of Geek, describes Richard Biggs' performance as Dr. Stephen Franklin as "brilliant" and "emotionally charged", in a powerful episode which deals with a timeless issue: scientific advancement vs religion. Malartre notes that it is not a matter of right versus wrong, but rather the pros and cons of "a religion that has survived faster-than-light travel clashing against the social values of a multicultural, advanced community ... and the personal beliefs of a medical doctor with the power of life over death."

He concludes, "As much as some people have been saying that the first season was a mess, early first season episodes [like] 'Believers', 'Deathwalker' and 'Mind War' were already setting the tone for a very mature, thought-provoking sci-fi show."

== See also ==
- Jehovah's Witnesses and blood transfusions, an inspiration for the episode's plot
