= Deathwalker =

- Babylon 5 episode
- Episode no.: Season 1 Episode 9
- Directed by: Bruce Seth Green
- Written by: Lawrence G. DiTillio
- Production code: 113
- Original air date: April 20, 1994

Guest appearances
- Sarah Douglas as Jha'dur; Robin Curtis as Ambassador Kalika; Cosie Costa as Abbut; Aki Aleong as Senator Hidoshi

Episode chronology
← Previous "And the Sky Full of Stars"	Next → "Believers"

"Deathwalker" is the ninth episode of the first season of the science fiction television series, Babylon 5. It first aired on 20 April 1994. ' The episode deals with the arrival on Babylon 5 of a Dilgar war criminal nicknamed "Deathwalker".

== Title ==
The title refers to "Deathwalker", the name by which many races refer to the notorious genocidal war criminal Jha'dur who arrives on the station in the episode.

== Plot ==
An alien woman arriving on Babylon 5 is attacked by Narn diplomatic attaché Na'Toth as she arrives. Na'Toth accuses her of being notorious war criminal "Deathwalker". The woman is knocked unconscious and taken to Medlab, while Commander Sinclair questions Na'Toth on her attack. Na'Toth asserts that Deathwalker was a war criminal responsible for a number of unethical and illegal experiments on the Narn people during wartime. In Medlab, Sinclair identifies the woman as a Dilgar, a species that had previously gone to war against many non-aligned worlds, but had died out thirty years ago when their sun went nova. Sinclair continues to investigate the Deathwalker name, finding it attached to a Dilgar known as Jha'dur, an expert in biochemical, biogenetic, and cyber-organic weapons who led the Dilgar invasion. Sinclair learns rumors that Jha'dur was at one point sheltered by a sect of the Minbari warrior caste, the Wind Swords. Minbari diplomatic aide Lennier cannot confirm this.

Earth's government learns of the Dilgar woman's arrival, and orders Commander Sinclair to transport her to Earth immediately. This order troubles Sinclair. In Medlab, the woman wakes up and affirms she is Jha'dur, otherwise known as Deathwalker, but indicates that she has come for a different purpose: she has started development of a drug which will give its user immortality. Dr Franklin affirms a sample of Jha'dur's work shows promise but will need years of research to complete. Sinclair has Jha'dur placed under security as travel to Earth is arranged. During this, Jha'Dur approaches G'Kar, offering them her immortality drug in exchange for executing Na'Toth. G'Kar flatly refuses, and goes to warn the other ambassadors from the non-aligned worlds.

As Sinclair escorts Jha'Dur to her ship, the non-aligned world representatives stop them and demand that Jha'dur be brought to trial. Sinclair agrees to hold a council meeting. Sinclair believes that with Minbar voting to bring Jha'Dur to trial with the non-aligned worlds, they will be able to stop Earth from taking her. However, he is surprised when Lennier votes to not hold Jha'dur accountable, angering the non-aligned worlds. Lennier apologies to Sinclair, as he had learned that the Wind Swords had harbored Jha'dur, and if that information were to come out in the open, it would cause great problems on Minbar.

As Jha'dur's transport to Earth is re-established, a Drazi military vessel arrives, followed by several ships from the non-aligned worlds. They threaten to fire upon Babylon 5 if Jha'dur is allowed to go free. Sinclair offers their representatives a compromise, explaining about the immortality drug and allowing their scientists to participate in its development, after which Earth will turn Jha'dur over to them. They agree, and their ships are called off. Sinclair sees Jha'dur one last time before she leaves for Earth, explaining the deal. She tells him that the immortality drug's principal component requires the death of another, and she sees its success as her legacy: namely that the other races will turn on each other like wolves, and become savages as has she. As Sinclair and the other ambassadors watch her ship leave with escorts, they are surprised when a Vorlon ship appears out of the jump gate and destroys Jha'dur's ship. Vorlon ambassador Kosh, who has joined the others, tells them that they are "not ready for immortality", and walks off.

Separately, Kosh has asked Talia Winters to help with negotiations with a man known as Abbut. Talia finds that she is unable to read anything from Abbut with her telepathic abilities, and as she listens in, he and Kosh speak in seemingly nonsense phrases. As the negotiations go on, Talia finds herself experiencing visions, which culminate in one traumatizing one, re-experiencing the attack of a man she was previously investigating. Frightened out of the vision, she finds that Abbut has concluded his deal: he takes a data crystal out of his cybernetic brain and gives it to Kosh then departs. Talia talks to Garibaldi and Sinclair about the incident, and they tell her Abbut is a known "vicar" (short for VCR, or video cassette recorder: a person with implants allowing them to record thoughts). They suspect that Kosh, who is normally distrustful of telepaths, may have used Abbut to gain information on Talia's own weaknesses to use against her in the future.

== Production, visual and sound effects ==
=== Casting ===
The role of Jha'dur was played by English actress Sarah Douglas who is known for playing the Kryptonian villain Ursa in the Superman film series, and Queen Taramis in Conan the Destroyer. Douglas also played Pamela Lynch is the drama series Falcon Crest.

The character of Earth Senator Hidoshi, who appears three times in Season 1, was played by actor and singer-songwriter Aki Aleong.

Ambassador Kalika of the Abbai race was played by Robyn Curtis, who is known for portraying Lieutenant Saavik in Star Trek III: The Search for Spock and in Star Trek IV: The Voyage Home, as well as performing in a number of stage productions and television series. Robyn Curtis had earlier appeared in the 1993 comedy film Hexed, which had starred Babylon 5 main cast member Claudia Christian. Ironically Christian and Curtis had no scenes together in either production.

The role of Abbut was played by Californian actor Cosie Costa.

=== Makeup ===
The Babylon 5 makeup department involved in this episode – consisting of Everett Burrell, Greg Funk, Mary Kay Morse, Ron Pipes and John Vulich – won the 1994 Emmy Award for Outstanding Individual Achievement in Makeup for a Series for episode 5 of the season, 'The Parliament of Dreams'

=== Visual effects ===
For its visual effects scenes, Babylon 5 pioneered the use of computer-generated imagery (CGI) scenes – instead of using more expensive physical models – in a television series. This also enabled motion effects which are difficult to create using models, such as the rotation of fighter craft along multiple axes, or the rotation and banking of a virtual camera. The visual effects were created by Foundation Imaging using 24 Commodore Amiga 2000 computers with LightWave 3D software and Video Toaster cards, 16 of which were dedicated to rending each individual frame of CGI, with each frame taking on average 45 minutes to render. In-house resource management software managed the workload of the Amiga computers to ensure that no machine was left idle during the image rendering process.

Visual effects team leader Ron Thornton, who worked on both Babylon 5 and Star Trek episodes during his career, wrote that the Babylon 5 visual effects budgets were around one tenth of the corresponding Star Trek budgets, but that Babylon 5 effects were "much more fun to do."

The design for the Drazi Sunhawk warship, was created by Thornton. Thornton had created physical models for the BBC series Blake's 7 in the early 1980s, and based the Sunhawk design on Blake's ship, Liberator. Thornton had for many years wanted to create an updated and more streamlined version of Liberator, indicating, "When they did a reimagining of the Enterprise [for Star Trek: The Motion Picture] – streamlining and generally making it look sexier – it got me thinking about what the Liberator would look like if you did that."

The saucer-shaped alien ships, which emerge from Babylon 5's jump gate and threaten to fire on the station, were also designed by Thornton, containing animated rotating sections, with oversized guns added "for a giggle". Thornton indicated that his design philosophy he always tried to follow was "good physics with a pinch of artistic license." Straczynski wrote that he thought the saucers were "cool", but that they needed a little more weight and substance, with some more detail.

The Ishka ship with the globe-shaped power source in the center was also created by Thornton, who wrote that Straczynski had originally wanted the it to be ball-shaped. Thornton was afraid that it would look "a bit like a mini Death Star", but reduced the sphere in size to become a central power source. Thornton also designed the ship so that he could make it quickly, as some of the ships had to be designed in one day or less.

=== Sound ===
Music for the title sequence and the episode was provided by the series' composer, Christopher Franke. Franke developed themes for each of the main characters, the station, for space in general, and for the alien races, endeavoring to carry a sense of the character of each race. The voice of the Vorlon ambassador Kosh was also designed by Franke, with the character voiced by Ardwight Chamberlain.

== Writing and storyline significance ==
The episode was written by Larry DiTillio, who wrote four season 1 episodes and three for season 2. DiTillio also contributed to the series Murder, She Wrote, alongside Straczynski.

As Babylon 5 was conceived with an overall five-year story arc, the episode was written as both an individual story and with another level, where the hints of the larger story arc were given. The series' creator, J. Michael Straczynski indicates that the episodes can be watched for the individual stories, the character stories, or the story arc.

This episode reveals more about how Babylon 5 fits into the political structures of the series. It reveals how the Earth Alliance's defeat of the Dilgar gave Earth a sense of self-importance among the other races. It also shows how the races of the League of Non-Aligned Worlds, whilst easily divided, have significant power – which they are quick to use – when united. The episode also develops the concept of the mysterious Minbari Warrior Caste – about which the series has revealed very little previously – and the Wind Swords clan, who seem to know about Commander Sinclair.

== Reviews ==
Rowan Kaiser, writing in The A.V. Club, writes there are problems with the premise that the immortality serum requiring the death of another to work, including that the science would essentially be magic. Notwithstanding, he writes, "View the episode as a parable, however, a structure for a story to generate tension, and it's superb. We learn more about each race, and the ambassadors for each race, in symmetrical fashion." He continues, "'Deathwalker' is also more entertaining than most of the episodes surrounding it. It's not subtle ... but subtlety isn't always necessary. Let the characters make speeches, let them debate Platonic ideals like 'Justice or immortality. An intriguing choice.'"

Elias Rosner, writing in the entertainment magazine website Multiversity Comics, notes how Jha'dur is portrayed as nothing but purely evil. "Deathwalker is easily the most unambiguously evil character in Babylon 5 so far ... none have (so far) been motivated by pure spite and the desire to see the whole universe suffer." He observes, "Deathwalker asks us to ponder is a question that we as humanity have to ask ourselves too often: What do we do with the monster and their creations?"

Rosner also points out how the episode shows how the mere promise of immortality gave a single individual control over not only one major power, but many: "Think about it. By dangling the idea of immortality in front of the Narn, Earth Alliance, and the Babylon 5 Station Command, she controlled all their actions, almost brought war to the station, and forced Command to make terrible choices".

Jules-Pierre Malartre, writing in the science fiction review site, Den of Geek, comments that 'Deathwalker' made the viewer want to see more of the Dilgar, and the war they waged on the other worlds. Malartre highlights the risk of progress at the expense of our humanity: "'Deathwalker' is a very good argument of the cost of scientific advancement on the moral values of a civilisation. It's one of the grittiest episodes of season 1 and Sarah Douglas ... in the title character offers up the best genre performance of her career." He observes, "The final intervention of the Vorlon may leave some people feeling cheated of an actual ending, but a lot of viewers won't fail to see the irony of that ending ... Watching this episode made you feel like you were reading a good, hard sci-fi novel, and not merely some space opera fluff.
