= The Parliament of Dreams =

- Babylon 5 episode
- Episode no.: Season 1 Episode 5
- Directed by: Jim Johnston
- Written by: J. Michael Straczynski
- Production code: 108
- Original air date: February 23, 1994

Guest appearances
- Julia Nickson as Catherine Sakai; Thomas Kopache as Tu'Pari

Episode chronology
← Previous "Infection"	Next → "Mind War"

"The Parliament of Dreams" is the fifth episode of the first season of the science fiction television series, Babylon 5. It covers an attempt to assassinate the Narn ambassador G'Kar, and the station crew's hosting of a week-long festival of religious traditions of different races, organized by the Earth Alliance.

The Babylon 5 makeup team won an Emmy Award for the special alien prosthetic design for this episode.

== Title ==
The original title of the episode was "Carnival", being later changed to "The Parliament of Dreams". The title refers to the festival of religious and cultural practices held on the station. Showrunner J. Michael Straczynski explained, "A parliament is a gathering of representatives, in this case the representatives of various belief systems; the dreams are the religions themselves."

== Plot ==
The Earth Alliance arranges a week-long festival of religious and cultural exchange on Babylon 5. The Centauri celebrate with a lavish party, commemorating the victory of the Centauri over the other sentient life on their world, the Xon. At the end of each year, they look around and count how many of them survived and they celebrate their good fortune (rather than mourn those who have been killed). The Minbari host a session of prayers, a rebirth ceremony wherein the "old" self is "killed" and a new and better one is reborn.

A courier brings word to the Narn ambassador, G'Kar that an old political rival of his, Du'Rog, is arranging to have him assassinated. A paranoid G'Kar first suspects his new diplomatic attache, Na'Toth, but learns too late that the true assassin is the courier himself, the Thenta Makur member Tu'Pari. Shortly after, Tu'Pari begins subjecting G'Kar to a torture session mandated by terms of the assassination contract. Na'Toth discovers the assassin and intervenes, beating G'Kar in order to appear allied with Tu'Pari, but in actuality, deactivating the torture-inducing binds. G'Kar then easily captures Tu'Pari and then arranges for him to remain unconscious until his commission's deadline has passed, and depositing a large sum of money in his account to make it look like he was bribed into violating his commitment. Since the guild penalty for that is death, G'Kar and Na'Toth encourage him – with relish – to flee.

Jeffrey Sinclair meets an old flame, Catherine Sakai, and rekindles their on-off romantic relationship, before hosting a celebration of Earth religion in which he introduces the major station personnel to a line of people, all of different faiths (starting with an atheist)—the line extends some distance all the way to the final credits.

== Production, visual and sound effects ==
=== Cast and filming ===
This episode featured two guest artists: Thomas Kopache played Narn assassin Tu'Pari, while Julia Nickson played the role of Catherine Sakai. Two regular characters, Lennier and Na'Toth, were also introduced.

Minbari diplomatic aide Lennier, was played by Bill Mumy, who as a child actor had played Will Robinson in the Lost in Space television series. Straczynski described his performance:

He brings a wonderful sense of absolute innocence ... the proverbial innocent abroad ... The Minbari prosthetics look great on him, enhancing the sense he brings to the character. He's also great with the cast, and keeping things up during shooting. At one point, as they're leaving camera, Delenn says to Lennier, who has just arrived at the station, "Now tell me of home; I have been away far too long." His ad-libbed off-camera response: "Beatlemania is back."

Narn diplomatic aide Na'Toth was played by actress and musician Julie Caitlin Brown. Following the departure from the series of Mary Woronov – the actress who had played G'Kar's previous aide, Ko'Dath – Susan Kellermann had been cast as Na'Toth. Kellerman withdrew after difficulties with the heavy alien prosthetics, throwing the filming schedule into disarray. Producer Douglas Netter got on the phone in an attempt to get a replacement actress, and by lunchtime of that day, he had secured Brown as a replacement.

Brown sat down with Straczynski, asking who the character was to him, and then came up with a portrayal to suit Na'Toth. The fighting scenes involving Na'Toth had already been filmed using a stunt double. However, Brown persuaded the production team to reshoot the sequences using her, instead of the double, saying that scenes filmed with a double result in a product where it can obviously be seen that it isn't the main actor. Brown got carried away during the sequences involving high kicks, and accidentally kicked the camera whilst filming.

Andreas Katsulas, who played G'Kar opposite Brown said, "She took it all on, and [the prosthetics] can be so disconcerting. Suddenly, someone who's very animated can become very withdrawn because they feel they can't move. She went with it, and we had good chemistry. She knew she needed something strong to work with me."

Brown's character Na'Toth would be played by Mary Kay Adams in season 2; however, Brown reprised the role in season 5.

During the episode, Sinclair is listening to Ulysses by Tennyson. Sinclair had previous quoted the same poem in "The Gathering", and lines from the poem appear in future seasons.

The final scene where Sinclair introduces a long line of Earth people, followers of different religions, was filmed with 160 extras on October 16, 1993. Straczynski indicated that of the characters in the line, some extras were actually who they appeared to be, and some weren't. The actor playing the Jewish rabbi was actually a biker with tattoos all over his arms. Actor Michael O'Hare only had half an hour to memorise the list of names. As he was raised as a Catholic, he made the second one a Catholic priest with the name Father Chrisanti, named after his mother's maiden name. Straczynski wrote,

It's a very impressive, and very moving shot ... It's the kind of shot you just don't see anywhere else. We had some people from PTEN and a film crew for a behind-the-scenes piece on hand, and they all commented on how only this show would do this shot ... and how significant it is.

=== Makeup and Emmy Award ===
The Babylon 5 makeup department involved in this episode – consisting of Everett Burrell, Greg Funk, Mary Kay Morse, Ron Pipes and John Vulich – won the 1994 Emmy Award for Outstanding Individual Achievement in Makeup for a Series for this episode.

Makeup for the series was provided by Optic Nerve Studios, a company founded by John Vulich and Everett Burrell, in a garage in Granada Hills, California, in 1989. Their vision was to do makeup "with an eye towards new ideas technology". Vulich and Burrell had been contacted by Babylon 5 producer John Copeland, as they had known Ron Thornton, Babylon 5's visual effects designer, from their previous involvement with NewTek and Video Toaster.

Most of the alien prosthetics had been originally designed by Steve Burg for the pilot episode. Vulich and Burrell got together a team and set about re-making some of the alien characters, beginning with Kosh, G'Kar, Londo and Delenn. They eventually created a huge stock library of aliens that were re-used throughout the season. Burrell wrote,

With only a few months prep it was all hands on deck sculpting, moulding and painting our little hearts out. Both John Vulich and I had a great relationship with Ron Thornton and Kevin Kutchaver ... We collaborated on many things, and it was that type of collaboration that was so rare and unique that I have never seen it again. We all truly loved the opportunity we were given to do a great science fiction show and paid homage to Star Trek, UFO and Space 1999.

Filming for the series began in the summer of 1993. The makeup team's schedule included custom make-ups for each episode, and producing face casts of actors for prosthetics which needed to be on camera in three days. Burrell wrote,

Some of the early episodes killed us like "Parliament of Dreams" from season one. None of us slept for 4 weeks getting that show ready on time. It was all fun and intense at the same time but [Straczynski] wanted more and we delivered on a very small budget every time as did the likes of Foundation Imaging, Kevin Kutchaver and Mitch Suskin. It was truly the best of times and it was the worst of times.

Burrell recalls finding out about their Emmy Award win:

We were non-union and Star Trek had won seven years in a row. So I, John Vulich, Mary Kay Morse, Ron Pipes and Greg Funk were all nominated and went to the big show. It was very weird to hear our names announced along with the other shows especially Star Trek. Then it came "And the winner is ...... Babylon 5". Holy crap!!! We were all in shock that we had won. We had broken the Star Trek streak and we were low budget and a non-union show. Good for us bad for the politics back at the B5 stages ... we were under the microscope ... bigtime.

=== Visual effects ===
For its visual effects scenes, Babylon 5 pioneered the use of computer-generated imagery (CGI) scenes – instead of using more expensive physical models – in a television series. This also enabled motion effects which are difficult to create using models, such as the rotation of fighter craft along multiple axes, or the rotation and banking of a virtual camera. The visual effects were created by Foundation Imaging using 24 Commodore Amiga 2000 computers with LightWave 3D software and Video Toaster cards, 16 of which were dedicated to rending each individual frame of CGI, with each frame taking on average 45 minutes to render. In-house resource management software managed the workload of the Amiga computers to ensure that no machine was left idle during the image rendering process.

=== Music ===
Music for the title sequence and the episode was provided by the series' composer, Christopher Franke. Franke developed themes for each of the main characters, the station, for space in general, and for the alien races, endeavoring to carry a sense of the character of each race. The song which G'Kar sings in his quarters, while preparing his meal before the assassin Tu'Pari arrives, was specifically written by Franke for this episode.

== Writing ==
As Babylon 5 was conceived with an overall five-year story arc, the episode was written as both an individual story and with another level, where the hints of the larger story arc were given. The series' creator, J. Michael Straczynski indicates that the episodes can be watched for the individual stories, the character stories, or the story arc.

The script for this episode juggles three different storylines and introduces two new members of the cast, Lennier and Na'Toth, in addition to introducing the recurring character Catherine Sakai. Straczynski writes,

I'm very fond of "The Parliament of Dreams", which is a very funny show, and at times a very emotional show. "Parliament" is all over the place ... it's got all of our major characters, our ambassadors, their seconds, we see lots of group scenes, we're all over the station, dipping in and out of three different but interconnected stories ... it's really a matter of keeping a lot of balls in the air at one time, and I think we pulled it off nicely.

== Reviews ==
Rowan Kaiser writes in The A.V. Club:

The theme of transcendence runs through "The Parliament Of Dreams" as well ... in the Minbari ceremony, which is described as being about rebirth: specifically, rebirth through struggle. Both transcendence and mystery are key components to religion, which leads to the inevitable conclusion: ... that Babylon 5 is about religion. This may help explain the show's archetypal characterization, the sometimes-stilted dialogue, and massive ambition ... But looking at it as an examination of religion—by an avowed atheist, no less—is an effective and fascinating lens.

Kaiser writes that the final scene where Commander Sinclair introduces the alien ambassadors to hundreds of representatives of different Earth religions, is another demonstration of this transcendence and mystery, labelling it as "one of the most memorable of the series."

Elias Rosner, writing in Multiversity Comics, singles out Julie Caitlin Brown's performance as Na'Toth. He writes, "From the second she's on screen, is a breath of fresh air and Julie Caitlin Brown absolutely nails it ... Her wit is razor sharp and her delivery is just deadpan enough to be funny. She acts as a perfect foil to G'Kar's flustered, prideful, energetic, and sometimes childish personality."
