= Midnight on the Firing Line =

- Babylon 5 episode
- Episode no.: Season 1 Episode 1
- Directed by: Richard Compton
- Written by: J. Michael Straczynski
- Production code: 103
- Original air date: January 26, 1994

Guest appearances
- Paul Hampton as The Senator; Peter Trencher as Carn Mollari

Episode chronology
← Previous "The Gathering"	Next → "Soul Hunter"

"Midnight on the Firing Line" is the first episode of the first season of the science fiction television series, Babylon 5, following the pilot movie, "The Gathering". It first aired on January 26, 1994. It was notable for being the first regular television episode which used computer-generated imagery rather than physical models for its special visual effects. The episode also marked the beginning of the first science fiction television series where the entire series had an overarching storyline, which the writer J. Michael Straczynski described as "a novel for television".

== Title ==
According to Straczynski, the title refers to his feelings about the episode and the series. The studio had told him, "Well, we've got a pilot, we don't know if the market will sustain more than one space SF series, no other SF series has done well lately ... maybe we ought to air the pilot first, and get the ratings, before committing to a series." Straczynski wrote, "I knew we'd come under considerable fire, figured it was cool." He also mentions that the title is related to a line in a song by Harry Chapin, "and if our future lies on the firing line, are we brave enough to see the signals and the signs".

== Plot ==
Narn warships attack the Centauri agricultural colony at Ragesh 3. Centauri ambassador Londo Mollari, whose nephew Carn is among those at the colony, accosts the Narn ambassador G'Kar. G'Kar claims to have only learned of the attack, but states that it is part of the Narn effort working to reclaim their colonies taken during the Narn-Centauri conflict. Londo attempts to sway the Centauri government to issue a military response, but they refuse, and instead he is forced to issue formal charges against the Narn. Londo's aide, Vir Cotto, asks Londo about his hatred towards G'Kar, and Londo recalls a vision of how he will die, on the Centauri homeworld in twenty years, with both he and G'Kar choking the lives out of each other. Meanwhile, G'Kar reaches out to Commander Jeffrey Sinclair requesting Earth's help to back the Narn, reminding Sinclair that Narn offered to arm Earth during the Minbari wars. Sinclair wants to call the Babylon 5 Advisory Council and the League of Non-Aligned Worlds to take a stance on the matter, but is told by his government that with the Earth election happening that day, they do not want Sinclair to get Earth involved.

Meanwhile, the station's new telepath from the Psi Corps, Talia Winters, has been attempting to report to Lieutenant Commander Susan Ivanova, but Ivanova has avoided her. Security chief Michael Garibaldi learns of attacks being made on transport ships by raiders, and during one investigation, finds they are using more powerful weapons than previously. He links the attacks to a data theft from a transport ship company, including the schedule they use for the jump gates, which allows the raiders to know when and where to attack. Garibaldi debriefs Sinclair, as the only transport not yet attacked will be carrying refugees. Sinclair gets an idea, and instructs Ivanova to take over the diplomatic meeting while he joins the party to stop the raiders.

At the meeting, G'Kar plays a video recording from Ragesh 3, where Londo's nephew Carn states that the Narn were invited to come to the colony, which thus ends Londo's charges. A furious Londo assembles components from his quarters which create a gun, and heads towards G'Kar's quarters. He runs into Talia, who senses Londo's motives and warns Garibaldi, who stops Londo before he can fire the weapon.

Sinclair leads a fighter squadron from Babylon 5 to protect the last transport, destroying several raider ships and chasing off the rest. Sinclair follows his hunch and tracks down the command and control ship from which raiders were launched. Back at Babylon 5, Sinclair shows the gathered staff and G'Kar that the command and control ship was selling Narn weapons, something he had recalled from his earlier conversation with G'Kar, and had data crystals confirming that the Narn attack on Ragesh 3 was unprovoked, and that Carn was coerced into speaking under gunpoint. Sinclair instructs G'Kar to have Narn leave Ragesh 3 or he will formally report his findings to the Council.

At the end of the day, Ivanova thanks Talia for her help, and explains her trepidation towards telepaths, as her mother had been an unregistered telepath. To comply with the law, the Psi Corps had to inject her with chemicals that caused her to lose her sanity and eventually commit suicide. Ivanova hopes she can strike a better friendship with Talia.

== Writing and story arc significance ==
As the series' creator, Straczynski felt very close to the project, and felt that aside from perhaps wanting more sets to be available for the episode, there wasn't really anything about the episode that he would tweak. He was particularly interested in the effect of characters lying onscreen, with the unsuspecting audience finding out about it over time. He writes,

At one point, Garibaldi confronts Londo with this as reason for why he doesn't trust the Centauri. Londo shrugs it off as a "clerical error". There will be a few points in the series when we'll get information, and we'll buy into it ... and discover after a while that that character bald-facedly lied to the other character (and, by proxy, to us).

As Babylon 5 was conceived with an overall five-year story arc, the episode was written as both an individual story, and with another level, where the hints of the larger story arc were given. The series' creator, J. Michael Straczynski, indicates that the episodes can be watched for the individual stories, the character stories, or the story arc. He writes,

In the case of "Midnight", can you follow that show and enjoy it absolutely on its own terms? I believe that is the case. There's another level there, the "little clues and hints" ... which will just skate past most casual viewers and not in any way interfere with their viewing of the episode ... but if you're paying attention, and you catch them, it adds a new level. The more you see, the more you begin to perceive that second level. It's a cumulative effect that doesn't diminish the single episodes as stand-alones.

The series story arc develops in this episode through the introduction of the Narn-Centauri conflict, with the Centauri having oppressed and enslaved the Narn people for many years. Now that the Centauri are in decline, the angry Narn attack a defenceless Centauri colony. Londo's dream, that he and G'Kar will strangle each other to death, will also become significant.

Straczynski explains that the conflicts of this episode will be mirrored in the key episode The Coming of Shadows, these episodes focussing on the main questions that Babylon 5 addresses: "What is important to you? What are you willing to sacrifice? How far are you willing to go to get what you want? The episode introduces the main character Lieutenant Commander Susan Ivanova, and reveals her vulnerability resulting from her family's past encounters with the Psi Corps, the controlling organization for telepaths in the Earth Alliance. Also introduced are Talia Winters, a commercial telepath with the Psi Corps, and Centauri ambassador Londo Mollari's diplomatic aide, Vir. Straczynski writes that Vir is intentionally appears obsequious at the beginning, to give the character room to develop, as he slowly begins to stand up to Londo.

== Production ==
=== Cast and filming ===
This episode saw some changes in the main cast, with the characters of Lt Commander Laurel Takishima, Dr Benjamin Kyle and Lyta Alexander having left after the pilot episode. This necessitated some changes in the storyline, for originally Takishima was going to be the character who was to shoot Garibaldi in the back in the final episode of the season.

The appearance of Minbari ambassador Delenn – which had originally been envisaged as being male – was softened and made more feminine, which relieved the actress, Mira Furlan. Referring to the difference between the heavy prosthetics of the pilot, and this episode, Furlan stated, "[It] was a whole different experience... I enjoyed having my mouth, my nose, my cheeks, my neck. It was still a lot to deal with, but it brought me back to myself somehow."

During the filming of the scene at the end where Delenn, and Garibaldi – played by Jerry Doyle – watch the cartoon, Duck Dodgers in the 24½th Century, Furlan picked up a kernel of popcorn, carefully examining it. Doyle said that another actor might have just started eating, but that she did that because Delenn – having never seen popcorn before – was intrigued by what the food was. Doyle said that his laughter in that scene was more because of Furlan's spin on it than because of the cartoon.

Actress Andrea Thompson – playing telepath Talia Winters – admitted to being rather nervous for the shooting of her first scene. In the first take, she mistakenly said, "I'm Talia Winters, licensed commercial psychopath," much to the amusement of Claudia Christian – playing Ivanova – and the rest of the crew, who broke into laughter. Thompson stated that she had to join them laughing, as it was rather humorous, and that it broke the ice, and they then went on to shoot the scene.

According to Straczynski, the photo of the Earth Alliance president Luis Santiago shows executive producer Douglas Netter, and wardrobe designer Ann Bruice is shown as the candidate running against him in the election.

=== Visual effects ===
This episode marked the first time a regular episode in a television series used computer-generated imagery for all its visual effects. Other than interior sets, Babylon 5 did not use physical models for its scenes involving space and spacecraft exteriors. The visual effects were created by Foundation Imaging using 24 Commodore Amiga 2000 computers with LightWave 3D software and Video Toaster cards, 16 of which were dedicated to rendering each individual frame of CGI, with each frame taking on average 45 minutes to render. In-house resource management software managed the workload of the Amiga computers to ensure that no machine was left idle during the image rendering process.

For this episode, Straczynski wanted to open up the locations for the action, by showing more of the space environment where the station was located, and the Starfury fighters, which weren't ready at the time of the pilot episode. The Starfury was designed by Steve Burg as a function-driven design for a plausible zero-gravity fighter. The positioning of the four engine pods at the extremities of the craft was inspired by Ron Cobb's design for the Gunstar fighter from The Last Starfighter. The basic shape of the Starfury's wings was inspired by an earlier unused design by Burg for a military robot fighting machine, which he had originally designed for Terminator 2. This was merged with the multi-engined configuration to form the Starfury design. Burg points out that the wings/struts were not aerodynamic: they were there to lever the engines away from the center of mass. Despite having a similar wing configuration to the Star Wars X-Wing fighter, this was purely coincidental. Burg recollected, "Ron Thornton was the only person aware of the visual connection with the Terminator 2 walking machine. For obvious reasons, at the time I had compelling cause to keep the images under wraps. [T]he X-Wing is a very long needle shaped craft from most angles, whereas the Starfury is a very blunt shape. The X-Wing is also very much configured like a WWII fighter. Ideal for the Star Wars universe but not what we were going for on Babylon 5."

The "flip-and-fire" manoeuvre – where Sinclair's Starfury is seen using opposing thrusters to spin around and fire backwards – left a legacy on the 2004 Battlestar Galactica series, as Foundation Imaging visual effects supervisor Adam "Mojo" Lebowitz would later work on that series. Thornton recollected, "There were many nods to the B5 'Flip and Fire' manoeuvre... Seeing the old Cylon Raider design do a B5 Flip and Fire was awesome."

The Raiders' fighters were designed by Ron Thornton. He writes, "I stuck with that design to easily differentiate between the front and the back. It was also really economical - not many polygons which was good as a lot of them would appear on screen - and it was pretty iconic. So when fighting with Starfuries it was really easy to tell who was who."

=== Sound ===
Music for the title sequence and the episode was provided by the series' composer, Christopher Franke, a band member of Tangerine Dream. The voice effects for the Vorlon ambassador Kosh Narenek were also designed by Franke, with the character voiced by Ardwight Chamberlain.

== Commentary and reviews ==
Authors Ensley Guffey and Dale Koontz write that a recognized television trope – where an episode sets up events which will profoundly affect the later narrative – was named after this episode. The TV Tropes website used this episode title for this, until later being replaced by the term "innocuously Important Information." Guffey and Koontz observe that this opening episode starts to develop arguably the series' most significant ongoing relationships, with Londo and G'Kar mirroring the larger picture of Centauri and Narn politics, which will be for all five seasons at the core of Babylon 5. Narns have thrown off Centauri oppressors, and have become newly aggressive: their pent-up hatred over generations drives them forward, with a view to finally ending the Centauri. G'Kar strides into the picture – the manifestation of this aggression – proud, cunning, devious and willing to stop at nothing. The Centauri are in decline with their power waning and their prestige now a façade in tatters. "Everyone has an agenda, both personal and political, and intrigue and backroom deals are the order of the day," they continue, "This is the world of Babylon 5, the scene set in some 42 minutes. Let the games begin."

Rowan Kaiser, in the review website The A.V. Club, is impressed that the series is bold enough to bring together two main characters, Londo and G'Kar, who are deadly enemies. Kaiser writes about Londo's prophetic dream where he and G'Kar both die, their hands around each others' throats: "It says 'This will pay off. Keep watching.' Even though 'Midnight On The Firing Line' isn't the greatest episode—it's fine, with some good and a few bad moments—that promise, that conflict, suggests that Babylon 5 is far more ambitious than it seems." Kaiser considers this episode as deeply ironic: "What makes it interesting initially is how it sets up the core premise; what makes it interesting later on ... is how those premises get subverted by the events in the narrative. It's almost brilliant how perfectly some later episodes mirror this one."

Elias Rosner writes, in the Multiversity Comics website, "[T]his show proved that sci-fi TV could be something grander than an episodic adventure. The year is 2258. The name of the place is 'Babylon 5'." Rosner notes that this episode, "hits the ground running", introducing several major characters and plot exposition in the first seven minutes. He writes that the make-up and set design are stellar, G'Kar and Londo are show stealers, and that the show makes fictional politics interesting. He writes, "Straczynski ... shows his talent for long term planning and character work here. No plot thread feels unnecessary, with small payoffs that have the beginnings of something larger or large payoffs that are a necessity of the TV medium of the time."

Jules-Pierre Malartre, writing in the science fiction review site, Den of Geek, is particularly impressed by Peter Jurasik's performance as Londo. Malartre writes, "You simply have to love Jurasik for breathing so much life into Mollari with such memorable lines as: 'The Council? The Council can go to Hell. The emergency session can go to Hell. And YOU! You can go to Hell too! I-wouldn't-want-you-to-feel-left-out!'

Malartre comments on the dynamics between the characters of Londo and G'kar, noting that they will both undergo transformation throughout the course of the series, becoming the most nuanced and interesting characters in Babylon 5. He writes that their clash becomes central to the series' narrative, providing "a magnetic blend of humour, drama, and eventual brotherhood." He adds, "Their relationship provided some of the best character development moments and outstanding acting performances of the series."
