= Infection (Babylon 5) =

- Babylon 5 episode
- Episode no.: Season 1 Episode 4
- Directed by: Richard Compton
- Written by: J. Michael Straczynski
- Production code: 101
- Original air date: February 18, 1994

Guest appearances
- David McCallum as Dr. Vance Hendricks; Marshall Teague as Nelson Drake

Episode chronology
← Previous "Born to the Purple"	Next → "The Parliament of Dreams"

"Infection" is the fourth episode of the first season of the science fiction television series, Babylon 5. "Infection" was the first script written for a regular Babylon 5 episode, and involves the arrival aboard the station of an extremely powerful ancient bio-weapon created by the Ikarrans, a long-extinct alien race.

== Plot ==
Dr Vance Hendricks, a former college lecturer of Dr Franklin, visits him while he is checking on the cause of recent death of a Babylon 5 customs worker. Hendricks tells Franklin that while excavating the long-dead planet Ikarra VII for the corporation Interplanetary Expeditions, they had come across some artifacts that they determined were organic in nature, and something that humanity has been trying to develop themselves. Hendricks has Nelson, his assistant, bring the artifacts in, but Franklin expresses concern that they have not been properly put through quarantine; Hendricks assures him that they were processed prior to arriving on the station. As Nelson prepares the artifacts for examination, he is hit with an energy surge emanating from one of the artifacts. Over the next several hours, his body starts transforming, and unseen by the others, takes one of the devices and attaches it to himself.

The station staff, still investigating the sudden death of the customs worker, start to detect energy spikes on the station. Franklin and Hendricks realize that the Ikarra artifacts have infected Nelson and are transforming him into a weapon. Franklin studies the remaining artifacts to learn that the Ikarran people had developed these bio-weapons to fend off invaders to their planets, telling them protect the planet from anyone that was not a "pure" Ikarran. While the weapons held off the invaders, this instruction caused the weapons to turn on the Ikarrans since there was no such thing as a "pure" Ikarran. Nelson has now been transformed into one of these weapons, and will rampage through Babylon 5, gaining power over time.

Franklin explains the situation to Commander Sinclair while the station is being put into lockdown. Sinclair decides to face the weapon alone, explaining how they had wiped out their creators because they could not determine what a pure Ikarran was. The weapon pulls off the device from its armor and crushes it before collapsing, returning Nelson back to normal. Back in medbay, Franklin assures Nelson is fine, but confronts Hendricks knowing that he had instructed Nelson to smuggle the Ikarra artifacts aboard and that Nelson had deliberately killed the customs worker to do so. Hendricks is arrested, while EarthForce personnel arrive to acquire the weapons for their own bioweapons division.

Security Chief Michael Garibaldi confronts Sinclair about recklessly risking his life for the third time this year, saying that a lot of people who fought in the war came out without a purpose – looking for something worth dying for because they cannot find something worth living for.

An ISN news reporter finally gets the interview with Sinclair she had been waiting for, asking him whether – with what he's been through – humanity's continued presence in space is worth the effort. He replies that, when one day the sun will grow cold and go out, all of humanity's achievements and culture would end, unless humanity manages to go to the stars first.

== Writing ==
Straczynski, who wrote this episode first out of all the Babylon 5 scripts, felt that the episode was possibly the weakest episode in the season. As nearly a year had passed since the pilot episode had been filmed, he felt it was difficult to find the "fingerprints" of the characters again. Straczynski writes, "As on any show, it takes a while to get up to speed once you hit series. That was the real problem, and there wasn't any real way to get past it except to write it, re-acquaint myself with the characters, and move on. I probably would have opted out of doing it had we had more scripts on hand, but we didn't. And oddly, many on the production team liked the script quite a lot, and kept saying it had to be done."

Regarding Garibaldi confronting Sinclair, Straczynski recalled that people were startled by the scene, "Normally you don't ask the hero that question: what do you do it? He didn't have a good answer." O'Hare commented, "At that time in my life I was going through some particular things that were not related to the show at all, other parts of my life, in which I was very much looking for something to believe in. So much that I did believe in had disappointed me, so I identified with someone who's looking for something with some honor to it and was willing to risk his life over that."

Concerning "racial cleansing", Straczynski made a comparison with the McCarthy Hearings where there was an obsession with communists controlling the state, and in pursuing this, they themselves became the controlling interests which they feared: "No single race is one hundred percent pure of anything. There is a certain logic when he [Sinclair] says, 'When you become obsessed with the enemy, you become the enemy.'

=== Story arc significance ===
Straczynski wrote, concerning Sinclair's search for a reason to live, that it would tie in with his eventual destiny which would be revealed in Season 3, "He was someone casting about for a reason to live, and eventually he would find that: it would take him a thousand years of time travel to do it but he would eventually find that."

Ensley Guffey and Dale Koontz note that one of the story arc seeds introduced in the episode is ISN, the Interstellar News Network, which will become important later in the series, as Straczynski highlights the tension between a free press and media which is intrusive. Also introduced is Interplanetary Expeditions (IPX) – a corporation which aims to exploit archaeological alien technologies – which will reappear several times during the series. The other seeds in the episode are in the further development of the characters of Sinclair, Franklin and Garibaldi.

== Production ==
=== Cast and filming ===
This episode was the first Season 1 episode to be filmed – as it was the easiest one to shoot – in the Babylonian Productions premises, which was being converted from a warehouse into a studio.

Richard Biggs, who played a significant role in the episode as Dr Franklin, said, "It was terrible ... I was the new kid on the block on a Friday night. It was the last scene of the day. Everyone was under a lot of pressure. I had six lines on the Observation Deck, a lot of techno mumbo jumbo, and I hit my mark, and sixteen takes later they finally got it. I remember Michael O'Hare coming to me after sixteen takes: he patted me on the back and said (in a sarcastic tone), 'Welcome to Babylon 5.' "

Vance Hendricks was played by Scottish actor David McCallum, who is known for his portrayal of Soviet agent Kuryakin in The Man from U.N.C.L.E. Biggs recalled, "He was a quiet man ... He'd come to my trailer and say, 'How about this?' or 'How about that?' ... I wanted to point out that relationship. The characters were old friends–he was a teacher of mine–and I would have liked to have investigated those relations a little bit more."

Vance's assistant, Nelson Drake, was played by Marshall Teague, who would later in the series play the recurring character Ta'Lon. At the end of the series, Ta'Lon would take over from G'Kar as Narn ambassador to Babylon 5. Makeup designer Everett Burrell recalled the department dressing Teague up in the suit from the episode:

No one had seen it yet and it was pretty scary looking. So we found out that [producer John Copeland] and J.M.S were having some intense production meeting ... Teague who was in the suit kicked the door open right in the middle of the big meeting. Everybody there jumped up and tried to escape, including J.M.S. I peeked around the corner and Copeland's eyes were as big as saucers. I waited for him to either get mad or fire us, but he just started laughing ...

=== Visual effects and sound ===
For its visual effects scenes, Babylon 5 pioneered the use of computer-generated imagery (CGI) scenes – instead of using more expensive physical models – in a television series. This also enabled motion effects which are difficult to create using models, such as the rotation of fighter craft along multiple axes, or the rotation and banking of a virtual camera. The visual effects were created by Foundation Imaging using 24 Commodore Amiga 2000 computers with Lightwave 3D software and Video Toaster cards, 16 of which were dedicated to rending each individual frame of CGI, with each frame taking on average 45 minutes to render. In-house resource management software managed the workload of the Amiga computers to ensure that no machine was left idle during the image rendering process.

The Babylon 5 makeup department involved in this episode – consisting of Everett Burrell, Greg Funk, Mary Kay Morse, Ron Pipes and John Vulich – would win the 1994 Emmy Award for Outstanding Individual Achievement in Makeup for the next episode, The Parliament of Dreams.

Music for the title sequence and the episode was provided by the series' composer, Christopher Franke. Franke developed themes for each of the main characters, the station, for space in general, and for the alien races, endeavoring to carry a sense of the character of each race.

== Commentary and reviews ==
A Dream Given Form: The Unofficial Guide to the Universe of Babylon 5 comments on the interesting nature of this episode's monster-of-the-week format, in that one of the monsters is the press, embodied by abrasive ISN reporter Mary Ann Cramer, and the ISN flying drone cameras. The authors note the development of the characters of Franklin, Sinclair and Garibaldi. Franklin is depicted as a workaholic. Garibaldi is revealed as having been fired five times in different jobs for unspecified personal reasons, with the ISN reporter saying that Babylon 5 was his last chance to make good. Sinclair is called out by Garibaldi for again recklessly risking his life, as if trying to prove himself. Garibaldi suspects it is related to Sinclair's PTSD, one of the first occasions where PTSD and battle stress were elements in science fiction television. The authors continue, "At the end of 'Infection', the viewer is left with three dedicated, talented men whose heroism is matched by their frailty, and with an early education in Straczynski's own mastery of character as a driving force of storytelling. In Babylon 5 the stories are 'real' because the characters are.

Rowan Kaiser, writing in The A.V. Club, writes that, despite the poor plot, 'Infection' manages to salvage itself by the end of the episode, with a few defining character moments. He points out the scene where Garibaldi confronts Sinclair about his over-willingness to risk his life: "'I think they're looking for something worth dying for because it's easier than finding something worth living for.' It's not just an examination of the protagonist's motivations, it's also a reminder of just how bad The Battle Of The Line was, and how little we know about it."

Kaiser also highlights out the scene where Dr Franklin and Ivanova discuss the rising xenophobic sentiment on Earth, followed by a confirmation of their fears: EarthForce security arrives to confiscate the organic weaponry for its own bioweapons division. Kaiser writes, "Even though 'Infection' is a Star Trek-like episode, with a patriarchal captain solving a violent situation through diplomacy and application of logic, there's still a moment where Babylon 5 builds its darker, more serialized universe a tiny bit."

Elias Rosner, writing in Multiversity Comics, also points out the scene where Garibaldi calls out Sinclair on his death wish, as a "great, small moment of characterization." He writes, "While initially it didn't seem all that out of the ordinary, having [Garibaldi] vocalize it reframes these earlier actions ... [It] wasn't telegraphed as a, this is a problem, but instead stewed in the background and only someone who knows Sinclair for a long time, would have picked up on it."

Rosner sums up, "The politics of Earth start to catch up to Sinclair, a weapon based in eugenics is unleashed, and the corporations rear their ugly head. Welcome my friends. This is the story of the last of the Babylon stations."
