= List of She-Ra: Princess of Power episodes =

This article is a list of episodes from the television show She-Ra: Princess of Power in production order.

== Series overview ==
Season	Episodes	Originally released	
Season	Episodes	First released	Last released
1	65	September 9, 1985	December 6, 1985
Special		December 25, 1985	
2	28	September 13, 1986	December 12, 1987

== Episodes ==
=== Season 1 (1985) ===
No.	Title	Directed by	Written by	Original release date	Prod. code
1	"The Sword of She-Ra Part 1: Into Etheria" (Note: The first five episodes of She-Ra: Princess of Power were edited into the film The Secret of the Sword. The first five episodes were referred to by narration as "The Sword of She-Ra" for TV broadcasts.)	Gwen Wetzler	Larry DiTillio	September 9, 1985	67001
In Castle Grayskull, the Sorceress of Grayskull has a nightmare about a baby being kidnapped and taken to another world. Once she awakens, she finds the Sword of Protection—a weapon nearly identical to He-Man's Sword of Power—before her, and summons Prince Adam and Cringer to the castle. Adam and Cringer are sent through a newly opened portal and asked to find the person who shall wield the Sword of Protection; once they enter the portal, they find themselves on the world of Etheria in another dimension. In the village of Thaymor, the Eternians end up in a fight with a group of Horde Troopers—robotic enforcers of the Evil Horde who rule the planet—and are assisted by Bow and Kowl, members of the Great Rebellion. Bow and Kowl take Adam and Cringer to the Rebels' stronghold in the Whispering Woods, introducing them to their leader, Princess Glimmer. In the Fright Zone, Hordak is informed about a presence from another world by Shadow Weaver, and of the fight in Thaymor. To force the Rebels into surrendering, Hordak decides to capture Thaymor; sending his favorite Force Commander, Adora, to do the job, along with Catra, Leech, Scorpia, and Mantenna. The Rebellion chooses to fight back against the Horde, with Adam and Cringer changing into their alter-egos He-Man and Battle Cat to turn the tides of battle. During the fight, He-Man defeats Adora, only to realize that she is the one who will wield the Sword of Protection. He-Man is then shot from behind with a freeze-beam, and Adora claims the Sword in victory. Note: This episode features a different opening sequence due to the fact that She-Ra's identity is still unknown at this point in the storyline.
2	"The Sword of She-Ra Part 2: Beast Island"	Lou Kachivas	Larry DiTillio	September 10, 1985	67002
He-Man is taken to the Horde prison on Beast Island, where Hordak intends to find out why he has come to Etheria. There, he meets Adora again, still wielding the Sword of Protection. Adora claims that the Horde has brought peace to Etheria, and He-Man implores her to find out the truth. Bow, Glimmer, Kowl, Battle Cat, and Madame Razz launch a rescue mission to Beast Island, infiltrating the prison and outwitting the traps of the prison warden, Grizzlor, but are ultimately captured by Hordak. With help from Kowl, He-Man escapes his restraints and frees the Rebels, destroying the entire prison in the process. Meanwhile, Adora ventures into Etheria on her horse, Spirit, and witnesses the many atrocities committed by the Horde. Returning to the Fright Zone, she confronts Hordak and Shadow Weaver about deceiving her, but Shaodow Weaver knocks her unconscious with another spell, planning to examine the Sword she has been carrying. Note: This episode features a different opening sequence due to the fact that She-Ra's identity is still unknown at this point in the storyline.
3	"The Sword of She-Ra Part 3: She-Ra Unchained"	Bill Reed	Bob Forward	September 11, 1985	67003
Hordak creates a new weapon dubbed the Magna Beam Transporter, and plots to use it to teleport the Whispering Woods and the Rebellion into the inescapable Valley of the Lost—however, it must be first powered by the will of captured Rebels. In order to see Adora again, Adam transforms into He-Man and travels to the Fight Zone, unaware that Shadow Weaver and Hordak have spied on him doing so. He-Man approaches Adora, unaware that she has been brainwashed again by Shadow Weaver's magic. Adora alerts the guards and allows him to be apprehended, although is left unsure by her actions. The Sorceress contacts Adora through the Sword of Protection and reveals that Hordak kidnapped her when she was a baby, and that He-Man is really her brother. Under the Sorceress' instructions, Adora exclaims "For the Honor of Grayskull!" and transforms herself into She-Ra, freeing He-Man from the Magna Beam's charger. Together, they foil Hordak's attack on the Whispering Woods, and She-Ra inadvertently transforms Spirit into Swift Wind, a flying unicorn. Note: This episode features a different opening sequence due to the fact that She-Ra's identity is still unknown at this point in the storyline.
4	"The Sword of She-Ra Part 4: Reunions"	Marsh Lamore	Larry DiTillio	September 12, 1985	67004
He-Man and She-Ra land Swift Wind and contact the Sorceress, who explains Adora's origins. Long ago, the Horde had attacked Eternia, only to be repelled by King Randor and the magic of Castle Grayskull. In revenge, Hordak and his pupil Skeletor attempted to kidnap Randor's newborn twins, although Hordak was only able to take Princess Adora and abandoned Skeletor, who in return revealed Hordak's base on Snake Mountain. Ultimately, Hordak was able to escape into a portal, and, unable to find where Hordak went, the Sorceress cast a spell over Eternia to spare Adam and the kingdom the pain of Adora's loss. Now aware of their relationship, He-Man and She-Ra, as Adam and Adora, head back to the Whispering Woods, where Adora announces her defection from the Horde. Kowl and Bow inform them that Glimmer's mother, Queen Angella, is being held captive by Hunga the Harpy on Talon Mountain. To spare Glimmer from going herself, Adam and Adora go instead, rescuing Angella as He-Man and She-Ra. Angella is reunited with Glimmer, inspiring Adora to see her own parents. The Sorceress opens a portal for Adora, Adam and Cringer to return to Eternia, and Adora reunites with King Randor and Queen Marlena. Meanwhile, Hordak, having also entered the portal, makes his way to Snake Mountain and meets with Skeletor. The two villains fight, but ultimately agree to work together in order to kidnap Adora and return her to Etheria. Note: This episode presents for the first time the opening sequence that will run for the rest of the series.
5	"The Sword of She-Ra Part 5: Battle for Bright Moon"	Ed Friedman	Larry DiTillio	September 13, 1985	67005
Adora begins to catch up with her family, learning about their lives on Eternia. Their reunion is interrupted by Hordak, Skeletor, and the Evil Warriors, who infiltrate the Royal Palace and abduct Adora back to Snake Mountain. Skeletor betrays Hordak and sends him back to Etheria, intending to use the Princess as a hostage against King Randor. Adora, however, escapes her captors and transforms into She-Ra, defeating Skeletor and his henchmen just as He-Man, Man-At-Arms and Teela arrive to rescue her. Recognizing that Hordak will attack her family again, and that Etheria still needs to be freed of the Horde, Adora chooses to return to Etheria, although promises to return. He-Man tags along with Adora to help give the Rebellion in their effort to reclaim Brightmoon, Angella's kingdom. She-Ra discovers that she can communicate with animals, guiding the animals of Whispering Woods against the Horde, and can heal injuries, restoring Swift Wind when he is hit by a fatal blast from a Horde cannon. The Horde is soon driven out from the kingdom and celebration ensues, with He-Man and She-Ra promising to help the other in the future.
6	"Duel at Devlan"	Bill Reed	Steven J. Fisher	December 6, 1985	67006
Horde enforcer Dylamug and his Troopers begins tormenting the small village of Devlan, driving Krystala, the daughter of an innkeeper named Darius, to seek out the Rebellion for help. She-Ra saves Krystala from being hurt by one of the Horde's harvesting machines and learns of Devlan's plight. She-Ra agrees to help, although goes alone with Krystala, believing that it is important to help the villagers make a stand for themselves rather than having the entire Rebellion fight back. The villagers prove to be too frightened to resist the Horde, giving into Dylamug's demand of delivering all of their valuables. She-Ra battles against Dylamug and his Troopers, and Krystala and Darius are able to convince the villagers to make a stand for themselves. After She-Ra is knocked out by Dylamug, the villagers rally to defeat the villains, driving them away and joining the Rebels' cause. Note: This episode features the first appearance of Loo-Kee and him presenting the end of the episode moral (telling parents about being bullied). The moral lesson was missing from Episode 1 through 5 due to the episodes being the television presentation of "The Secret of the Sword". This was the 1st episode to air in the UK on Children's ITV.
7	"The Sea Hawk"	Bill Reed	Story by : Michael Chase Walker; Teleplay by : Larry DiTillio	September 16, 1985	67007
She-Ra rescues a group of Sea Elves from a sinking ship, and learns that they are being terrorized by a monster able to both fly and swim. The monster turns out to be the Solar Sailor; a flying ship captained by the pirate Sea Hawk and his first-mate, Swen, who are employed by the Horde. Deciding to handle things without her powers, Adora manages to catch a ride on the Solar Sailor, and tries to convince Sea Hawk that he and his men don't have freedom so long as they work for the Horde. At Horde Harbor, Catra and Grizzlor recognize Adora and force Sea Hawk to have her arrested, planning on handing her over to Hordak for a reward. Criticized by Swen for abandoning Adora, and realizing the truth in her words, Sea Hawk abandons the Horde and frees Adora from her prison, inadvertently allowing her to transform into She-Ra and defeat Catra and Grizzlor. For saving his life, Sea Hawk offers to give She-Ra any reward she wants, and is asked to change his ways. Sea Hawk agrees, becoming an ally of the Rebellion, while Adora notes that this is the beginning of a beautiful friendship between the two of them. Loo-Kee tells viewers to look for the good in people.
8	"The Red Knight"	Tom Sito	Mike Chain	September 17, 1985	67008
Adora, Bow, Glimmer and Kowl are ambushed by Leech, Mantenna and Scorpia, only to be saved by the enigmatic Red Knight, who joins them on their way to the Rebel's Fair—where, upon meeting him, Queen Angella remarks that his voice is incredibly familiar. Learning of the Fair through his spy, Imp, Hordak plots to kidnap Queen Angella while she is out in the open using his latest device, the Laser Bubble Blaster. At the Fair, Bow finds himself outmatched by the Red Knight in saving a runaway cart, and then at the Rebel's Run competition. Unable to handle his loss, Bow chooses to be alone, and is comforted by She-Ra, who tells him he can only lose if he gives up. At the same time, Hordak and his minions capture Angella, Glimmer, and the Red Knight. Kowl, witnessing this, informs She-Ra and Bow. She-Ra defeats Hordak's minions while Bow disables the Laser Bubble Blaster, forcing the villains to retreat. The Red Knight compliments Bow's abilities, and promises that he will return and reveal his true face on the day Etheria is freed from the Horde. Loo-Kee tells viewers that doing your best is what counts.
9	"The Missing Ax"	Richard Trueblood	Philip Kassel	September 18, 1985	67009
A tall tale about an axe-stealing thief leads Bow to Greenthatch, a town that has fallen under Horde rule. Mantenna appears. Loo-Kee tells viewers that its best to tell the truth.
10	"The Laughing Dragon"	Richard Trueblood	Michael Utvich	September 19, 1985	67010
In an attempt to help Sorrowful the cowardly dragon gain courage, She-Ra and her friends are forced to battle the Horde. First appearance of Castaspella and Sorrowful. Loo-Kee tells viewers that courage can be found within.
11	"The Peril of Whispering Woods"	Lou Kachivas	Francis Moss	September 20, 1985	67011
Hordak is visited by Prince Zed, the son of Horde Prime, and is humiliated when the Rebels steal back the Horde's tax collections before fleeing into the Whispering Woods. To counter the magic that keeps the Horde from entering the forest, Shadow Weaver devises a poison to kill off the Whispering Woods' trees. The Rebellion is unable to prevent the poison from spreading, and Madame Razz cannot find a cure without knowing the original spell—at the same time, the Rebels' allies, the Twiggets, start to become sick as the forest is damaged. During one of the Horde's attacks on the Whispering Woods, the Rebellion is able to capture Zed, whom She-Ra insists on treating with hospitality. Touched by the Rebels' mercy, and sympathetic to the Twiggets, Zed decides to help by messaging Hordak and threatening to tell his father about his capture if he doesn't stop poisoning the Woods. At the exchange between the Rebels and Horde, Prince Zed promises the Rebels to rule the Horde justly when he takes over from his father, while Madame Razz creates a cure from a sample of the poison. Hordak attempts to go back on the deal and destroy the Whispering Woods with a final poison attack, but, thanks to Razz's cure, it backfires, returning the Woods to normal. Loo-Kee tells viewers they should be nice to those who are nice to them.
12	"The Prisoners of Beast Island"	Ernie Schmidt	Michael Utvich	September 23, 1985	67012
Catra, Leech and Rattlor capture Sorrowful the dragon in an attempt to lure the Rebels to the Horde prison on Beast Island. Catra, Leech, Rattlor and Grizzlor appear. Loo-Kee tells viewers to be loyal to their friends.
13	"King Miro's Journey"	Ed Friedman	J. Michael Straczynski	September 24, 1985	67013
King Randor's father, King Miro, returns to the Royal Palace after hearing news of his granddaughter's return, travelling to Etheria with Adam to meet her. With the other Rebels busy, Adora, Razz, Broom and Kowl are left alone to prepare for the coming of Horde Inspector, with Adam and Miro decide joining in. The Horde Inspector, Darkney, presents Hordak with a new plan to destroy the Rebellion—using his Crystal Dome Generator to seal off the Whispering Woods and its inhabitants. The crystal dome is cast successfully over the Whispering Woods, but Razz, Miro, Broom and Kowl are successfully able to fight off the Horde's drones, while He-Man and She-Ra lift off the dome and destroy the generator. Miro and Adam soon return to Etheria, and Adora rides off happily on Spirit. Loo-Kee tells viewers that family is very important. Note: In this episode, Adora changes into She-Ra in front of Madame Razz and Broom, thus showing that Broom also knows that Adora is She-Ra.
14	"Friendship"	Richard Trueblood	Robert White	September 25, 1985	67014
After being called to rescue an old friend from the Horde, Adora is captured and taken to Beast Island, where the rebels must find Adora and rescue her. Loo-Kee tells viewers they are lucky to have friends like teachers and doctors.
15	"He Ain't Heavy"	Tom Tataranowicz	Bob Forward	September 26, 1985	67015
After Adam is captured by Hordak, Adora must become She-Ra to enter the Fright Zone and free her brother. Loo-Kee tells viewers they should only play with toys and not other dangerous things.
16	"Return of the Sea Hawk"	Tom Tataranowicz	Story by : Michael Chase Walker; Teleplay by : Larry DiTillio	September 27, 1985	67016
While rescuing a group of elves from Catra and Grizzlor, She-Ra winds up captured herself, leaving Sea Hawk to save the day. Loo-Kee tells viewers not to be afraid to tell someone that they like them.
17	"A Loss for Words"	Tom Sito	Story by : Drew Lawrence; Teleplay by : Robert Lamb, Francis Moss	September 30, 1985	67017
To stop Adora from speaking out in support of the Rebellion, Hordak and Shadow Weaver steal her voice. Unable to transform into She-Ra without it, Adora must get her voice back from Hordak and Shadow Weaver. Loo-Kee talks about freedom of speech.
18	"Horde Prime Takes a Holiday"	Marsh Lamore	Story by : J. Michael Straczynski; Teleplay by : Bob Forward	October 1, 1985	67018
Skeletor engages Hordak in a battle over possession of Horde Prime's flagship, the Velvet Glove. She-Ra, He-Man and Orko tell viewers about not letting someone else touch them in a bad way.
19	"Enchanted Castle"	Marsh Lamore	Story by : Philip Kassel; Teleplay by : Philip Kassel, Robert Lamb	October 2, 1985	67019
She-Ra and Bow seek the help of an old friend after being captured by Queen Mortella's warriors. Loo-Kee tells viewers that being kind to others can help them as well.
20	"Three Courageous Hearts"	Tom Sito	Story by : Lee Yuro, Linda Yuro; Teleplay by : Lee Yuro, Linda Yuro, Robert Lamb	October 3, 1985	67020
During the Annual Trickster Competition, Shadow Weaver casts a spell that sends She-Ra into the forgotten world of The Sixth Dimension. Loo-Kee tells viewers that they can be courageous too.
21	"The Stone in the Sword"	Marsh Lamore	Mike Chain	October 4, 1985	67021
Hordak attacks in his new weapon, the Doom Balloon, which manages to crack the stone in Adora's sword. Now unable to transform into She-Ra, Adora must go on a quest to restore it if she hopes to save Bow from the Horde. Loo-Kee tells viewers about sticktoitiveness.
22	"The Crystal Castle"	Steve Clark	Larry DiTillio	October 7, 1985	67022
Castle Bright Moon will be freed from a Horde takeover only if the king of the Trolls will reveal a secret to She-Ra. Loo-Kee tells viewers that being different is good.
23	"The Crown of Knowledge"	Marsh Lamore	Chris Weber	October 8, 1985	67023
A young boy goes on a dangerous adventure in search of the Crown of Knowledge. Loo-Kee tells viewers that searching for knowledge is one of life's greatest adventures.
24	"The Mines of Mondor"	Ernie Schmidt	Francis Moss	October 9, 1985	67024
When She-Ra and the rebels go to the rescue of a captured prince, they become trapped in the Mines of Mondor. Loo-Kee tells viewers that helping other makes you feel good.
25	"Small Problems"	Ed Friedman	Story by : Steven F. Fisher; Teleplay by : Larry DiTillio	October 10, 1985	67025
When Catra's shrinking formula takes effect, She-Ra, Glimmer, and Swift Wind are reduced in size. Loo-Kee tells viewers not to get a big head.
26	"Book Burning"	Ernie Schmidt	Story by : Leslie Wilson; Teleplay by : Francis Moss	October 11, 1985	67026
Freedom is threatened as Horde villains Tung and Rattlor begin to burn all the books in Etheria. Loo-Kee tells viewers that the freedom to read is a right that must never be taken away.
27	"The Eldritch Mist"	Steve Clark	Robert Lamb	October 14, 1985	67027
When Shadow Weaver casts a spell on the Whispering Woods, He-Man, She-Ra, and Castaspella are the only ones who must reverse this spell and save their friends. Loo-kee tells viewers to always ask for help if they get in trouble.
28	"Bow's Farewell"	Lou Kachivas	Don Heckman	October 15, 1985	67028
Catra takes aim to destroy Bright Moon with the powerful eclipse beam. Loo-Kee tells viewers that science is a lot to learn.
29	"The Price of Freedom"	Ed Friedman	Bob Forward	October 16, 1985	67029
He-Man becomes trapped in a mine as he risks his life to save innocent villagers from the Horde. Loo-Kee tells viewers that playing with fire is dangerous.: Adora is not in this episode. She is She-Ra for the whole episode
30	"Play It Again, Bow"	Tom Sito	Harvey Brenner	October 17, 1985	67030
An old man named Frit builds a monument to freedom that She-Ra must save from destruction by the Horde. Loo-Kee tells viewers that colors represent different people.
31	"The Reluctant Wizard"	Ernie Schmidt	Story by : Joseph Botsford; Teleplay by : Joseph Botsford, J. Michael Straczynski	October 18, 1985	67031
While Madame Razz and Broom are trying to escape from a Horde Trooper, they encounter an old tree, which shoots the Trooper down with a magical blast. Razz tells Bow, Adora and Kowl about the incident, remembering an old legend about a wizard who created his own world within a tree. Hearing about the incident and the legend, Hordak decides to find and destroy the wizard to ensure he is the only power on Etheria. The Rebels decides to investigate and recruit the wizard, facing many magical obstacles on their journey. Meeting the wizard, he refuses to help, transporting the Rebels into his tree when they insist on seeing him. Rather than fight, She-Ra convinces him that they mean no harm. The wizard unveils his true form and the beauty of his world, revealing that he sealed himself off from the world because people have only ever judged his ugly appearance, and returns the Rebels outside. The Horde attacks the wizard, draining his power using Shadow Weaver's Cloud of Doom spell. Although the wizard refused to help them, She-Ra helps him anyway, defeating the Horde with the Rebels. The wizard teleports himself away, choosing to think about She-Ra's words and advice. Bow questions the wizard's decision to leave, with She-Ra reminding him that the ability to make free choices is what they're fighting for. Loo-Kee tells viewers that if you can't say anything nice to a person then say nothing at all.
32	"Friends Are Where You Find Them"	Richard Trueblood	Don Heckman	October 21, 1985	67032
A powerful robot brought to Etheria from another galaxy falls into the hands of the Horde. Loo-kee tells viewers that people need other people.
33	"A Talent for Trouble"	Mark Glamack	Larry DiTillio	October 22, 1985	67033
When Orko and Madame Razz are captured by the Horde, He-Man and She-Ra must rescue their friends. Loo-kee tells viewers that helping people is a way of showing that you are their friend.
34	"Troll's Dream"	Bill Reed	Larry DiTillio	October 23, 1985	67034
Terror strikes all Etheria as the Spider of Crystal escapes from its prison in Skull Path. Loo-kee tells viewers to remember that getting enough sleep is part of good health.
35	"Gateway to Trouble"	Steve Clark	J. Michael Straczynski	October 24, 1985	67035
On Snake Mountain, Skeletor devises a new plan to use Modulok's Gatemaker device to transport the entire Royal Palace into Etheria to both dispose of his enemies and give Hordak more problems. However, fed-up with Skeletor's mistreatment, Modulok defects from the Evil Warriors and heads to Etheria to give Hordak the Gatemaker, followed by Skeletor. Simultaneously, Adora and Adam are meeting each other once again, and witness Skeletor's arrival. Transforming into He-Man and She-Ra, they confront the villain, forming a tenuous alliance when they learn about the danger the Gatemaker poses, although Skeletor quickly abandons it to head off on his own when annoyed by the kindness of the Whispering Woods. Modulok hands the device over to Hordak, who plots to invade Eternia using it. Hordak prepares to send a fleet of ships through one of the Gatemaker's portals, but is confronted by She-Ra and He-Man. Shadow Weaver summons an Electroid monster from the Gatemaker's electricity to battle the heroes, who defeat it, causing the Gatemaker to go out of control before exploding. The Sorceress opens up another portal for He-Man to return through, which Skeletor, who hid away during the previous battle, stubbornly refuses to enter until attacked by a group of Horde Troopers. Hordak's fleet arrive on a distant alien world, which they realize isn't Eternia. Loo-kee tells viewers that it's harder to get out of trouble than not. Note: This episode marks the first and final time a character from He-Man and the Masters of the Universe permanently crosses over into She-Ra, as Modulok was a recurring antagonist there before joining the Horde.
36	"The Unicorn King"	Marsh Lamore	Kathryn M. Drennan	October 25, 1985	67036
While testing his new Sea Fright submarine, Hordak accidentally uncovers the mythical Unicorn Island, which he plots to turn into a Horde base, sending Mantenna out to capture the Unicorn populace. Swift Wind is alerted to danger after transforming, thus making him and She-Ra seek out Light Hope, who informs them of the Horde's attack on Unicorn Island. Upon arriving, She-Ra and Swift Wind free the captive Unicorns, and meet the Unicorn King. The King refuses to fight the Horde, instead planning on relocating; also revealing his strong distrust of humans and a Unicorn named Bright Wing, whose wings were crippled when captured by a human who used magic. She-Ra heals Bright Wing to convince the Unicorn King that not all humans are evil, and that they should resist the Horde rather than abandon their home. Ordering Mantenna to act as bait, Hordak lures She-Ra away and casts a force-field over the island to imprison the Unicorns. She-Ra digs under the island to gain entry, and, with help from the Unicorn King, destroys the force-field generator and sinks the Sea Fright. Knowing they can rely on the Rebellion's help, the Unicorn King thanks She-Ra and agrees to stay and resist the Horde. Loo-Kee tells viewers about cooperation.
37	"The Anxious Apprentice"	Mark Glamack	Carol Baxter	October 28, 1985	67037
When Castaspella's young apprentice, Ariel, takes the Book of Spells, it ends up in the evil clutches of Scorpia. Loo-Kee tells viewers that practice makes perfect.
38	"Zoo Story"	Lou Kachivas	Story by : Mike Chain; Teleplay by : Mike Chain, Larry DiTillio, Francis Moss	October 29, 1985	67038
Kowl learns the real meaning of freedom when he's captured by Vultak and made a prisoner in Hordak's zoo. Loo-Kee tells viewers to concentrate on the good things you have.
39	"Into the Dark Dimension"	Bill Reed	J. Michael Straczynski	October 30, 1985	67039
Catra's Dark Blaster and Shadow Weaver's magic backfire and sends both Hordak and She-Ra into another dimension, and the hands of its ruler, the Dark One. Loo-Kee directly warns viewers to not try drugs.
40	"Treasure of the First Ones"	Marsh Lamore	Larry DiTillio	October 31, 1985	67040
Sea Hawk and his swashbuckling crew join She-Ra to try and save the Treasure of the First Ones from the tentacles of Octavia. Loo-Kee tells viewers about art.
41	"Glimmer's Story"	Ed Friedman	Don Heckman	November 1, 1985	67041
If She-Ra fails to recover the source of the protective power of Castle Bright Moon, the kingdom will fall to the Horde. Loo-Kee tells viewers that appearance is how you look on the outside.
42	"Enemy with My Face"	Richard Trueblood	J. Michael Straczynski	November 4, 1985	67042
Shadow Weaver creates a Melog, a humanoid made of mud and swamp grass, in the likeness of She-Ra. Loo-Kee tells viewers to treat people the way they treat you.
43	"Welcome Back, Kowl"	Bill Reed	Philip Kassel	November 5, 1985	67043
Kowl is suspected of being a Horde spy after a bag of Horde money is found under his pillow. Loo-Kee tells viewers that nobody's perfect.
44	"The Rock People"	Steve Clark	Larry DiTillio	November 6, 1985	67044
The Rock People come to Etheria in search of a new home and find a waiting foe in Hordak. Loo-Kee tells viewers that fighting doesn't solve a problem.
45	"Huntara"	Tom Tataranowicz	Larry DiTillio	November 7, 1985	67045
Hordak convinces a fierce warrior from the planet Silax that She-Ra is evil, and as a result, She-Ra and her friends are placed in great danger. Loo-Kee tells viewers that the truth always stays out of trouble.
46	"Micah of Bright Moon"	Bill Reed	Robert Lamb	November 8, 1985	67046
Micah, Glimmer's father and King of Bright Moon, escapes from fifteen years imprisonment by the Horde. Loo-Kee tells viewers that family is important to all of us.
47	"The Price of Power"	Marsh Lamore	J. Michael Straczynski	November 11, 1985	67047
She-Ra and Madame Razz help Norwin, a kindly old wizard, when his foolish apprentice places himself in the dangerous hands of Shadow Weaver. Loo-Kee tells viewers to learn from their mistakes.
48	"Birds of a Feather"	Mark Glamack	Story by : Leslie Wilson; Teleplay by : Francis Moss	November 12, 1985	67048
Kowl's evil cousin Red Eye makes Kowl the victim of a plot to overthrow the Rebellion. Loo-Kee tells viewers that everyone has a problem they need to solve.
49	"For Want of a Horse"	Mark Glamack	Bob Forward	November 13, 1985	67049
Shadow Weaver and Hordak scheme to capture Swift Wind and give him to Horde Prime for his birthday. Loo-Kee tells viewers to treat pets with kindness.: Adora is not in this episode. She is She-Ra for the whole episode.
50	"Just Like Me"	Tom Tataranowicz	Gene Ayres	November 14, 1985	67050
A little girl joins the fight for freedom and She-Ra helps teach her the power of teamwork. Loo-Kee tells viewers that everyone has powers like She-Ra.
51	"My Friend, My Enemy"	Richard Trueblood	Carol Baxter	November 15, 1985	67051
Skeletor puts Hordak under a spell, which will make him disappear forever unless someone can shed tears for him. But who would shed tears for a villain like Hordak? Loo-Kee tells viewers to try to be a friend when someone doesn't have a friend.
52	"The Wizard"	Lou Kachivas	Story by : Francis Moss; Teleplay by : Larry DiTillio	November 18, 1985	67052
Kowl and Broom go in search of courage but find trouble when they run into sinister Doctor Drome and his sidekick Acrobad. Loo-Kee tells viewers that hitchhiking is dangerous.
53	"Unexpected Ally"	Lou Kachivas	Bob Forward	November 19, 1985	67053
General Sunder must make a decision between his duty to the Horde and joining the valiant cause of the Rebellion. Loo-Kee tells viewers that everyone can change.
54	"The Light of the Crystal"	Tom Sito	Michael Utvich	November 20, 1985	67054
The Elf Prince Storm, Bow, and Glimmer are captured by Catra and forced to work as slaves in the Elves' Crystal Mines…can the Rebellion save them? Loo-Kee tells viewers that parents can be extra special to you.
55	"Loo-Kee Lends a Hand"	Mark Glamack	Robert Lamb	November 21, 1985	67055
When Hordak stops time in the Whispering Woods, Loo-Kee finds himself the only one not frozen and must travel to Eternia to enlist the help of He-Man. Loo-Kee tells viewers that being helpful is better than having powers like She-Ra and He-Man.
56	"Of Shadows and Skulls"	Ed Friedman	Story by : Michael Chase Walker; Teleplay by : Larry DiTillio	November 22, 1985	67056
When Shadow Weaver is insulted by Hordak, she allies herself with Skeletor to overthrow her master. But of course, Skeletor has no intention of maintaining his part of the bargain. Loo-Kee tells viewers that instead of getting revenge on someone try to forgive and forget.
57	"Jungle Fever"	Mark Glamack	Don Heckman	November 25, 1985	67057
Adora loses her memory during an escape from the Horde prison on Beast Island and unless she remembers how to transform into She-Ra, she will be no match for the Great Beast. Loo-Kee tells viewers to be kind to all animals.
58	"Black Snow"	Lou Kachivas	Larry DiTillio	November 26, 1985	67058
The white snow of the land of the Selkies is turned black by Modulok's Weather Wheel, but the blame is placed on Frosta. Loo-Kee tells viewers that it's no fun to be sick.: Adora is not this episode. She is She-Ra for the whole episode.
59	"Anchors Aloft, Part 1"	Ernie Schmidt	Bob Forward	November 27, 1985	67059
When Sea Hawk's ship, the Solar Sailor, is destroyed by Admiral Scurvy, Sea Hawk washes up on shore where he encounters a talking mouse named Davy Jones and is revealed a secret to his past. Loo-Kee tells viewers that friendship is more valuable than gold.
60	"Anchors Aloft, Part 2"	Bob Arkwright	Bob Forward	November 28, 1985	67060
Sea Hawk join forces with his father, The Falcon, to fight a fierce battle with Horde Admiral Scurvy who holds Adora captive. Loo-Kee tells viewers not to cheat on their test.
61	"Darksmoke and Fire"	Ernie Schmidt	J. Michael Straczynski	November 29, 1985	67061
Adora makes another trip to Eternia through the Dimensional Gate. But thanks to Modulok's new weapon, the gate goes out of control and she ends up in the middle of a battle between humans and dragons...a thousand years in Eternia's past! Loo-Kee tells viewers not to blame someone for what he or she did.
62	"Magicats"	Ed Friedman	J. Michael Straczynski	December 2, 1985	67062
Catra and She-Ra are accidentally transported to the underground cat world, Half Moon, where She-Ra finds herself in great danger once Catra falsely assumes the throne. Loo-Kee tells viewers not to litter.
63	"Flowers for Hordak"	Richard Trueblood	Bob Forward	December 3, 1985	67063
The Fright Zone is turned into a blooming paradise as Hordak seeks to rid himself of the rebel Perfuma who he has taken captive. Loo-Kee tells viewers to take time to enjoy flowers.
64	"Wild Child"	Bill Reed	Don Heckman	December 4, 1985	67064
She-Ra must solve the mystery of the ghostly White Fangs who seem to be haunting the area, before the Whispering Woods are destroyed. Loo-Kee tells viewers not to forget to eat their vegetables.
65	"The Greatest Magic"	Tom Tataranowicz	Larry DiTillio	December 5, 1985	67065
She-Ra and Orko make a desperate attempt to stop the terrible Dr. Zoog from carrying out his evil plans in Orko's home world of Trolla. Loo-Kee tells viewers that pets require a lot of care but return the love they are given.

=== Season 2 (1986–87) ===
No.	Title	Directed by	Written by	Original release date	Prod. code
66	"One to Count On"	Bill Reed	Karen Wilson, Chris Weber	September 13, 1986	67066
When Bow and Glimmer lead a group of rebels in an effort to recapture Queen Angella's stolen crown, Adora and Madame Razz begin to worry that the rebels are counting on She-Ra too much. Loo-Kee tells the viewers that stealing can catch up to you.
67	"Return of the General"	Richard Trueblood	Bob Forward	September 20, 1986	67067
When Hordak attacks Bright Moon, She-Ra must seek out ex-general Sunder, now a farmer who wants nothing to do with war, for help. When his family is captured, Sunder realizes that sometimes you must fight for freedom. Loo-Kee tells the viewers that family cares a lot about you.
68	"Out of the Cocoon"	Marsh Lamore	Don Heckman	September 27, 1986	67068
She-Ra is distributing food to the starving people of Sand Valley when she is captured by the evil Baron Condore. Unexpectedly, a plain young woman named Small One who metamorphoses into Flutterina rescues her. Loo-Kee tells viewers that even though a person is disabled they are special as he or she is.
69	"A Lesson in Love"	Ed Friedman	Phil Harnage	October 4, 1986	67069
Young Prince Kevin runs away from home and falls through a dimensional door, where he is captured by the Horde. Loo-Kee tells the viewers chores, homework and other things are part of a person's responsibility.
70	"Something Old, Something New"	Richard Trueblood	Carol Baxter	December 5, 1986	67070
Eli, an apprentice magician, accidentally finds the powerful Serenity Stone and discovers his magical powers are greatly multiplied. With the help of Madame Razz, She-Ra and Eli return the Stone to the centre of Etheria in order to restore the planet's balance before it is shaken to pieces. Loo-Kee tells the viewers to let their actions speak for themselves.
71	"Loo-Kee's Sweety"	Ernie Schmidt	Bob Forward	September 12, 1986	67071
When the Horde starts to imprison all of Loo-Kee's people on Beast Island, Loo-Kee must ask She-Ra for help organizing a rescue. Loo-Kee tells the viewers not to take stuff that isn't theirs.
72	"The Pearl"	Lou Kachivas	Bob Forward	25 October 1986	67072
She-Ra and Mermista take an injured baby whale to the undersea kingdom of Oceana. Upon her arrival, She-Ra learns she must recover the Pearl of Power, which gives the Mer-people their control over the waters and sea creatures, stolen by the Horde. Loo-Kee tells the viewers that if you get lost talk to a policeman.
73	"The Time Transformer"	Lou Kachivas	Don Heckman	1 November 1986	67073
When a Horde scientist invents a machine that can change the past, Hordak immediately sets out to change his old defeats into victories. She-Ra must stop him before the Rebellion is destroyed. Loo-Kee tells viewers to work hard, be honest and treat others kindly.
74	"Above It All"	Lou Kachivas	Barbara Hambly	8 November 1986	67074
When Shadow Weaver unleashes the storms from the Cave of Winds in an attempt to destroy Whispering Woods, She-Ra joins forces with the Skylanders and uses their huge airborne island to solve the problem. Loo-Kee tells the viewers that if you meet someone who is different they are beautiful too.
75	"Day of the Flowers"	Bill Reed	Durnford King	15 November 1986	67075
Orko accidentally conjures a spell that makes Adam and Adora's swords disappear while Hordak sends the huge Monstroid robots to abduct rebels to work in his mines. Loo-Kee tells the viewers to “believe in yourself”.
76	"Brigis"	Bill Reed	Coslough Johnson	22 November 1986	67076
Brigis, a magical village, appears in the present world only once every five hundred years. When Hordak decides to steal the village's magical energy by keeping it in the present, She-Ra must battle to return Brigis to the time stream. Loo-Kee tells the viewers that breaking the rules is bad for you.
77	"The Caregiver"	Bill Reed	J. Brynne Stephens	29 November 1986	67077
Shakra, Adora's childhood nurse, retires from the Horde to join the Rebellion unaware that Hordak and Shadow Weaver have placed a device in her necklace which will allow them to spy on the rebels. Loo-Kee tells the viewers to never judge a person by their behavior,
78	"When Whispering Woods Last Bloomed"	Ed Friedman	Frank Becker	6 December 1986	67078
Hordak kidnaps Netossa and tells her friend Spinnerella that she has been imprisoned by the Rebellion. Spinnerella joins the Horde forces, creating a huge whirlwind that threatens to break through the defenses of Whispering Woods. Loo-Kee tells the viewers to protect and enjoy plants.
79	"Romeo and Glimmer"	Tom Tataranowicz	Don Heckman	13 December 1986	67079
Glimmer is kind to Romeo, a member of the Horde, but he escapes with information that the Bright Moon force shield is not working. Loo-Kee tells viewers that friendship is sometimes hard for some people.
80	"The Perils of Peekablue"	Ernie Schmidt	Bob Forward	12 September 1987	67080
Hordak, needing a way to see into the Whispering Woods in order to capture rebels, kidnaps the all-seeing Peekablue and uses her to guide his mechanical Grabbers. Under Shadow Weaver's evil spell, Peekablue helps the Horde capture the rebels. Now, She-Ra must foil Hordak's plan and free Peekablue from the spell. Loo-Kee tells viewers to say no to drugs.
81	"Just the Way You Are"	Lou Kachivas	Carol Baxter	19 September 1987	67081
Drew, a young circus performer, runs away when he thinks his father doesn't love him. When the evil King Darkspur abducts Glimmer to make her his bride, Drew is also captured. Adam and Adora go to the rescue and Drew discovers that his father's affection for him is very real. Loo-Kee tells viewers that sometimes we forget how much our parents love us.
82	"The Locket"	Richard Trueblood	Michael Utvich	26 September 1987	67082
Imp steals a special locket given to Adora by Sea Hawk. Adora, accompanied by Sorrowful, the dragon, and a young girl named Dena, goes to the Fright Zone to recover it. When Hordak captures the girl, She-Ra, Sorrowful and Sea Hawk must go to the rescue. Loo-Kee tells the viewers to let your parents know where you're going so they won't worry.
83	"She-Ra Makes a Promise"	Tom Sito	Denis Higgins	3 October 1987	67083
When Sprocker is captured by Hordak, She-Ra takes his place in prison and vows not to attempt escape as long as Hordak refrains from attacking the rebels. But of course, Hordak has no intention of keeping his promise. Loo-Kee tells the viewers to ask your parents first before you leave them behind.
84	"Bow's Magical Gift"	Lou Kachivas	Philip Kassel	10 October 1987	67084
When Bow captures Shadow Weaver's magic wand, he gains powers beyond his wildest dreams. But he shows off too much with the wand and almost allows the village of Glenmar to be captured by the Horde. Loo-Kee tells the viewers that strength is best when used to help others.
85	"Sweet Bee's Home"	Tom Tataranowicz	Bob Forward	17 October 1987	67085
The bee-lady, Sweet Bee, crash lands on Etheria while on a scouting mission from the Hive, a huge colonizing spacecraft filled with her people. Hordak plans to trick the peaceful bee-people into landing on the planet so he can enslave them. Loo-Kee tells the viewers that moving to a new home is not bad you just may miss your old friends and make new ones.
86	"Glimmer Come Home"	Ernie Schmidt	Steven J. Fisher	24 October 1987	67086
Glimmer becomes jealous of Adora and plans her own attack on the Horde. Shadow Weaver disguises herself and several Horde Troopers so they may join up with Glimmer. When Glimmer attacks the Horde and Shadow Weaver reveals herself, She-Ra must come to Glimmer's rescue. Loo-Kee tells that viewers that everyone must work together on a team.
87	"The Inspector"	Bill Nunes	J. Larry Carroll	31 October 1987	67087
Prince Adam and Adora make Hordak's life miserable when they disguise themselves as Horde Inspectors, gain entrance to the Fright Zone and rescue a group of captured rebels as well as Adora's sword. Loo-Kee tells the viewers to turn to help when a job is tough.
88	"Portrait of Doom"	Bill Nunes	J. Larry Carroll	7 November 1987	67088
Catra captures a group of the rebels by tricking one of the Twiggets into using enchanted paints to create mysterious, Dorian Gray-like portraits of them and She-Ra is forced to lead a desperate rescue mission to the Fright Zone. Loo-Kee tells the viewers not to waste time wishing you were like someone else.
89	"Hordak's Power Play"	Bill Nunes	Brooks Wachtel, Tom Bagen	14 November 1987	67089
Hordak sends his robot ships to shoot down an Argon spaceship and steal its powerful energy cell. She-Ra joins forces with Larg, the pilot of the spaceship, to get the energy cell back from Hordak before it explodes and destroys all of Etheria. Loo-Kee tells the viewers that people want the same respect and understanding you have.
90	"Shades of Orko"	Bill Reed	J. Larry Carroll	21 November 1987	67090
When Shadow Weaver steals Orko's shadow, She-Ra, Man-At-Arms, and the rebels must invade Horror Hall itself to stop the Horde caster before she drains away all of Orko's magical powers. Loo-Kee tells viewers again that stealing is bad for you.: Adora is not in this episode. She is She-Ra for the whole episode.
91	"Assault on the Hive"	Richard Trueblood	Bob Forward	28 November 1987	67091
Skeletor invades the Hive, Sweet Bee's colonizing spaceship, in order to capture it and use it against Hordak. Sweet Bee escapes the invasion and goes to She-Ra for help. She-Ra also calls on He-Man for additional assistance. Together, they must stop Skeletor and free the Hive. Loo-Kee tells the viewers that if you want something, you have to work hard to get it.: Adora is not in this episode. She is She-Ra for the whole episode, This episode Also Marks the final appearances of Most of the He-Man Cast.
92	"The Bibbet Story"	Marsh Lamore	Don Heckman	5 December 1987	67092
Adora and Bow's journey through Bibbetland is abruptly halted when they discover a Horde robot factory and their weapons are stolen by two small Bibbets. They recover the weapons, but must persuade the peace-loving Bibbets to defend themselves against the Horde. Loo-Kee tells the viewers that running away from a fight is better than joining a fight.
93	"Swifty's Baby"	Ed Friedman	Story by : J. Larry Carroll, Arthur H. Nadel; Teleplay by : J. Larry Carroll	12 December 1987	67093
When Hordak kidnaps Swift Wind's expectant mate, She-Ra has to rescue her as quickly as possible. If the baby is born anywhere but on Unicorn Island, it will be just a normal horse and not a unicorn like its parents! Loo-Kee tells the viewers about the birth of a baby and for all good things are beautiful again.: Adora is not in this episode. She is She-Ra for the whole episode.
