= Drennon =

Drennon may refer to:

== People ==
- Eddie Drennon (born 1940), American musician
- Raleigh Drennon (1908–1965), American football player

== Other ==
- Drennon Creek, Henry County, Kentucky, US

== See also ==
- Drennan (disambiguation), Irish surname
