= Samuel Drennan =

Samuel Trangott Drennan (November 20, 1819 – 1882) was an Irish-born merchant and politician in Ontario, Canada. He served as mayor of Kingston in 1872.

He was born in the Moravian settlement, County Tyrone, and left Ireland as a boy, moving to Scotland with his father. Drennan was educated in Scotland. In 1841, he came to Kingston, where he worked as a clerk in a dry goods store. Drennan next worked as a purser on a steamship. He then, with a partner, opened his own dry goods store; after the partnership was dissolved, he continued operating on his own. Drennan married Annie Boyd. He then became a furniture manufacturer. For a time, his furniture was being built by convicts at the Kingston Penitentiary.

From 1873 to 1877 and from 1878 to 1879, he represented St. Lawrence ward on Kingston city council. Drennan turned the first sod on the Kingston and Pembroke Railway. He had also served in the hook and ladder company of the Kingston fire department.

His son William Melville Drennan also served as a mayor of Kingston.
