= Drinan =

Drinan or Drinnan may refer to:

== People with the surname ==
- Dan Drinan (born 1960), American sprint car driver
- Aaron Drinan (born 1998), Irish footballer
- Jimmy Drinnan (1906–1936), Scottish footballer
- Keith Drinan (1924–2004), Australian footballer
- Robert Drinan (1920–2007), Jesuit priest and U.S. Representative from Massachusetts

== Places ==
- Drinan, a townland near Swords, Ireland, part of Kinsealy–Drinan
- Drinan, Queensland, a locality in the Bundaberg Region, Queensland, Australia
- Drinnan, Alberta, Canada, a former village
- Drinnan Creek, Alberta, a tributary of the Gregg River

== See also ==
- Jeanie Drynan
