= William Melville Drennan =

William Melville Drennan (November 15, 1853 – May 28, 1900) was a merchant and politician in Ontario, Canada. He served as mayor of Kingston from 1890 to 1891.

The son of Samuel Trangott Drennan, a native of Ireland, he was born in Kingston. Canada West, and was educated at the Kingston College Institute. At the age of 15, he worked in the hardware business in Montreal and later worked as a travelling salesman in New York and Canada.

Drennan joined the Princess of Wales Own Rifles in 1863, serving as an Ensign during the Fenian Raids of 1870 for which he received the Canada General Service Medal. He then served as a Captain in the Kingston Field Battery.

In 1878, Drennan married May E. Moore. He then went into business on his own as a hardware merchant. He later entered the furniture business and, after that, became an undertaker. Drennan served as an alderman for Cataraqui ward and also served on the public school board.

He died in Kingston at the age of 46.
