= Peter Thomas Drennan =

UN official (born 1957)

- Born: 1957 (age 68–69)

Peter Thomas Drennan (born 1957) was the United Nations Under-Secretary-General for Safety and Security. Prior to this appointment of 28 June 2014 by United Nations Secretary-General Ban Ki-moon, Mr. Drennan served as the Deputy Commissioner for National Security with the Australian Federal Police.

Having commenced his police officer career in 1979, Mr. Drennan served in key leadership and management roles since 2002 within the Federal Police, notably as Assistant Commissioner on Counter Terrorism, Economic and Special Operations, Border and International Network as well as the Eastern Region. He has further experience as the Federal Police's Director of Operations Eastern Region and Regional Liaison Coordinator for East and South East Asia, based in Hong Kong. Mr. Drennan has represented Australia in national and international policing forums including INTERPOL and ASEANPOL leading international liaison relationships. He has undertaken postgraduate studies in human resource management and police executive leadership programs with the Australian Institute of Police Management as well as external programs with the Australian Graduate School of Management and Institute of Company Directors. He graduated in 2011 from the FBI National Executive Institute program. Born in 1957, Mr. Drennan is married and has two children.
