= Kathryn M. Drennan =

American writer

Kathryn M. Drennan is an American writer, having worked for Carl Sagan on the mini-series Cosmos: A Personal Voyage in the early 1980s and for Michael Piller, producer at the time for Star Trek: The Next Generation, in the early 1990s. She also contributed articles to several magazines, including Starlog and Twilight Zone Magazine. She was married to J. Michael Straczynski, creator of Babylon 5, and wrote articles about Rod Serling's Night Gallery for Twilight Zone Magazine together with him. She wrote one script during Babylon 5's first season, "By Any Means Necessary" as well as the prose Babylon 5 novel, To Dream in the City of Sorrows. She also wrote scripts for two other shows Straczynski worked on, She-Ra: Princess of Power and The Real Ghostbusters.

== Personal life ==
She met J. Michael Straczynski while they were both at San Diego State University. They moved to Los Angeles on April 1, 1981. They married in 1983, separated in 2002, and were divorced in 2003.

== Selected works ==
=== Novels ===
- Babylon 5 Book #9: To Dream in the City of Sorrows (covering the life of Jeffrey Sinclair from the end of season 1 until his final departure in season 3)

=== Articles and stories in magazines ===
- "The Mind Withdrawn", short story published in the Star Trek fanzine, Galactic Discourse #1, Feb 1977.
- "Rod Serling's Night Gallery" w/ J. Michael Straczynski, article in Twilight Zone Magazine, 3 issues, Mar - Aug 1985.
- "A Show by Show Guide to Rod Serling's Night Gallery" w/ J. Michael Straczynski, article in Twilight Zone Magazine, 11 issues, Mar 1985 - Jun 1989.
- "David Opatoshu and A Taste of Armageddon", article in Starlog, Jun 1987.
- "Bill Paxton: The Howling Commando", article in Starlog, Jan 1988.
- "Wil Wheaton: Acting Ensign", article in Starlog, Apr 1988.
- "Jonathan Frakes: One on One", article in Starlog, Jun 1988.
- "The Art of Night Gallery, article in Twilight Zone Magazine, Feb 1989.
- "DeForest Kelley's Medical Plan", article in Starlog, Jun 1989.
- "DeForest Kelley's Western Days", article in Starlog, Jul 1989.
- "A Test of Character", article in Starlog, Dec 1989.

=== Television credits ===
- She-Ra: Princess of Power (1985)
  - "The Unicorn King" (ep.36)
- Defenders of the Earth (1986)
  - "The Men of Frost" (ep.16)
- The Real Ghostbusters (1987)
  - "Night Game" (S2 ep.8)
  - "The Man Who Never Reached Home" (S2 ep.27)
  - "Egon’s Dragon" (S2 ep.63)
- Babylon 5 (1994)
  - "By Any Means Necessary" (ep.12)
