= Ron Thornton (visual effects designer) =

British visual effects pioneer (1957–2016)

- Born: 1957; London, UK
- Died: November 21, 2016; Albuquerque, New Mexico
- Occupation: Visual effects designer
- Years active: 1981-2016
- Known for: Pioneering television CGI visual effects
- Notable work: Babylon 5 Star Trek: Voyager Star Trek: Enterprise Blake's 7

Ron Thornton (1957–2016) was a pioneer in the field of computer-generated visual effects for film and television. He is best known for pioneering the use of Computer Generated Imagery (CGI) in the industry, through his work on the Babylon 5 series, which was the first television series to use CGI for all its visual effects. Thornton and his team won an Emmy award in 1993 for their work in the field. During his career, Thornton also worked with teams providing visual effects for many major science fiction productions, including Doctor Who, Blake's 7, Star Trek and Buffy the Vampire Slayer.

== Early career ==
Thornton was born in London in 1957, studying at West Kent College, and subsequently worked at Gatwick Airport as a flight dispatcher. After seeing the movie Alien, Thornton realised, "it dawned on me … that somebody could actually make money building plastic spaceships! That was quite amusing to me…"

Thornton built a few spaceship models, showing them to Mat Irvine at the BBC Special Effects Workshop. One of these was later used as the shuttle in Blake's 7. Irvine later offered Thornton work as his assistant, creating effects and electronic circuits. Among other things, Thornton created guns for the Doctor Who story "Warriors' Gate"

When Blake's 7 entered its fourth season, a new spaceship was needed. Thornton was assigned to build the model for the ship Scorpio, working from design plans in his living room to create versions in several different sizes, including partial models, each exact in scale and proportion. This led to Thornton being employed at the BBC in the Visual Effects Workshop, working with Bill Pearson and Martin Bower to create the Blake's 7 ships for that season. Thornton also worked on a number of Doctor Who stories featuring Peter Davison, and created part of the Tripod models for the BBC production, The Tripods.

== Career in the United States ==
In 1984, Thornton moved to the United States, where he worked on several different film and television projects, including Commando, Spaceballs and Robot Jox. Thornton and his friend Paul Beigle-Bryant, whom he had previously known in the UK, began a business as dealers in Psion handheld devices, under the name Foundation Systems.

Thornton ended up running the effects department for Captain Power and the Soldiers of the Future. Also involved in the series were producer Douglas Netter and writer J. Michael Straczynski, who would both would go on to produce Babylon 5. At that time, Thornton started experimenting on using 3D computer graphics for pre-visualising effects shots, and also purchased his first Commodore Amiga 2000 computer.

Thornton used an Amiga with a Video Toaster board to experiment with creating spaceship shots where not only the spaceship design, but also the motion and lighting could be controlled by the software. Suddenly effects shots which previously would have cost thousands of dollars could be done for much less. Together with Beigel-Bryant, Thornton started a visual effects company, Foundation Imaging, with the name partly giving continuity from their previous venture, Foundation Systems, as well as alluding to Isaac Asimov's Foundation novels.

== Foundation Imaging and Babylon 5 ==
Thornton was approached by Babylon 5 producer John Copeland, whom he knew from a previous project, to create something to promote the proposed series to Warner Brothers, as the producers had had little success with other networks. Although invited to submit a proposal for visual effects using physical models, Thornton began examining whether the Babylon 5 effects could be done by computer, discussing its technological and economic feasibility in detail with Beigle-Bryant. Thornton used LightWave 3D software on an Amiga to create a 300-frame, ten-second computer animation of a ship approaching the Babylon 5 space station, and transferred it onto a VHS tape. Meeting with Warner Brothers executives, Babylon 5 series creator J. Michael Straczynski did a pitch for the proposed series. The executives then asked the inevitable question about how were they going to afford to do the visual effects. Beigle-Bryant recalls, "[Straczynski] and Douglas Netter basically then turned to Ronny, who said something along the lines of 'like this', and played the ten second animation sequence sitting on a VHS tape." Warner Brothers approved the series soon afterwards.

When Foundation Imaging received the contract for Babylon 5, they hadn't told the producers that Foundation didn't actually have any viable way to physically deliver the rendered video output to the post-production studio: internet bandwidth was too limited at the time; and the Amigas were not capable of recording to Sony D-1 broadcast quality digital video tapes. Foundation commissioned developer Perry Kivolowitz to write software to enable the Amigas to write video data onto standard digital tape drives, which they then used to deliver their video output to post-production.

Thornton and the Foundation Imaging team won an Emmy Award for their work on the Babylon 5 pilot episode. Foundation's use of computer-generated imagery was less expensive than traditional physical models, and it also enabled the creation of effects which are difficult to create using models, such as having fighter craft spinning on different axes, having hundreds of ships moving in different directions, or dynamically changing the audience's viewpoint via the rotation and banking of the virtual camera. A magazine article on the making of Babylon 5 observed, "From the first moment the warp gate in Babylon 5 powered up and regurgitated a Vorlon armada, the viewing world knew that television had changed: …Overnight."

For the first season of the series, Foundation Imaging used 24 Commodore Amiga 2000 computers with LightWave 3D software and Video Toaster cards, 16 of which were dedicated to rending each individual frame of CGI at a resolution of 720 x 486 pixels, with each frame taking on average 45 minutes to render. FIRE (Foundation Imaging Render Environment), was a resource management software which was key to Foundation's level of output. FIRE handled job queuing, resource management and automatic error recovery. When an animator left his desk, he would click an icon, and FIRE would automatically take over the workstation, making it part of the rendering collective. For the second season, Foundation moved from using Amigas to using PCs, with Paul Beigle-Bryant assembling the computers from components. This was because the cost of buying a computer had to be amortised over a period of years, whereas purchasing components was 100 per cent tax deductible.

Thornton designed many of the ships seen in the series. It wasn't long before the Foundation team was regularly exceeding the content of the storyboards with complex space battle scenes. Series creator Straczynski gave up describing the space battles scene-by-scene, instead writing instructions such as "The Battle. A Ron Thornton special. Absolute carnage..." or "It is a scene from hell: explosion, heavy weapons fire, smoke, the ugly face of war on an alien world ... (Go crazy Foundation).”

Thornton also created the CGI-animated series Hypernauts, which aired in 1996, and directed one episode.

== Later career and Star Trek ==
After the third season of Babylon 5, producer Douglas Netter's startup company, Netter Digital Entertainment Inc, took over visual effects for the series, and Foundation was left without work. Thornton approached Dan Curry, the visual effects producer for the Star Trek: Voyager series, who engaged Thornton and Foundation to work on roughly every second episode of Voyager. Thornton's team created the spectacular crash landing scene in the one hundredth episode, "Timeless".

Thornton and Foundation were involved as a major visual effects studio for the animated series Roughnecks: Starship Troopers Chronicles, released in 1999–2000. In 2000, Thornton and Foundation took over effects work from Netter Digital for two animated series: Dan Dare: Pilot of the Future, produced for UK Channel Five., and Max Steel.

Thornton would also work on Star Trek: Deep Space Nine, Star Trek: Nemesis, the director's cut of Star Trek: The Motion Picture, and Star Trek: Enterprise.

By the time Foundation Imaging closed in 2002, it was running upwards of 500 computers in its rendering collective, those that were dedicated render machines – as opposed to workstations – without keyboards, monitors and cases.

Thornton worked as Visual Effects Supervisor on the series Buffy the Vampire Slayer, and was nominated for an Emmy Award for his work on the series in 2003.

Later in his career, Thornton worked on effects for the 2012 pilot of the ABC series, Nashville, and worked on the Austrian web series Talking Tom and Friends. Thornton also taught animation students at the Digital Animation & Visual Effects School (DAVE School) in Orlando, Florida.

Thornton died at the age of 59 on 21 November 2016 at home in Albuquerque, New Mexico.

== Legacy ==
Thornton has been described as a visionary and an "amazing creative force". His approach to his work was, "[D]on't tell us we can't do that, we'll find a way." Designer Luc Mayrand described his time working with Thornton on Babylon 5, "Ron and Foundation were fantastic..., and he, Paul, Mojo, and John Teska were way ahead of the curve in doing effects for tv. Ultimately, Ron's eye (and his team's) was incredible in determining the best final shape and color, plus the cinematography that went with the ships."

In addition to revolutionising the way that visual effects were achieved for television series, Thornton contributed to many significant science fiction series in both the UK and in North America. His work popularised the use of LightWave 3D software, which was to become regarded an industry standard. Thornton was a pioneer in the industry moving from expensive mainframe-based equipment to more affordable hardware and software. This enabled many self-taught and amateur artists to enter the field, with many being mentored by Thornton. Many significant visual effects artists were led or mentored by Thornton at Foundation, such as Adam "Mojo" Lebowitz, John Teska and Emile Smith, who would each go on to work as visual effects supervisors on prominent series, such as the 2004 Battlestar Galactica series.
