= Foundation Imaging =

CGI, 3D animation, and editing company

- Industry: CGI visual effects studio
- Defunct: December 28, 2002
- Fate: Bankruptcy
- Key people: Paul Beigle-Bryant and Ron Thornton (founders)

Foundation Imaging, Inc. was a CGI visual effects studio, computer animation studio, and post-production editing facility that existed from 1992 until 2002. The studio won Emmys for its work on Babylon 5 and Star Trek: Voyager.

== History ==
The company was founded by Paul Beigle-Bryant and Ron Thornton. It pioneered digital imaging for television programming using Newtek's LightWave 3D, originally on Commodore Amiga based Video Toaster workstations.

=== Dissolution ===
The company was dissolved after work on season one of Star Trek: Enterprise had been completed and the company assets were sold off in a public auction on December 17, 2002 by Brian Testo Associates, LLC.

=== Legacy ===
The company's pioneering work on Babylon 5 popularized using the software package Lightwave 3D on US TV shows for CGI visual effects, which led to it becoming an industry standard throughout the 1990s.

Key animators from the company and Emmy Award-winners Adam "Mojo" Lebowitz and John Teska remain major figures in the visual effects field for their work on shows such as the rebooted Battlestar Galactica and Lost.

== Notable works ==
=== Babylon 5 ===
Foundation Imaging is best known for their work on the science fiction series Babylon 5, winning an Emmy Award for the pilot episode.

=== Star Trek franchise ===
After completing the third season of Babylon 5, they worked on Paramount's Star Trek: Voyager and Star Trek: Deep Space Nine (ultimately winning two more Emmy Awards for their work on Voyager).

Foundation Imaging made the exterior views rendered by computer graphics for the Delta Flyer shuttlecraft, from drawings by Rick Sternbach, debuting on Voyager in the "Extreme Risk". They also did the CGI views of the Varro generation ship in the episode "The Disease" for example.

The company also worked on Robert Wise's director's cut of Star Trek: The Motion Picture. This was one of Foundation Imaging's last projects before they shut down. Lebowitz also worked with Paramount Plus on the film's 2022 restoration.

=== Batman CG visuals ===
While working on Star Trek, the company provided CG visuals for the Warner Brothers direct-to-video animated movies based on the Batman: The Animated Series TV series.

== Project history ==
=== Movies ===
- The Jackal (1997)
- Batman & Mr. Freeze: SubZero (1998)
- Today's Life (2000)
- The Legend of Zu (2001) (Blood Sea sequence)
- They Crawl (2001)
- Project Viper (2002)
- The Extreme Team (2003)

=== Live action series ===
- Babylon 5 (1993 – 1996) (seasons 1–3)
- Hypernauts (1995 – 1996) (season 1)
- Star Trek: Voyager (1996 – 2001) (seasons 3–7)
- Star Trek: Deep Space Nine (1997 – 1999) (the season 5 finale, seasons 6–7)
- Young Hercules (1998 – 1999)
- Dawson's Creek (2000) (single episode water effects)
- Star Trek: Enterprise (2001 – 2002) (season 1)

=== Animated series ===
- Roughnecks: Starship Troopers Chronicles (1999)
- Max Steel (2001)
- Dan Dare (2002)

=== Video games ===
- Twisted Metal: Black (2001) (CG movie and visual effects)

=== DVD ===
- Star Trek: The Motion Picture (DVD director's edition)

== Awards ==
- 1993 Emmy Award for Outstanding Individual Achievement In Special Visual Effects - Babylon 5: The Gathering: Paul Beigle-Bryant, Ron Thornton (each at Foundation Imaging) et al.
- 1999 Emmy Award for Outstanding Special Visual Effects for a Series - Star Trek: Voyager, episode "Dark Frontier": Rob Bonchune, Adam "Mojo" Lebowitz, John Teska (each at Foundation Imaging) et al.
- 2001 Emmy Award for Outstanding Special Visual Effects for a Series - Star Trek: Voyager, episode "Endgame": Robert Bonchune, John Teska (each at Foundation Imaging) et al.
