= Video Toaster =

Analog video hardware and software editing suite

- Developer: NewTek
- Manufacturer: NewTek
- Type: Video editing software and expansion card hardware
- Released: December 1990; 35 years ago
- Operating system: AmigaOS, Windows

The NewTek Video Toaster is a combination of hardware and software for the editing and production of NTSC standard-definition video. The plug-in expansion card initially worked with the Amiga 2000 computer and provides a number of BNC connectors on the exposed rear edge that provide connectivity to common analog video sources like VHS VCRs. The related software tools support video switching, luma keying, character generation, animation, and image manipulation.

For a few thousand U.S. dollars, the hardware and software provided a video editing suite in the early 1990s that rivaled the output of contemporary professional systems costing ten times as much. It allowed small studios to produce high-quality material and resulted in a cottage industry for video production not unlike the success of the Macintosh in the desktop publishing (DTP) market only a few years earlier. The Video Toaster won the Emmy Award for Technical Achievement in 1993. Other parts of the original software package were spun off as stand-alone products, notably LightWave 3D, and achieved success on their own.

As the Amiga platform lost market share and Commodore International went bankrupt in 1994 as a result of declining sales, the Video Toaster was moved to the Microsoft Windows platform where it is still available. The company also produced what is essentially a portable pre-packaged version of the Video Toaster along with all the computer hardware needed, as the TriCaster. These became all-digital units in 2014, ending production of the analog line.

== First generation systems ==
The Video Toaster was designed by NewTek founder Tim Jenison in Topeka, Kansas. Engineer Brad Carvey built the first wire wrap prototype, and Steve Kell wrote the software for the prototype. Many other people worked on the Toaster as it developed.

The Toaster was announced at the World of Commodore expo in 1987 and released as a commercial product in December 1990 for the Commodore Amiga 2000 computer system, taking advantage of the video-friendly aspects of that system's hardware to deliver the product at an unusually low cost of $2,399. The Amiga was well adapted to this application in that its system clock at 7.158 MHz was precisely double that of the NTSC color carrier frequency, 3.579 MHz, allowing for simple synchronization of the video signal. The hardware component is a full-sized card that is installed into the Amiga 2000's unique single video expansion slot rather than the standard bus slots, and therefore cannot be used with the A500 or A1000 models. The card has several BNC connectors in the rear, which accepts four video input sources and provided two outputs (preview and program). This initial generation system is essentially a real-time four-channel video switcher.

One feature of the Video Toaster is the inclusion of LightWave 3D, a 3D modeling, rendering, and animation program. This program became so popular in its own right that in 1994 it was made available as standalone product separate from the Toaster systems.

In addition to simple fades, dissolves, and cuts, the Video Toaster has a large variety of character generation, overlays, and complex animated switching effects. These effects are in large part performed with the help of the native Amiga graphics chipset, which is synchronized to the NTSC video signals. As a result, while the Toaster was rendering a switching animation, the computer desktop display is not visible. While these effects are unique and inventive, they cannot be modified. Soon Toaster effects were seen everywhere, advertising the device as the brand of switcher those particular production companies were using.

The Toaster hardware requires very stable input signals, and therefore is often used along with a separate video sync time-base corrector to stabilize the video sources. Third-party low-cost time-base correctors (TBCs) specifically designed to work with the Toaster quickly came to market, most of which were designed as standard ISA bus cards, taking advantage of the typically unused Bridgeboard slots. The cards do not use the Bridgeboard to communicate, but simply as a convenient power supply and physical location.

As with all video switchers that use a frame buffer to create DVEs (digital video effects), the video path through the Toaster hardware introduced delays in the signals when the signal was in "digital" mode. Depending on the video setup of the user, this delay could be quite noticeable when viewed along with the corresponding audio, so some users installed audio delay circuits to match the Toaster's video-delay lag, as is common practice in video-switching studios.

A user still needs at least three video tape recorders (VTR) and a controller to perform A/B roll linear video editing (LE), as the Toaster serves merely as a switcher, which can be triggered through general-purpose input/output (GPIO) to switch on cue in such a configuration, as the Toaster has no edit-controlling capabilities. The frame delays passing through the Toaster and other low-cost video switchers make precise editing frustrating. Internal cards and software from other manufacturers are available to control VTRs; the most common systems go through the serial port to provide single-frame control of a VTR as a capture device for LightWave animations. A Non-linear editing system (NLE) product was added later, with the invention of the Video Toaster Flyer.

Although initially offered as just an add-on to an Amiga, the Video Toaster was soon available as a complete turn-key system that included the Toaster, Amiga, and sync generator. These Toaster systems became very popular primarily because, at a cost of around US$5,000, they could do much of what a $100,000 professional video switcher (such as a Grass Valley switcher) could do at the time. The Toaster was also the first such video device designed around a general-purpose personal computer that was capable of delivering broadcast quality NTSC signals.

As such, during the early 1990s the Toaster was widely used by consumer Amiga owners, desktop video enthusiasts, and local television studios, and was even used during The Tonight Show regularly to produce special effects for comedy skits. It was often easy to detect a studio that used the Toaster by the unique and recognizable special switching effects. The NBC television network also used the Video Toaster with LightWave for its promotional campaigns, beginning with the 1990-1991 broadcast season ("NBC: The Place To Be!"). All of the external submarine shots in the TV series seaQuest DSV were created using LightWave 3D, as were the outer-space scenes in the TV series Babylon 5 (although Amiga hardware was only used for the first three seasons). Because of the heavy use of dark blues and greens (for which the NTSC television standard is weak), the external submarine shots in seaQuest DSV could not have made it to air without the use of the ASDG Abekas driver, written specifically to solve this problem by Aaron Avery at ASDG (later Elastic Reality, Inc.). This was due to "ASDG's exclusive color encoding technology which increases the apparent color bandwidth of video".

=== Video Toaster 4000 ===
An updated version called Video Toaster 4000 was later released, using the Amiga 4000's video slot. Many high-quality special effects were added and it could be used standalone (as an Amiga system) or from a Windows or Mac system connected to an Amiga with the Video Toaster card using dedicated software.

The 4000 was co-developed by actor Wil Wheaton, then famous for Star Trek: The Next Generation, who worked on product testing and quality control. He later used his public profile to serve as a technology evangelist for the product. Besides Wheaton, Penn Jillette (of Penn and Teller fame) and skateboarder Tony Hawk also served as evangelists for the 4000. Hawk was given a Video Toaster 4000 by NewTek upon learning that he was an Amiga user, in exchange for appearing in a promotional video for the product. Tony Hawk later used the Toaster for editing a promotional video for the TurboDuo game Lords of Thunder in 1993.

The Video Toaster 4000 won the 1993 best video hardware of the year award from Compute! magazine.

The Amiga Video Toaster 4000 source code was released in 2004 by NewTek & DiscreetFX.

== Video Toaster Flyer ==
For the second generation NewTek introduced the Video Toaster Flyer. The Flyer is a much more capable non-linear editing system. In addition to processing live video signals, the Flyer makes use of hard drives to store video clips as well as audio and allow complex scripted playback. The Flyer is capable of simultaneous dual-channel playback, which allows the Toaster's video switcher to perform transitions and other effects on video clips without the need for rendering.

The hardware component is again a card designed for the Amiga's Zorro II expansion slot, and was primarily designed by Charles Steinkuehler. The Flyer portion of the Video Toaster/Flyer combination is a complete computer of its own, having its own microprocessor and embedded software, which was written by Marty Flickinger. Its hardware includes three embedded SCSI controllers. Two of these SCSI buses are used to store video data and the third to store audio. The hard drives are thus connected to the Flyer directly and use a proprietary filesystem layout, rather than being connected to the Amiga's buses and were available as regular devices using the included MS-DOS driver. The Flyer uses a proprietary Wavelet compression algorithm known as VTASC, which was well-regarded at the time for offering better visual quality than comparable motion-JPEG-based nonlinear editing systems.

One of the card's primary uses is for playing back LightWave 3D animations created in the Toaster.

== Video Toaster Screamer ==
Front panel of the Video Toaster Screamer

In 1993, NewTek announced the Video Toaster Screamer, a parallel extension to the Toaster built by DeskStation Technology, with four motherboards, each with a MIPS R4400 CPU running at 150 MHz and 64 MB of RAM. The Screamer accelerated the rendering of animations developed using the Toaster's bundled Lightwave 3D software, and is supposedly 40 times as powerful as a Toaster 4000. Only a handful of test units were produced before NewTek abandoned the project and refocused on the Flyer. This cleared the way for DeskStation Technology to release their own cut-down version, the Raptor.

== Later generations ==
Later generations of the product run on Windows NT PCs. In 2004, the source code for the Amiga version was publicly released and hosted on DiscreetFX's site Open Video Toaster. With the additions of packages such as DiscreetFX's Millennium and thousands of wipes and backgrounds added over the years, one can still find the Video Toaster systems in use today in fully professional systems. NewTek renamed the VideoToaster to "VideoToaster[2]", and later, "VT[3]" for the PC version and is now at version 5.3. Since VT[4] version 4.6, SDI switching is supported through an add-on called SX-SDI.

NewTek released a spin-off product, known as the TriCaster, a portable live-production, live-projection, live-streaming, and NLE system. The TriCaster packaged the VT system as a turnkey solution in a custom-designed portable PC case with video, audio and remote computer inputs and outputs on the front and back of the case. As of April 2008, four versions were in production: the basic TriCaster 2.0, TriCaster PRO 2.0, TriCaster STUDIO 2.0 and the TriCaster BROADCAST, the latter of which added SDI and AES-EBU connectivity plus a preview output capability. The TriCaster PRO FX, a model that was situated in line between the original TriCaster PRO and TriCaster STUDIO was introduced in early 2008, and was discontinued. Its feature set was added to the TriCaster PRO 2.0. TriCaster STUDIO 2.0 and TriCaster BROADCAST which uses successively larger cases than the base model TriCaster 2.0. The units within the product line above the base-model TriCaster 2.0 enables use of LiveSet 3D Live Virtual Set technology developed by NewTek, which is also found in NewTek's venerable VT[5] Integrated Production Suite, the modern-day successor to the original Video Toaster.

In late 2009, NewTek released its high-definition version of the TriCaster, called the TriCaster XD300, a three-input HD system. It is able to accept a variety formats (NTSC, 720p, or 1080i; and on multi-standard systems, PAL) that can be mixed to downstream keys. The XD300 also features five M/E style virtual inputs, permitting up to three video sources in one source, accessible like any other input on the switcher.

At NAB Show 2010, NewTek announced its TCXD850, a rack-mountable eight-input switcher with 22 channels. It was released on July 15, 2010.

== Decline ==
By 2009, the Video Toaster started to receive less attention from NewTek in the run-up to the transition to HD systems. In December 2010, the discontinuation of VT[5] was announced, marking the end of the Video Toaster as a stand-alone product. TriCaster systems based on the VT platform were still made up until August 2012, when the TriCaster STUDIO was replaced by the TriCaster 40. This officially marked the end of the Video Toaster.

== Reception ==
In 1992, the Video Toaster was "fairly common ... especially at corporate video production facilities." It enabled "high-end" broadcast-level effects but in a "restricted budget". Cost for the toaster was around $4,600, vs. $100,000 or more for a high-end non-linear system. It was in use by 19% of surveyed "small-market" TV stations, and 50% of universities. (Note: "7 production directors at small market stations with news departments in Oklahoma, Texas, Arkansas, Missouri, Kansas, and New Mexico, as well as 56 instructors of television production classes at four year colleges in the same area. ... A "small-market" station was defined by Eastman as having a Nielsen market ranking of between 101 and 210") It was "rapidly becoming obsolete."

They were "considered by many" to not match the quality of higher-end systems. Don Lancaster said "by far the best low-end editing machine today [1996] remains the NeweTek [sic] Video Toaster."

== Subprograms ==
- ToasterCG is the character generation program inside Video Toaster.
- ToasterEdit is a video-editing subprogram inside of Video Toaster.
- ToasterPaint is a digital painting subprogram inside of Video Toaster.

== See also ==
- LightWave 3D
- Quantel Paintbox
