= Rec.arts.sf.tv.babylon5.moderated =

Usenet group dedicated to the works of J. Michael Straczynski

rec.arts.sf.tv.babylon5.moderated is a moderated Usenet newsgroup that focuses on the science fiction television series Babylon 5 and the works of writer J. Michael Straczynski. It was spun off from its un-moderated version, rec.arts.sf.tv.babylon5, in 1996. The newsgroup counts Straczynski as a frequent contributor, and was among the first internet-based forums where fans interacted directly with a 'showrunner'.

== History ==
In the early 1990s, several newsgroups were created that focused on the sci-fi show Babylon 5. One of these groups, rec.arts.sf.tv.babylon5, became well known for the participation of Babylon 5 creator and writer J. Michael Straczynski. Straczynski had long participated in many online forums since the 1980s, and is widely credited as being the first notable artist and celebrity to interact with fans online, even before the advent of the Internet as it is now known.

Straczynski interacted with Babylon 5 fans on rec.arts.sf.tv.babylon5 and similar groups on GEnie and CompuServe; however, rec.arts.sf.tv.babylon5 slowly turned into a morass of spam and 'flame wars' (usually perpetrated and carried forward by a rather small group of people). The more Babylon 5's ratings increased, and the more attention was drawn to Straczynski's involvement in the group, the more extensive and vitriolic the many flame wars got. By the end of 1995, Straczynski was also being 'net-stalked', and had to scrap a script in pre-production because fans were posting story ideas. Eventually, Straczynski left rec.arts.sf.tv.babylon5, focusing on the moderated Internet based forums.

A group of fans then proposed the creation of a moderated version of rec.arts.sf.tv.babylon5. The resultant Request For Discussion became the most replied to RFD in the history of Usenet at the time (surpassed only by the rec.music.white-power newsgroup vote), and the proposal overwhelmingly passed, creating rec.arts.sf.tv.babylon5.moderated. The majority of rec.arts.sf.tv.babylon5 contributors, as well as Straczynski and other Usenet personalities, flocked to the new group, essentially continuing rec.arts.sf.tv.babylon5 in a more controlled environment.

Straczynski continues to post to rec.arts.sf.tv.babylon5.moderated to this day, engaging in discussions with fans about many subjects in addition to answering questions about his works and using the group to make announcements about new projects. The various independent websites that archive his Usenet posts or the group itself are usually mis-cited in the media as being his official websites.

The group is actively moderated on a volunteer basis by two Babylon 5 fans, and the computer equipment and bandwidth costs are supported by donations from other fans. Posts can be made through normal Usenet methods (via a newsreader) or via e-mail.

== Moderation ==
Per the group's charter, no topic is "off topic". Most discussions at first naturally focused on Babylon 5, and since the show ended, on Straczynski's recent works in comics, film, radio and television. The group can be looked at as more of a general discussion group.

The only things that are not allowed in the group are spam, trolling, story ideas about Babylon 5 or other projects Straczynski may be working on, and flame wars.

Posts from new contributors or new threads go through the moderators for approval first ("hand moderation"). Posts to existing threads from experienced contributors are automatically allowed through by computer. Discussion threads on particularly heated subjects (usually politics) are continuously hand moderated to prevent flame wars from occurring, and if they do, the thread can be shut down. The system is not perfect: posts can be lost and the group can be down to new posts if the moderation computers are being moved or during power outages, etc. Appearance of new threads are dependent on the availability of the moderators, and may sometimes take more than a day to appear. Occasionally, complaints of censorship arise, though these complaints are often from people who were making posts that violated the clearly set rules. Nevertheless, the forum is still a popular discussion ground for Straczynski's fans, with the main selling point being the opportunity to interact with Straczynski.

Jay Denebeim, a volunteer moderator for Rec.arts.sf.tv.babylon5.moderated, was profiled in a Wall Street Journal article that covered the travails that beset the Usenet in the late 1990s.

== Legacy ==
Straczynski's involvement with rec.arts.sf.tv.babylon5 and its successor, rec.arts.sf.tv.babylon5.moderated, has had great influence on his works, especially Babylon 5. Straczynski's involvement on these groups also paved the way for similar online discussion involvement by many artists and celebrities today.

At the time, the word "blog" had not yet been coined, and yet Straczynski's discussion of every episode of the show prior to its airing remains a critical milestone in the history of production-related blogging.

== Straczynski's contributions ==
Straczynski began his postings on GEnie with background information about the setting and history of the major races and station. By the time he began posting to Usenet, the pilot was over and episodes were in production. Discussion of upcoming projects was a frequent topic throughout, and began as early as July 1993 with information about upcoming comic book adaptations.

Early in the first season, Straczynski began to divulge details of upcoming plot threads, though he did so sparingly. One such comment set up the homosexual themes that would not be revealed until the second season between two of the female characters ("Divided Loyalties"). This particular plot thread eventually led to one of the most discussed editing choices in the show's history. A kiss between the two women during the second season was edited in such a way that it was strongly suggestive, but not a definitive kiss.

Religion played a large role in Babylon 5, and yet in many of his postings, Straczynski discussed his atheism. During the first season, he commented that

religion [...] has always been present. And it will be present 200 years from now. That may not thrill me, but when one is a writer, one must deal with realities, and that's one of them. To totally ignore that part of the human equation would be as false and wrong-headed as ignoring the fact that people get mad, or passionate, or strive for better lives. [...] In the Babylon 5 universe, all the things that make us human—our obsessions, our interests, our language, our culture, our flaws and our wonderfulnesses—are all still intact.

In addition to his discussion of the show itself, Straczynski often fielded questions related to the writing process in general or regarding the business side of Babylon 5. Many posters asked about topics such as the demands of writing for a series, and how to break into the industry.

As the seasons progressed, ratings were a frequent topic because of the concern surrounding seasonal renewal of the show. For similar reasons, awards such as Emmys that the show received were also discussed on a regular basis.

Departures from the show were often highly emotional topics for the fans, and for Straczynski. The three primary departures which sparked the most commentary were those of Michael O'Hare (between seasons 1 and 2), Andrea Thompson (mid-season 2) and Claudia Christian (between seasons 4 and 5). These departures were also a great source of speculation which ignited strong responses from Straczynski. Straczynski shared information regarding the death of Richard Biggs and Andreas Katsulas.

Details of production and business choices to which fans are not always privy were often shared. Some examples include:

- The pre-filming of the last episode of the series during season 4, in case of cancellation.
- The cancellation of Crusade and the notes process with TNT that led up to it.
- Negotiations to make a Babylon 5 film (these were suspended after Richard Biggs' death).
- The start of production of the Babylon 5: The Lost Tales direct to DVD.
- Announcement that he would adapt E. E. "Doc" Smith's Lensman series for Ron Howard.
- Announcement that the only continuation of the Babylon 5 series will be as a feature film.

== See also ==
- Babylon 5's use of the Internet
- The Lurker's Guide to Babylon 5
