= The Lurker's Guide to Babylon 5 =

Fan-run website dedicated to Babylon 5

The Lurker's Guide to Babylon 5 is a fan-run website that includes detailed episode guides and analyses, production history notes, background materials, references and other information related to the science fiction epic, Babylon 5. The name is derived from the term lurker, which creator J. Michael Straczynski adopted to refer to the underclass residents on the Babylon 5 station.

== Structure ==
The Lurker's Guide has five major sections, starting with "The Babylon 5 Universe". This section introduces the show and gives background on historical events in the series' timeline that shaped its political and social climate. There are also sections for resources and references and detailed information on the production of the show.

The heart of The Guide lies in the individual episode listings. Each episode and telefilm has a synopsis page, a background page (providing a description and explanation of the story arc up to that episode) and detailed cast and crew credits. The main guide page contains a "backplot" section, which shows how the episode relates to the overall story arc, a section for unanswered questions from the episode, a detailed analysis section, plus a section on miscellaneous notes. Each article concludes with a "JMS Speaks" section, which contains Straczynski's comments about the episode, gathered from various online forums on which he posted.

== History ==
The Guide was created by Steven Grimm around early 1993, long before the pilot aired, as a FAQ posted on Usenet. A website was set up, but when the FAQ became too cumbersome, The Guide was born. Grimm maintained the site, with contributions from several fans over the years.

During the run of Babylon 5, The Lurker's Guide was updated, adding new facts and insights whenever they became available. Although the site is not updated as frequently since the series' end, it still serves as a record and reference of the fan experience surrounding Babylon 5. Straczynski commented that even he used the site for quick reference, calling it an "invaluable resource".

== Legacy ==
The Guide and its associated FTP archive used to be located at hyperion.com before Grimm lost the domain. In the first-season episode "A Voice in the Wilderness", Straczynski named the EAS Hyperion cruiser after the site.

In an early piece on the World Wide Web, The Washington Post noted The Lurker's Guide as a "Star Trek" (sic) resource accessible through www.infi.net/cool.html. In 1997, when TV Guide ran a cover story on Babylon 5, The Guide was one of the websites featured in a special sidebar.

On the Babylon 5 Season 5 DVD, Straczynski also acknowledged The Lurker's Guide and Grimm for his years of help and support, illustrating The Guide's significant central role in the development of Babylon 5 fandom and the series itself. In 1998 The Booklist wrote that The Lurker's Guide "deserves special attention as an example of an outstanding site devoted to an extraordinary show."

== See also ==
- Babylon 5's use of the Internet
- rec.arts.sf.tv.babylon5.moderated
