= Fabiana Udenio =

Argentine-Italian actor (born 1964)

- Born: 21 December 1964 (age 61); Buenos Aires, Argentina
- Years active: 1978–present
- Spouses: Judson Scott (m. 1986; div. 1995) Robert MacLeod (m. 2004; div. 2009)
- Children: 1

Fabiana Udenio (born December 21, 1964) is an Italian-Argentine actress. Born in Argentina to Italian parents, she grew up in Rome. She is best known for her role as Alotta Fagina in Austin Powers: International Man of Mystery and for playing the ex-wife of Arnold Schwarzenegger's character in the Netflix action comedy series FUBAR.

== Early life ==
Fabiana Udenio was born in Buenos Aires, Argentina. She moved to Italy, where she was crowned "Miss Teen Italy" at the age of 13. That same year, Udenio made her theatre debut as Miranda in a production of The Tempest directed by Giorgio Strehler. She also began acting in films and television as a teenager.

== Career ==
Udenio's film roles include playing the daughter of a World War II Resistance fighter in The Scarlet and the Black, Italian foreign-exchange student Anna-Maria Mazarelli in Summer School (1987), the sunbather in the "Sunblock 5000" commercial within RoboCop 2 (1990), Dan Cain's only living girlfriend Francesca in Bride of Re-Animator (1990), as "Alotta Fagina" in Austin Powers: International Man of Mystery (1997), as "Don Na" in The Godson (1998), and Gabriella in Pauly Shore's film In The Army Now (1994).

On television, Udenio had the recurring role of "Giulietta" on the ABC soap opera One Life to Live (1985-1986), and was a regular cast member in the Peter Benchley syndicated drama Amazon (1999–2000). She has guest starred and had recurring roles on dozens of television shows, including Babylon 5, Baywatch, Full House, NYPD Blue, Quantum Leap, Mortal Kombat: Conquest, Cheers, Mad About You, Wings, Designing Women, The Magnificent Seven, CSI: Miami, and Mistresses. She also had the recurring role as Atooza Shirazion in 90210 (2008–2011).

She appeared in the recurring role of Elena Di Nola/Mutter in the series Jane the Virgin (2015–2016).

Starting in 2023, she has appeared as a series regular, playing the ex-wife of Arnold Schwarzenegger's character, in the Netflix series for 2 seasons FUBAR.

== Personal life ==
In 1986, Udenio married the actor Judson Scott, whom she met in New York on the set of the soap opera One Life to Live. Udenio and Scott divorced in 1995, and in 2004 Udenio married Robert F. MacLeod, a real estate developer. The marriage ended in 2009 when Udenio filed for divorce, citing irreconcilable differences. Udenio and MacLeod have a son named Adrian Raice MacLeod.

== Selected filmography ==
- 1978 Passion Flower Hotel as Gina
- 1980 The Warning
- 1983 The Scarlet and the Black as Guila Lombardo
- 1986 Hardbodies 2 as Cleo / Princess
- 1987 Summer School as Anna-Maria Mazarelli
- 1987 Full House as Adrianna (episode "Daddy's Home")
- 1989 Cheers as Maid (episode "The Visiting Lecher")
- 1989 Bride of Re-Animator as Francesca Danelli
- 1989 The Hogan Family as Chiara (episode "Coming To America")
- 1990 Quantum Leap as Eva Panzini (episode "Leaping in Without a Net")
- 1990 RoboCop 2 as Sunblock Woman
- 1991 Diplomatic Immunity as Teresa Escobal
- 1992 Anni 90 as Daniela (segment "Un amore impossibile")
- 1993 Journey to the Center of the Earth as Sandra Miller
- 1993 Baywatch as Lena Fiori (episode "Stakeout at Surfrider Beach")
- 1993 Walker, Texas Ranger Cobra (episode “Deadly Ground”)
- 1994 Renegade (TV series) as Camilla (episode "Way Down Yonder in New Orleans")
- 1994, 1998 Babylon 5 as Adira Tyree (episodes "Born to the Purple", "Day of the Dead")
- 1994 In the Army Now as Gabriella
- 1995 Wings as Teresa (episode "Et Tu, Antonio?")
- 1997 Austin Powers: International Man of Mystery as Alotta Fagina
- 1998 The Godson as Don Na
- 1999–2000 Amazon as Pia Claire (main cast)
- 2001 The Wedding Planner as Anna Bosco
- 2004 Slammed as Natasha
- 2008–2011 90210 as Atooza Shirazi (7 episodes)
- 2015–2016 Jane the Virgin Elena Di Nola (7 episodes)
- 2023–2025 FUBAR as Tally Brunner (main cast)
