= Soul Hunter =

Soul Hunter may refer to:

- Soul Hunter (anime) (Hoshin Engi in Japan), a 1999 anime series loosely based on Fengshen Yanyi
- Soul Hunter (Babylon 5), a 1994 episode of the science-fiction series Babylon 5, as well as the name of an alien order featured in the episode
- Soul Hunters, a 1987 spy novel by George Markstein
