= Myriam Sirois =

Canadian actress (born 1975)

- Born: February 2, 1975 (age 51); Sept-Îles, Quebec, Canada
- Occupation: Actress
- Years active: 1986–2008

Myriam Sirois (born February 2, 1975) is a Canadian former actress, mainly known for being the voice of Akane Tendo in the English version of Ranma ½. She also portrayed Sarah Cantrell in the Babylon 5 movie The Legend of the Rangers: To Live and Die in Starlight. She also played the voice of Zoey in Rudolph the Red-Nosed Reindeer: The Movie and the voice of Sulia Gaudeamus in Fatal Fury: The Motion Picture.

She had since transitioned into other ventures according to her LinkedIn Page.

== Filmography ==
=== Film ===
Year	Title	Role	Notes
1994	Ranma ½: The Movie, Big Trouble in Nekonron, China	Akane Tendo	
1994	Ranma ½: The Movie 2, Nihao My Concubine	Akane Tendo	
1994	Fatal Fury: The Motion Picture	Sulia Gaudeamus	
1998	Rudolph the Red-Nosed Reindeer: The Movie	Zoey, Glitter, Schoolroom Doe	

=== Television ===
Year	Title	Role	Notes
1991	A Mother's Justice	Tammy	Television film
1991	Neon Rider	Ranch Kid	Episode: "Men of Principle"
1991	Funky Fables	Snow White, Cinderella, Klara	Voice
1992	Miles from Nowhere	Katherine	Television film
1992	Bitsy Bears	Ritabear	
1993–2003	Ranma ½	Akane Tendo	142 episodes
1993–1995	Ranma ½ OVA	Akane Tendo	10 episodes
1995	Johnny's Girl	Nancy	Television film
1996	The Limbic Region	Teen Girl	Television film
1996	Please Save My Earth	Sakura Kokusho, Shusuran	Voice
1997	Daughters	Stacey	Television film
1997–2000	Dragon Ball Z	Scratch / Nurse	5 episodes
1999	Night Man	Nurse	Episode: "Blader"
2002	Babylon 5: The Legend of the Rangers	Sarah Cantrell	Television film
2002	Tracker	Bridget	Episode: "What Lies Beneath"
2003	Comfort and Joy	Jessica	Television film
2003–2004	Doc	Dr. Sara Mitchell	3 episodes
2004	Wild Card	Jane Banks	Episode: "Block Party"
2006	Four Extraordinary Women	Restaurant date	Television film
2008	Supernatural	Maya Sanders	Episode: "Dream a Little Dream of Me"
