= Born to the Purple =

- Babylon 5 episode
- Episode no.: Season 1 Episode 3
- Directed by: Bruce Seth Green
- Written by: Larry DiTillio
- Production code: 104
- Original air date: February 9, 1994

Guest appearances
- Fabiana Udenio as Adira Tyree; Clive Revill as Trakis

Episode chronology
← Previous "Soul Hunter"	Next → "Infection"

"Born to the Purple" is the third episode of the first season of the science fiction television series, Babylon 5. The episode deals with Centauri ambassador, Londo Mollari, having important files on him stolen by his lover, Adira Tyree.

== Title ==
The title has a double meaning, referring to a person who has been born to rule, and also to the Centauri Purple Files, files held on prominent Centauri figures for the purpose of blackmail and extortion.

== Plot ==
Commander Jeffrey Sinclair is trying to negotiate a treaty between the Narn and Centauri governments over a disputed sector of space, with help of telepath Talia Winters. While Narn ambassador G'Kar cooperates freely, they have trouble drawing Centauri ambassador Mollari from his love interest, an exotic dancer named Adira Tyree. Unknown to them, Adira is a slave owned by Trakis who wants Adira to acquire Mollari's "purple files": files that contain high-level information about the Centauri government. Adira is conflicted between her love for Mollari, and Trakis' threats. She tricks Mollari into drinking a sleeping agent that allows her time to learn his passwords and access the files. However, when she is scheduled to trade them to Trakis, she flees.

Trakis approaches Mollari, convincing him that Adira was working against him, and showing him the papers which give Trakis ownership of Adira as his slave. Feeling scorned, Mollari continues to put off the negotiations in order to look for Adira. He asks Commander Sinclair to support his search for Adira; Sinclair agrees on the condition that Mollari accepts his proposal for a treaty with the Narn. Meanwhile, Trakis hires criminals to track down Adira. These men attack Sinclair and Mollari but soon are called off, as Adira has been found by Trakis. Sinclair, with G'Kar and Talia's help, tricks Trakis into revealing where he has kept Adira on the station. With Sinclair's help, Mollari gets Adira's ownership papers from Trakis and gives them to her, freeing her. He attempts to convince her to stay aboard Babylon 5 since the threat has passed, but she wants to return to a Centauri world.

Meanwhile, Garibaldi discovers that someone is using the high-priority secure gold channel to make external communications from the station, something that should only be authorized by Sinclair. He approaches Ivanova about it, and she suggests it might be the work of "gremlins". After several failed attempts, each of which has Ivanova suggesting Garibaldi look elsewhere, he manages to catch the channel being used again and finds that it is Ivanova herself speaking with her terminally ill father. It is his last call to her, apologizing for being a bad father to her and making up to her before he dies. Garibaldi reports to Ivanova that he found the source of the gold channel communication, stating that it was just a computer glitch while also implying that he knows the truth; knowing of her loss, he offers to buy her a drink later.

== Writing ==
The episode was written by screenwriter Larry DiTillio, who also contributed to the series Murder, She Wrote along with Straczynski. The original title of the episode was "Amaranth", being later changed to "Born to the Purple". The premise given to DiTillio originally did not include the Purple Files, and instead dealt with the mind-altering drug Dust, which appears in Season 3. DiTillio wanted the story to go to a higher level and conceived the idea of the Purple Files. DiTillio stated, "It was nice to show Londo as the romantic, which he really is, and to show that his flaw is that he's always been searching for love, which, of course, comes to tragic consequences in Season Three."

== Production ==
The Babylon 5 makeup department involved in this episode – consisting of Everett Burrell, Greg Funk, Mary Kay Morse, Ron Pipes and John Vulich – won the 1994 Emmy Award for Outstanding Individual Achievement in Makeup for a Series for episode 5 of the season, 'The Parliament of Dreams'

Adira was played by Argentine-Italian actress Fabiana Udenio. According to showrunner J. Michael Straczynski, Udenio wore a prosthetic head piece to simulate the largely-bald hairstyle of Centauri women. Straczynski comments, "[T]he one time we did have a bald woman as a background extra, those not in the know on stage kept commenting on how fake the bald-cap looked."

Trakis was played by New Zealand stage actor Clive Revill, known for his work in musical theatre, and with the Royal Shakespeare Company. Revill also voiced Emperor Palpatine in the original 1980 version of The Empire Strikes Back.

Claudia Christian, in reference to playing an emotional scene where her father dies, said, "I think it shows a lot of quiet resolve and strength. It also is an indication of how bloody important her job is. I mean, yes she's hiding her feelings by immersing herself in work, but on the other hand she's a pro. 'I've lost everyone in my family, and I still go to work.'" Jerry Doyle, who played Garibalidi, commented, "She did a really nice job in showing the vulnerability of her character and the dignity of her position ... It was a nice character moment for both of us."

For its visual effects scenes, Babylon 5 pioneered the use of computer-generated imagery (CGI) scenes – instead of using more expensive physical models – in a television series. The visual effects were created by Foundation Imaging using 24 Commodore Amiga 2000 computers with Lightwave 3D software and Video Toaster cards, 16 of which were dedicated to rending each individual frame of CGI, with each frame taking on average 45 minutes to render. In-house resource management software managed the workload of the Amiga computers to ensure that no machine was left idle during the image rendering process.

The Centauri transport ship shown in the episode was created by Foundation Imaging visual effects supervisor Adam "Mojo" Lebowitz, inspired by the design of the Rebel transport ships from The Empire Strikes Back. Lebowitz recalls, "I only designed (and built) one ship, the Centauri transport that looks a bit like a Volkswagen. I just felt like building a model, I rarely did it and didn't think it was a strength, so it was important to me to give it a go and try to grow as an artist."

According to A Dream Given Form: The Unofficial Guide to the Universe of Babylon 5, the prop for bouquet containing the rare star lace flowers which Londo gives to Adira, actually contained small white Christmas lights rather than flowers.

Music for the title sequence and the episode was provided by the series' composer, Christopher Franke. Franke developed themes for each of the main characters, the station, for space in general, and for the alien races, endeavoring to carry a sense of the character of each race.

The episode was mixed on 4 October 1993, and aired on 9 February 1994.

== Commentary and reviews ==
Ensley Guffey and Dale Koontz comment on Peter Jurasik's performance as Londo Mollari: "The result is a multidimensional portrait of a man as complex as he is contradictory, painted with exquisite care and surprising subtlety by Jurasik. Loud, proud, tender, brash, baleful, humorous, and heartbreaking, in this episode Londo Mollari truly comes to life in all his bittersweet glory." They also praise Claudia Christian's performance as Lieutenant Commander Ivanova: "Claudia Christian brings a perfect mix of stoicism, Russian fatalism, and ironic humor to her character, all simmering atop a deep well of anger and grief, which is beautifully revealed in her final conversation with her estranged father. Ivanova's own mask of command is laid briefly aside in this episode, revealing the human woman beneath." They point out that Ivanova here shows an important aspect of her character which is shown throughout the series: that she is willing to break the rules in order to do the right thing.

Rowan Kaiser, writing in The A.V. Club, notes that while the episode is not outstanding, it plays an important role is setting up the character of Centauri Ambassador Londo Mollari. Kaiser writes, "Its events are directly referenced later, and they're important to a major character's dramatic arc, but the episode itself is pretty middling."

Elias Rosner, writing in Multiversity Comics, observes, "For all the strengths displayed these last couple episodes, they've all been standalones and continuity-wise, don't really reference each other ... The individual, episodic plot threads are less about moving the narrative along and more about moving the characters, redefining them, or giving insight into who they are." Rosner notes the unusual beginning to Ivanova's character arc: "It's also interesting that this is the place the writers chose to start ... Not with the knowledge that she's been fighting with her father nor with the knowledge that her father is sick, instead, it's at his death and with their reconciliation. This is usually the end of an arc but here, it's used as the springboard for her own development and it gives us two of this episode's best scenes."
