= Wayne Alexander (actor) =

American actor

Wayne Alexander (born 1943) is an American actor who grew up in the San Joaquin Valley in California.

== Career ==
=== Theatre ===
He trained at the Los Angeles City College Theater Academy, then spent four years at San Francisco's American Conservatory Theater. He later worked as a fight choreographer and did stage work both in Los Angeles and New York City. In the late 1980s, he made the switch to film and TV.

=== Babylon 5 ===
Alexander appeared in numerous roles on the Babylon 5 television series. His first appearance in the series was in the season two episode "Comes the Inquisitor" as "Sebastian" – the only time he played a human. Alexander subsequently played "Lorien". Other appearances were in season three as a Narn named "G'Dan" in the episode "And the Rock Cried Out, No Hiding Place", as a Drazi in the season four episode "Intersections in Real Time", and as a Drakh in the season five episodes "Movements of Fire and Shadow" and "The Fall of Centauri Prime". In the television films, he played a Drakh in Babylon 5: A Call to Arms, and in Babylon 5: The River of Souls, he appeared as a soul.

=== Other appearances ===
On television Alexander has also guest starred on Otherworld (1985), The Twilight Zone (1986), Hypernauts (1996), Frasier (1997), Sabrina, the Teenage Witch (1998), Becker (1998), The X-Files (1998-2000), Mad Men (2013), and Scandal (2013).

In the 1990 film Spaced Invaders, Alexander portrayed Vern Pillsbury, the geekish gas station attendant who becomes the powerful "Verndroid" after coming into contact with the commander of the invading Martians.

== Filmography ==
Year	Title	Role	Notes
1985	Otherworld	Lieutenant/Aid	5 episodes
1986	The Twilight Zone	Cornelius	Episode: Devil's Alphabet
1986	The Disney Sunday Movie	Father	Episode: Little Spies
1990	Spaced Invaders	Vern Pillsbury	
1995-1998	Babylon 5	Lorien/Sebastian/Drakh/Drazi	
1996	Mr. Wrong	Man at Opera	
1996	Hypernauts	Barada	Episode: Into the Dark So Deep
1997	Frasier	Peter Soutendeck	Episode: To Kill a Talking Bird
1998	Sabrina, the Teenage Witch	Claude	Episode: When Teens Collide
1998	Becker	Wholesome Man	Episode: City Lights
1998-2000	The X-Files	Various Roles	3 episodes
1999	Babylon 5: The River of Souls	Drakh	TV movie
2013	Mad Men	George Parsons	Episode: A Tale of Two Cities
2013	Scandal	TV Reporter	Episode: Say Hello to My Little Friend
