= Amazon (1999 TV series) =

- Also known as: Amazonas – Gefangene des Dschungels
- Created by: Peter Benchley
- Developed by: Malcolm MacRury
- Written by: Alison Lea Bingeman; Paul Aitken
- Directed by: Milan Cheylov; T.W. Peacocke
- Starring: C. Thomas Howell; Carol Alt; Chris William Martin; Fabiana Udenio; Tyler Hynes; Rob Stewart
- Composer: Guy Zerafa
- Countries of origin: Canada; Germany
- Original languages: English; German
- No. of seasons: 1
- No. of episodes: 22

Production
- Executive producers: Seaton McLean; Peter Sussman; Peter Benchley
- Producer: Jan Peter Meyboom
- Running time: 44 minutes
- Production companies: Alliance Atlantis; WIC Entertainment; Beta Film GmbH; Eyemark Entertainment (1999-2000) (season 1); King World (2000) (season 1)

Original release
- Network: Syndication
- Release: 26 September 1999 – 20 May 2000

Amazon (also known as Peter Benchley's Amazon) was a syndicated adventure drama series created by Peter Benchley. It was developed by Canadian production companies Alliance Atlantis Communications & WIC Entertainment and German company Beta Film GmbH. The 22 episodes of the series were in first-run syndication between 1999 and 2000.

A novelization of the 2-hour pilot was written by Rob MacGregor, and a mass-market paperback was released by Harper (publisher) on 8 Aug 2000.

== Premise ==
The drama series focused on the six survivors of a crashed airline flight in the Brazilian Amazon jungle. The group soon comes into contact with a hostile indigenous tribe, the Fierce Ones. They are taken in by a mysterious tribe called the Chosen, who are descended from 16th-century British colonists who were lost in the rainforest. Relations with the Chosen are tenuous at best. Most of the group escapes the Chosen only to stir up a hornets' nest with the cannibalistic Jaguar People, led by an insane Canadian woman bent on domination of all the local tribes.

== Cast ==
- C. Thomas Howell as Dr. Alex Kennedy
- Carol Alt as Karen Oldham
- Fabiana Udenio as Pia Claire
- Chris Martin as Jimmy Stack
- Rob Stewart as Andrew Talbott
- Tyler Hynes as Will Bauer

== Episodes ==
No.	Title	Directed by	Written by	Original release date
1	"Fallen Angels"	Jon Cassar	Peter Benchley	September 26, 1999
2	"Nightfall"	Jon Cassar	Story by : Malcolm MacRury & Paul Aitken; Teleplay by : Malcolm MacRury	October 2, 1999
3	"Suffer the Little Children"	Ron Oliver	Malcolm MacRury	October 9, 1999
4	"Exodus"	Ron Oliver	Paul Aitken	October 16, 1999
5	"The Chosen"	Jon Cassar	Heather Conkie	October 23, 1999
6	"The End of the World"	Jon Cassar	Heather Conkie & Malcolm MacRury	October 30, 1999
7	"The Lost Words"	Terry Ingram	Paul Aitken	November 6, 1999
8	"Resurrection"	Holly Dale	Heather Conkie	November 13, 1999
9	"The Blood Angel"	Terry Ingram	Malcolm MacRury	November 20, 1999
10	"War"	Milan Cheylov	Paul Aitken	November 27, 1999
11	"Eyes in the Dark"	John Bell	Heather Conkie	January 22, 2000
12	"The First Stone"	Luc Chalifour	Alison Lea Bingeman	January 29, 2000
13	"The Devil's Army"	John Bell	Rick Drew	February 5, 2000
14	"The Finding"	Scott Summersgill	Heather Conkie	February 12, 2000
15	"Escape"	Clay Borris	Paul Aitken	February 19, 2000
16	"Home"	T.W. Peacocke	Malcolm MacRury	February 26, 2000
17	"The Pale Horseman"	Gordon Langevin	Heather Conkie	April 15, 2000
18	"The White Witch"	Craig Pryce	Paul Aitken	April 22, 2000
19	"Circle of Fire"	T.W. Peacocke	Heather Conkie	April 29, 2000
20	"Babel"	Ross Clyde	Malcolm MacRury	May 6, 2000
21	"Wild Child"	David Stratton	Paul Aitken	May 13, 2000
22	"A Bible and a Gun"	Ross Clyde	Malcolm MacRury	May 20, 2000

== Production ==
I’ve always been interested in what would happen with the culture clash of modern folks running into people who live outside of civilization. We thought this series would be a good way to explore the issue of the intrusion of modern society into the (rain forest) environment

— Peter Benchley on the idea behind Amazon

In April 1998, Peter Benchley inked a deal with Atlantis Films to develop the show. Benchley came up with the idea for “Amazon” while vacationing in the Caribbean when he stumbled across centuries-old buttons and other artifacts buried in the sand.

Each episode of the series cost $1.2 million. The total cost of the series was $26 million, making it one of the most expensive television series ever made.

The show started airing on WIC Television in October 1999.

== Home media ==
Alliance Home Entertainment released the complete series on DVD in Canada only on 22 February 2011. This was soon followed by the release to the rest of the North American market.
