= The Coming of Shadows =

- Babylon 5 episode
- Episode no.: Season 2 Episode 9
- Directed by: Janet Greek
- Written by: J. Michael Straczynski
- Editing by: Skip Robinson
- Production code: 209
- Original air date: February 1, 1995

Guest appearances
- Fredric Lehne (Ranger); Malachi Throne (Centauri Prime Minister); Jeff Conaway (Zack Allan); William Forward (Refa); Turhan Bey (Centauri Emperor)

Episode chronology
← Previous "A Race Through Dark Places"	Next → "Gropos"

"The Coming of Shadows" is a key episode from the second season of the science fiction television series Babylon 5. It won the 1996 Hugo Award for Best Dramatic Presentation.

== Synopsis ==
The Centauri Emperor, knowing that he will die soon, makes arrangements to travel to Babylon 5 to meet with Narn Ambassador G'Kar in neutral territory and offer a public apology on behalf of the Centauri people for their occupation and enslavement of the Narn homeworld, though this reason is not made public. G'Kar, on hearing the news of the emperor's visit, makes plans to assassinate him, while Centauri Ambassador Londo Mollari and his ally Lord Refa believe that the emperor's actions have led to a decline of the Centauri Republic and plan to confront the emperor on this.

The Emperor arrives, meeting the human command staff of the station, and requests a meeting with Vorlon Ambassador Kosh before he leaves the station. A reception for the Emperor is planned, and the attendees are stunned by seeing G'Kar there. The Emperor collapses before he can make the reception. Dr. Franklin determines the Emperor only has a short time to live, and the Emperor requests that he pass word on to G'Kar about his planned apology. Dr. Franklin tells this to G'Kar, who is astonished and humbled by the act.

While the emperor is on his deathbed, Refa urges Londo to take initiative as to sway their supporters on Centauri Prime as to assure Londo will become the next emperor. Londo, against advice of his aide Vir, decides to send a fleet of Centauri warships to a Narn colony on a planet in Quadrant 14. Refa warns the size of the fleet will not be enough to take the planet before he leaves. Privately, Londo tells Vir to contact Mr. Morden, the human spokesman for the Shadows, and to arrange for the Shadows to attack the colony before the Centauri ships arrive. Vir follows the orders, but tells Londo he will regret this decision. Later, G'Kar offers to buy Londo a drink in light of the emperor's apology, unaware of Londo's recent action.

The Narn colony is attacked by the Shadows and rendered defenseless. The Centauri ships arrive, which are shortly seen by Narn fighters investigating the attack. Word is relayed to the Narn homeworld, and soon across the system, that the Centauri have taken their colony.

Kosh meets with the Emperor, and tells him that the situation will end "in fire". With the Emperor near death, Refa and Londo meet him at his deathbed. The Emperor whispers something in Londo's ear before he dies. Londo states that the Emperor approved of the attack on the Narn colony, and that he wants Refa and Londo to carry his people "back to the stars". In private Londo tells Refa that the Emperor told him they were both damned, but Refa shrugs it off as "a small price to pay for immortality". G'Kar learns of the attack and attempts to kill Londo before he is restrained by security forces. At the council chambers, Sheridan manages to successfully bluff Mollari into allowing the Narn colonists to return to their homeworld. G'Kar announces that the Narn government is formally at war with the Centauri.

A second plotline involves a mysterious man who has been following Chief Garibaldi around. When Garibaldi confronts and arrests him, the man gives him a recorded message from Jeffrey Sinclair, the Earth Alliance Ambassador to Minbar. Sinclair tells Garibaldi that a "terrible darkness" is coming and that he has become involved with a military force called the "Rangers" to fight it. Garibaldi agrees to allow the Rangers to operate on the station and to keep their presence a secret, even from Sheridan. In return Garibaldi asks the Rangers to provide him with information they learn which could affect the station's security, to which the Ranger agrees. Delenn is also given a recorded message by the Ranger.

== Production ==
The 1996 Hugo was won in part due to "campaigning" which was in part done online. Straczynski believes that the series failed to gain a 1995 Hugo nomination due to "too many solid episodes" causing a split.

The Star Trek: Deep Space Nine episode “The Visitor" was also nominated for a Hugo Award that year ; reviewer Keith DeCandido wrote that he was present at the Hugo Awards in Los Angeles at the time and noted that the clip they showed for the episode cut off before the emotional scene between Captain Sisko and his son – while he liked Babylon 5's "The Coming of Shadows", he felt that “The Visitor" was "seriously robbed".

== Reception ==
Entertainment and news website Geek.com included "The Coming of Shadows" as "essential watching" for season two. Geek.com writer Graham Templeton wrote that "one of my personal favorites, this is another pure-plot episode. Its kicks the real-war parallels into high gear, and begins to darken its view of human (and alien) nature significantly."

The A.V. Club called "The Coming of Shadows" the "defining episode" of the show.
