= Babylon 5: The River of Souls =

- TNT Promotional Poster
- Genre: Space opera; Drama
- Created by: J. Michael Straczynski
- Written by: J. Michael Straczynski
- Directed by: Janet Greek
- Starring: Jerry Doyle; Tracy Scoggins; Jeff Conaway; Richard Biggs; Ian McShane; Martin Sheen
- Theme music composer: Christopher Franke
- Country of origin: United States
- Original language: English

Production
- Executive producers: Douglas Netter; J. Michael Straczynski
- Producers: John Copeland; Skip Beaudine
- Cinematography: Fred V. Murphy
- Editor: Suzanne Sternlicht
- Running time: 94 minutes
- Production companies: Babylonian Productions; Warner Bros. Television

Original release
- Network: TNT
- Release: November 8, 1998

Babylon 5: The River of Souls is the third feature-length film set in the Babylon 5 universe. It was originally broadcast on November 8, 1998, on TNT, as one of two films shown over the 1998–1999 season to fill in the gap between the fifth season of Babylon 5 and the spin-off series Crusade.

== Plot synopsis ==
After a short absence from Babylon 5, Michael Garibaldi returns to the station to meet with a person in his employ. An archaeologist in search of a means of immortality brings his most recent find to Babylon 5 – an orb containing one billion souls of an extinct race. Within days, a Soul Hunter (Martin Sheen) arrives claiming the orb was stolen from his people. With the assistance of the archaeologist, the souls break free from their captivity in the orb and bring havoc to the station.

== Cast ==
- Jerry Doyle as Michael Garibaldi
- Tracy Scoggins as Capt. Elizabeth Lochley
- Jeff Conaway as Security Chief Zack Allan
- Richard Biggs as Stephen Franklin
- Ian McShane as Dr. Robert Bryson
- Martin Sheen as Soul Hunter
- Josh Coxx as Lt. David Corwin (credited as Joshua Cox)
- Stuart Pankin as James Riley
- Joel Brooks as Jacob Mayhew
- Jeff Doucette as 2nd Man
- Jeff Silverman as Mr. Clute
- Wayne Alexander as Soul One
- Bob Amaral as Customer
- Beege Barkette as Woman (as Beece Barkett)
- T.J. Hoban as Male Hologram
- Ray Proscia as Klaus
- Nikki Ziering as Female Hologram
- Jean St. James as Sheila
