= Michael O'Hare =

American stage and television actor (1952–2012)

- O'Hare as Jeffrey Sinclair in Babylon 5
- Born: Robert Michael O'Hare Jr. May 6, 1952; Chicago, Illinois, U.S.
- Died: September 28, 2012 (aged 60); New York City, New York, U.S.
- Education: Harvard University; Juilliard School
- Occupation: Actor
- Years active: 1972–2000
- Spouse: Ruth O'Hare (m. 1998)

Robert Michael O'Hare Jr. (May 6, 1952 – September 28, 2012) was an American actor who performed on stage and television. He was best known for playing the lead role of space station Commander Jeffrey Sinclair in the first season of the science fiction television series Babylon 5.

== Early life and education ==
Robert Michael O'Hare Jr. was born in Chicago, Illinois and grew up in Chicago Heights. His father, Robert Michael O'Hare Sr., was of Irish descent while his mother, Sally O'Hare (née Crisanti) was of Italian descent. He attended Chicago's Mendel Catholic Preparatory High School, where he played football, to defy his doctor who told him he would never be in athletics because of his asthma. He received several awards and scholarship offers based on his football ability and scholastic performance.

Coming from a career military family, he considered joining the US Navy or having a career in professional football but attended Harvard University, where he studied English literature and played on the Harvard Crimson football team. He joined the university's drama groups and was a performer in The Wrongway Inn, the Hasty Pudding Theatricals' production for 1972. That same year, he went for an "acting tryout" to the New York area, and was cast as Beef Saunders in Good News! at Goodspeed Musicals. He was a member of the Harvard Glee Club during its 1973 World Tour. He left Harvard in 1974 to study at the Juilliard School of Drama. He later took lessons from Sanford Meisner in the mid-1980s.

== Career ==
O'Hare appeared in a number of theatrical productions on Broadway and in regional theaters, including an acclaimed revival of Shaw's Man and Superman with Philip Bosco; in the role of Col. Jessup in the original stage version of A Few Good Men; as Captain Solyony in Chekhov's Three Sisters. Other notable roles included Alfred in a 1986 stage revival of Little Murders; Jake in A Lie of the Mind and John in Lips Together, Teeth Apart.

He was the first white actor nominated by the African-American theater community of New York for the AUDELCO Award for Best Actor, for his performance as Captain Jaap van Tonder in Michael Picardie's play Shades of Brown, about apartheid in South Africa.

He co-starred in the biographical TV movie Marciano and an unsold TV pilot Keefer with William Conrad in the late 1970s. In the 1980s, he appeared mainly as guest on a range of television shows, including Trapper John, M.D.; T.J. Hooker; Kate & Allie; The Equalizer; Tales from the Darkside; and Rage of Angels: The Story Continues.

He was the lead character in Michael Lengsfield's CINE-award-winning short film Short Term Bonds in 1988, screened at the 1989 Sundance festival.

In 1992, he was cast in the lead role of Commander Jeffrey Sinclair in the science fiction television series Babylon 5. He appeared in the pilot and throughout the show's first season in 1994. He left the cast for mental health reasons that were not disclosed at the time, but made guest appearances in the second and third seasons.

Subsequently, he had one guest role on The Cosby Mysteries and appeared twice on Law & Order, the last time in 2000. He did some voiceover work for commercials and read a radio adaptation of the science fiction novella Think Like a Dinosaur for Seeing Ear Theater.

After 2000, he retired from acting and rarely made public appearances.

== Illness and death ==
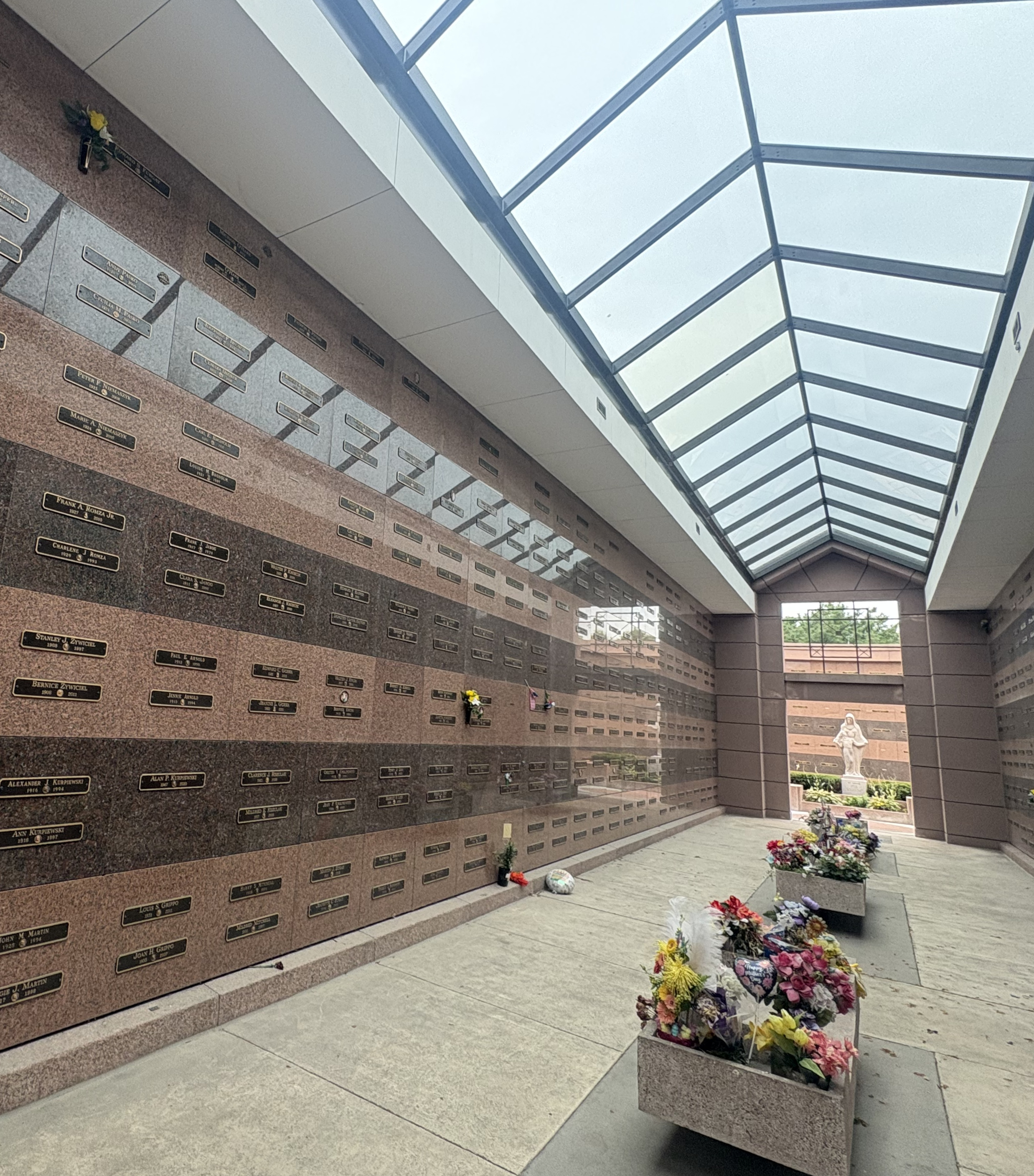
O'Hare's grave (top row, second from left) at St. Adalbert Cemetery

Babylon 5 creator J. Michael Straczynski revealed after O'Hare's death that the actor suffered from severe mental illness. During the filming of the first season of Babylon 5, O'Hare began having paranoid delusions, and, halfway through, his hallucinations worsened. It became increasingly difficult for O'Hare to continue working, his behavior was becoming increasingly erratic, and he was often at odds with his colleagues. Straczynski offered to suspend production for several months to accommodate treatment; O'Hare feared that a hiatus would put the series at risk and he did not want to jeopardize others' jobs. Straczynski agreed to keep O'Hare's condition secret to protect his career and O'Hare agreed to complete the first season but would be written out of the second season so that he could seek treatment. His departure from the cast was announced without explanation, except that it was mutual and amicable.

His treatments were only partially successful. He reappeared in a cameo appearance early in season two ("The Coming of Shadows") and returned in season three for a two-part episode ("War Without End") which closed his character's story arc. At that time, Straczynski promised O'Hare to keep his condition secret "to my grave". O'Hare told him to instead "keep the secret to my grave", arguing that fans deserved to eventually learn the real reason for his departure, and that his experience could raise awareness and understanding for people with mental illness. He made no further appearances on Babylon 5 but continued to support the show and appeared at conventions and signing events until his retirement from public appearances in 2000.

On September 28, 2012, Straczynski posted that O'Hare had had a heart attack in New York City five days earlier and had remained in a coma until his death that day. Eight months later, Straczynski revealed the circumstances of O'Hare's departure from Babylon 5 at a presentation about the series at the Phoenix Comicon.

He was interred at St. Adalbert Cemetery in Niles, Illinois.

== Filmography ==
=== Film ===
Year	Title	Role	Notes
1979	The Promise	Ben Avery	
1981	The Pursuit of DB Cooper	Car Owner	
1984	C.H.U.D.	Fuller	
1989	Last Exit to Brooklyn	Riot Police Officer	
1990	The Ambulance	Hal	

=== Television ===
Year	Title	Role	Notes
1981	McClain's Law	Robert Mellie	1 episode
1981	Jessica Novak	Eddie Danova	1 episode
1982	TJ Hooker	Cal Jastrow	1 episode
1982	Trapper John, M.D.	Jensen	1 episode
1982	Kate & Allie	Richard Curtis	1 episode
1986	The Equalizer	Alex	Episode: "Wash Up"
1986	Tales from the Darkside	Jimmy	1 episode
1987	One Life to Live	George Vasquez	1 episode
1985–1990	Another World	Fire Captain/Pilot	3 episodes
1991	L.A. Law	Dr. Michael Lattimer	1 episode
1993–1996	Babylon 5	Jeffrey Sinclair	26 episodes
1997–2000	Law and Order	Mr. Tobin / Roy Lawlor	2 episodes

== Broadway ==
- Players (1978)
- Man and Superman (1979) as Hector Malone Jr.
- A Few Good Men (1989) as Col. Jessup
- The Crucible (1991)
