= Babylon 5: The Legend of the Rangers =

American TV film

- Sci Fi Channel promotional poster
- Genre: Space opera; Drama
- Based on: Characters by J. Michael Straczynski
- Written by: J. Michael Straczynski
- Directed by: Michael Vejar
- Starring: Dylan Neal; Alex Zahara; Myriam Sirois; Mackenzie Gray; Andreas Katsulas
- Music by: Christopher Franke
- Country of origin: United States
- Original language: English

Production
- Executive producers: Douglas Netter; J. Michael Straczynski
- Producer: Ron McLeod
- Production location: Vancouver
- Cinematography: Henry Chan
- Editor: Stein Myhrstad
- Running time: 90 minutes
- Production companies: Babylonian Productions; Legendary Films Inc.; Warner Bros. Television

Original release
- Network: Sci Fi Channel
- Release: January 19, 2002

Babylon 5: The Legend of the Rangers (subtitled: To Live and Die in Starlight) is the fifth telefilm set in the Babylon 5 universe (not including the pilot, The Gathering).

Originally airing January 19, 2002, on the Sci Fi Channel (now Syfy), it was written by J. Michael Straczynski and directed by Mike Vejar. Though shot as a pilot for a possible new series, it aired opposite NFL playoffs and the subsequent poor ratings led to it not being picked up.

== Rangers in Babylon 5 ==
Rangers, termed Anla-shok in the fictional Minbari language, are warriors in the Babylon 5 media franchise. The Ranger order was formed by Valen during the First Shadow War. When the three castes refused to work with him to defeat the Shadows, Valen went outside the caste system to organize a group of warriors.

After the First Shadow War, the Rangers became dormant. When Jeffrey Sinclair took leadership of the Rangers while he was ambassador on Minbar, he took Valen's title of Entil'Zha or "The One Who Creates the Future".

When the Shadows made their first openly aggressive acts, the force swung into action and became a central part of the opposing alliance. Sinclair, Delenn, and John Sheridan each factored in Ranger leadership throughout the events depicted in the television series. While several actors including Bryan Cranston depicted individual rangers, Marcus Cole was the only ranger featured as series main cast.

Rangers recruited from both Minbari and Humans during the events of the series. In addition to distinctive regalia, they used collapsible Minbari fighting pikes which could be pocketed, then extended to staff length for use. In space combat, rangers often crewed White Star class vessels.

== Plot synopsis ==
As the Shadow War ended, hundreds of civilizations were devastated. It is up to the Interstellar Alliance, with the help of the Rangers, to rebuild what the great war had destroyed and to hold peace among the worlds of the ISA.

In the year 2265, David Martel (Dylan Neal), a Ranger, is given the command of a twenty-year-old Ranger starship, Liandra, and is asked to escort a Valen-class cruiser to a secret location carrying several diplomats, including Ambassador G'Kar (Andreas Katsulas). Upon arrival, the two craft are attacked on behalf of an unknown, mysterious, and ancient force known only as The Hand whose lethal power is far greater than any previously known to Earth or any other world in the Interstellar Alliance.

== Cast ==
- Dylan Neal as David Martell
- Alex Zahara as Dulann
- Myriam Sirois as Sarah Cantrell
- Mackenzie Gray as Kafta
- Andreas Katsulas as G'Kar
- Dean Marshall as Malcolm Bridges
- Warren Takeuchi as Kitaro "Kit" Sasaki
- Jennie Rebecca Hogan as Na'Feel
- David Storch as Tafeek
- Enid-Raye Adams as Firell
- Gus Lynch as Tirk
