= Jeffrey Sinclair =

- Babylon 5 character
- First appearance: Babylon 5: In the Beginning (chronological) (last airdate), The Gathering (airdate)
- Last appearance: Babylon 5: The Road Home
- Portrayed by: Michael O'Hare
- Voiced by: Paul Guyet (Babylon 5: The Road Home)

In-universe information
- Species: Human
- Position: Commander (Season 1), Ambassador to Minbar
- Home planet: Mars
- Affiliated with: Earth Alliance, Rangers

Jeffrey Sinclair is a fictional character on the space opera television series titled Babylon 5. He is the original Commander of the Babylon 5 space station.

Portrayed by Michael O'Hare, the character appeared regularly on the first season of the show and made a number of guest appearances early in season two ("The Coming of Shadows") and returned in season three for a two-part episode ("War Without End").

In the second season, Sinclair was succeeded as space station Commander by John J. Sheridan (portrayed by Bruce Boxleitner.)

== Role in Babylon 5 ==
=== Character arc ===
Jeffrey Sinclair is introduced in the 1993 pilot film, Babylon 5: The Gathering, which takes place roughly one year before the first-season episode "Midnight on the Firing Line".

Jeffrey Sinclair was born on the Mars Colony. During the first season of Babylon 5, Sinclair states that his family had been fighter pilots "ever since the Battle of Britain" and that his father was a fighter pilot for EarthForce who participated in the last battle of the "Dilgar Invasion." Sinclair continued this family tradition by becoming a fighter pilot. The season one episode "By Any Means Necessary" establishes that Sinclair received Jesuit education as a young man.

Sinclair was promoted to fighter pilot and — less than a year later — promoted to squadron leader. Due to his rapid rise through the ranks, it was rumored that he was on the fast track to making admiral. In the made-for-television film, Babylon 5: In the Beginning, Sinclair fights during the last major battle in the Earth-Minbari War. His squadron is destroyed by the Minbari and he is captured for interrogation by the Grey Council. The Triluminary reveals that Sinclair possesses Minbari DNA and the soul of a Minbari hero who led their people to victory in a battle against the Shadows one-thousand years ago. Concluding that Minbari souls are being born into human bodies, the Minbari opt to surrender despite possessing overwhelming military superiority. Once the Minbari return Sinclair to his fighter, he loses his memory of his time aboard the Minbari cruiser.

When the Babylon 5 space station was established, Sinclair was appointed as the leader by the Minbari race who were responsible for its creation. He was selected over many senior officers, including Colonel Ari Ben Zayn, all of whom had been vetoed by the Minbari.

In Babylon 5 season 2, Sinclair was reassigned as ambassador to Minbar. He was succeeded at Babylon 5 by Captain John Sheridan. As ambassador, he took command of the Rangers. In 2260, Sinclair received a 900-year old letter from himself on Minbar, revealing that he was not the reincarnation of Valen, as the Grey Council believed, but in fact Valen himself. Armed with this knowledge, Sinclair took Babylon 4 back with him 1,000 years to aid the Minbari in their first war against the Shadows and, in so doing, fulfilled Minbari prophecy by becoming the One Who Was. Sinclair uses the Triluminary to transform himself into a Minbari and fulfills the legend about Valen being "a Minbari not born of Minbari."

=== Relationships ===
Sinclair enlisted in EarthForce in 2237. While working as a flight instructor at EarthForce Academy, he met second-year cadet Catherine Sakai. This marked the beginning of a 15 year on-again off-again relationship. Sinclair proposes to Sakai during the season one finale; this episode marks Sinclair and Sakai's final regular appearances in the series.

== Departure and reception ==
After filming one full season, O'Hare and the series executive producer/creator J. Michael Straczynski mutually decided for the actor (and character) to depart as a series regular. Straczynski announced O'Hare's departure via a written statement posted on GEnie on May 20, 1994:

This is a mutual, amicable, and friendly separation. This isn't a Tasha Yar situation. Moreover, we will be handling this in such a way that, down the road, Sinclair could potentially return to the story. ...I take pains to mention this because both Michael [O'Hare] and I want it clear that we both believe in the show, and want this in no way to interfere with the series. He has asked me to convey for him his encouragement, his best wishes, and to emphasize that this is, again, an amicable and friendly separation.

Responding to backlash from fans, Straczynski added: "Please do not stick this on O'Hare. Whatever decisions get made, it is up to the producers — me and Doug — to implement those decisions, so ultimate responsibility rests with me. If you're going to be angry at anyone, be angry at me." O'Hare left the series for mental health reasons that were not disclosed at the time.

Straczynski revealed the circumstances of O'Hare's departure from Babylon 5 at a presentation about the series at the 2013 Phoenix Comicon. During the filming of Babylon 5, O'Hare struggled with severe mental illness including paranoid delusions and hallucinations. Straczynski offered to suspend production to let O'Hare seek treatment and return to the show as a series regular; however, O'Hare feared that a long hiatus would put the series at risk and he did not want to jeopardize other people's jobs. Straczynski agreed to keep O'Hare's condition secret to protect his career.

Straczynski emphasized that O'Hare's fans, particularly those of his role as Sinclair, had helped him cope with his struggle in ways "medication never could." O'Hare told Straczynski that fans deserved to eventually learn the real reason for his departure, and that his experience could raise awareness and understanding for people with mental illness.

O'Hare reprised the character of Sinclair on season two and had a two-episode guest appearance in season three. As a result of his departure, there are several minor inconsistencies between the first season and the remainder of the show, most visibly in "And the Sky Full of Stars" and "Babylon Squared."

In literary analysis of characters in pop culture and science fiction, Jeffrey Sinclair has been examined as a hero and leader.
