= Soul Hunter (Babylon 5) =

- Babylon 5 episode
- Episode no.: Season 1 Episode 2
- Directed by: Jim Johnston
- Written by: J. Michael Straczynski
- Production code: 102
- Original air date: February 2, 1994

Guest appearance
- W. Morgan Sheppard as The Soul Hunter

Episode chronology
← Previous "Midnight on the Firing Line"	Next → "Born to the Purple"

"Soul Hunter" is the second episode of the first season of the science fiction television series, Babylon 5. The episode concerns the arrival of a member of an ancient order, the Soul Hunters, on the Babylon 5 station; and reveals a mystery surrounding Commander Sinclair's missing 24 hours during the Earth-Minbari War. It first aired on 2 February 1994.

== Title ==
The title refers to the Soul Hunter, a member of an ancient alien order which claims they collect and preserve the souls of distinguished people at the moment of death.

== Plot ==
An unknown damaged ship appears through the jump gate and hurtles towards the Babylon 5 station. Commander Sinclair grapples the ship onboard the station with his Starfury fighter, and the ship's occupant is taken to MedLab. In MedLab, upon seeing the patient, the Minbari Ambassador, Delenn, suddenly enters a burst of rage, and tries to shoot the patient. She explains to Sinclair that the patient is a "Shak Tot", a Soul Hunter, a member of an ancient alien order who try to collect and preserve the souls of distinguished people at the moment of death. The Minbari despise them, considering them thieves and kidnappers, "ripping away that which is eternal". Delenn urges Sinclair to send the Soul Hunter away while he still can.

The alien population aboard the station has gone into hiding, and several ships have asked to leave the station ahead of schedule. The Soul Hunter explains to Sinclair that his order are not thieves, merely preservers. They had been prevented from "preserving" the soul of the Minbari leader Dukhat at the beginning of the Earth-Minbari War. Sinclair asks the Soul Hunter to leave as soon as his ship is repaired.

The Soul Hunter recognizes Delenn from his previous attempt to "preserve" Dukhat's soul for his collection. He identifies Delenn as a "Satai" – a member of the nine-member Grey Council, the ruling body of the Minbari people – asking her why, as a great leader of the Minbari, she is here "playing ambassador".

A second Soul Hunter arrives on board Babylon 5. He explains to Sinclair that the first Soul Hunter is a disturbed renegade. Having failed to "preserve" Dukhat's soul, he has become increasingly frustrated and unstable; and he has turned to killing people before their natural death in order to capture their souls.

Meanwhile, the first Soul Hunter has kidnapped Delenn, and starts to drain her life force. In doing so, he catches a glimpse of her hidden purposes on the station, exclaiming, "You plan such a thing? Incredible." Sinclair locates them, resulting in an exchange of gunfire. The Soul Hunter says, "Why do you fight for her? Don't you understand? She is "Satai" ... I've seen her soul: they're using you." Sinclair is thrown to the ground. The Soul Hunter's soul-capturing machine, trained upon on Delenn, activates. Sinclair gets up and turns the soul-draining machine away from Delenn and trains the beam onto the Soul Hunter. The Soul Hunter cries out, and he falls to the ground, his soul being captured by the machine and transferred into a spherical soul vessel.

As Delenn recovers in the MedLab, Sinclair in his quarters does a search for the Minbari word "Satai", discovering that Delenn is a member of the Minbari Grey Council. Later, Sinclair escorts the second Soul Hunter off the station, telling him that the Soul Hunters are not welcome aboard the station. The Soul Hunter enquires what became of his brother's collection of soul vessels.

Delenn sits cross-legged in her quarters, with the Soul Hunter's soul vessels, setting the souls free one by one.

== Writing and story arc significance ==
As Babylon 5 was conceived with an overall five-year story arc, the episode was written as both an individual story and with another level, where the hints of the larger story arc were given, such as Delenn's secrecy about her role on the Grey Council. The series' creator, J. Michael Straczynski, indicates that the episodes can be watched for the individual stories, the character stories, or the story arc.

Regarding the dilemma posed by the opposing views on the afterlife of the soul hunter and Delenn, Straczynski writes,

If there is no afterlife, then all our experiences, all that we were, dies when we die. In that case, wouldn't it be significantly greater if we could preserve that knowledge somehow, in order to gain from their experiences ...? Conversely, if there is an afterlife, a selfish desire to keep an important person's essence in order to educate the survivors would be catastrophic for the deceased individual – not to mention messing with the natural order.

In relation to the question of the existence of souls, Straczynski writes, "I carefully don't address that issue in the course of the script. My job is not to provide people with answers. My job as a storyteller is to ask questions and provoke discussions and start bar fights."

Straczynski also singles out the mystery surrounding Delenn. He writes, "that also ties in with Sinclair's mysteries. Clearly, something suspicious is going on with the Minbari, and it all connects to the war with Earth ten years prior. All very important, and as usual, something that will payoff in the future".

This episode discusses the question of souls, which will become central to the story arc, linking with Sinclair's missing twenty-four hours during the Earth-Minbari War, and the Minbari insisting on his appointment as commander of Babylon 5. It sets up for the revelation about Sinclair which Lennier reveals in "Points of Departure", the opening episode of season two; but the entire truth will not be seen until the second half of the third season. When the Soul Hunter reveals to Sinclair that the Minbari are using him, he is referring to the Minbari setting him in a position to become their religious leader. The episode also gives some background regarding the death of Dukhat, the Minbari leader, and the beginning of the Earth-Minbari War.

== Production ==
=== Cast and filming ===
The Soul Hunter was played by W. Morgan Sheppard, an actor with a theater background. Mira Furlan, who played Delenn, said, "He has such a theater background, which reminded me of my past in Yugoslavia, all the stories, the theater stories, the old actors. It was as if I were thrown back into the theater, the heavy stage acting with which I was so familiar. The European flair was there, and we had a nice time working together.

The episode was directed by Jim Johnston, who directed a large number of Babylon 5 episodes, directing six in the first season. "Soul Hunter" was his first experience at directing science fiction. Johnston stated that he liked the sets, with their long corridors which allowed him to use a steadicam and long dolly moves around the set. Johnston employed dark lighting to create a mysterious mood for the episode. He worked together with Morgan Sheppard to create an alien feel to the character of the Soul Hunter. Sheppard came up with the idea of walking in such a way that he seemed to float, and a gown was created for him so that his feet moving could not be seen.

The episode introduced the character of Dr Franklin, played by Richard Biggs. Biggs had already filmed the fourth episode, 'Infection', which helped him for the filming of the arrival of the doctor on the station. Biggs stated, "I had gotten a little bit more secure and a little bit more relaxed and then got to play the entrance of the character."

=== Visual effects and sound ===
For its visual effects scenes, Babylon 5 pioneered the use of computer-generated imagery (CGI) scenes – instead of using more expensive physical models – in a television series. This also enabled motion effects which are difficult to create using models, such as the rotation of fighter craft along multiple axes, as seen when Sinclair's fighter matches the rotation of the soul hunter's spinning ship in order to grapple it; or the rotation and banking of a virtual camera. The visual effects were created by Foundation Imaging using 24 Commodore Amiga 2000 computers with Lightwave 3D and Video Toaster software, 16 of which were dedicated to rending each individual frame of CGI, with each frame taking on average 45 minutes to render. In-house resource management software managed the workload of the Amiga computers to ensure that no machine was left idle during the image rendering process.

The Starfury fighter, which Commander Sinclair uses to grapple the Soul Hunter ship, was designed by Steve Burg as a function-driven design for a plausible zero-gravity fighter. The positioning of the four engine pods at the extremities of the craft was inspired by Ron Cobb's design for the Gunstar fighter from The Last Starfighter. The basic shape of the Starfury's wings was inspired by an earlier unused design by Burg for a military robot fighting machine, which he had originally designed for Terminator 2. This was merged with the multi-engined configuration to form the Starfury design. Burg points out that the wings/struts were not aerodynamic: they were there to lever the engines away from the center of mass.

The Soul Hunter ships were designed by Foundation Imaging co-founder Ron Thornton. He indicated, "I did get away with making the [virtual digital model's textures] out of wood, and bone. As if it used the tusks of some unknown huge beast for parts."

The scene where Sinclair's Starfury grapples the spinning soul hunter ship attempts to show the fighter using thrusters to manoeuvre using realistic physics. Thornton stated that the producers "initially wanted Star Wars, there was also a lot of, '[let's] do something that Star Trek can't!' I said we could make realistic physics more exciting, and make the fans happy ... [Visual effects supervisor Paul Bryant] and I pushed really hard for realistic physics as we both loved 2001".

Writer J. Michael Straczynski's original intention was that Sinclair's ship was to use magnetic energy to capture the Soul Hunter's ship. However, Thornton suggested using a grappling arm instead, stating, "I wanted to try something more interesting that hadn't been seen before. It was also a good opportunity to help me solidify to Joe and John how we could make the real physics exciting and make the pilots of the Starfuries seem like Top Guns. But not like Star Wars, as we could have our own distinctive and very different look." The scene was animated by Foundation Imaging artists Tim Wilcox and Mark Kochinski.

The Babylon 5 makeup department involved in this episode – consisting of Everett Burrell, Greg Funk, Mary Kay Morse, Ron Pipes and John Vulich – won the 1994 Emmy Award for Outstanding Individual Achievement in Makeup for a Series for episode 5 of the season, "The Parliament of Dreams"

Music for the title sequence and the episode was provided by the series' composer, Christopher Franke.

== Commentary and reviews ==
Author Jane Killick writes that "Soul Hunter" was the episode where Babylon 5 started to meet the expectations of many people. She observes, "All the elements are there: a good story, strong characterization, action, pace, special effects and a contribution to the story arc." She notes that "Soul Hunter" was a strong episode for Delenn, exploring the character in greater depth than previously: showing her gentleness, strength and the mystery of her plans on Babylon 5.

Rowan Kaiser, writing in The A.V. Club, draws the parallel between the previous episode, being an exposition for Londo and G'Kar, and this episode, as an exposition for Sinclair and Delenn. Kaiser is intrigued by the philosophical opposition of the views of the soul hunter, who feels he is preserving souls, and those of Delenn, who feels he is keeping souls from their eternal destiny. Kaiser writes, "'Soul Hunter' may be an average episode, saddled by a bit too much ambition and a few too many flaws, but that's why, as a critic, I find myself drawn to it. It's trying to say and do big things, and the effort is worth examining."

Elias Rosner writes in Multiversity Comics, "As a second episode, you could do with much worse than 'Soul Hunter.' It's got a creepy antagonist, a personal motivation/connection for one of the characters, ... to said antagonist, and keeps its focus on the central plotline for the entire episode." However, Rosner feels that the exaggerated dramatics are a weakness which may outweigh the episode's strengths. He notes that the unanswered questions raised in the episode – concerning the Grey Council, Delenn's membership of it, the secrecy surrounding this, and how they are using Sinclair – give us reason to watch Delenn closely in subsequent episodes to try to discover what her game is. He concludes, "this episode, despite all its flaws, shows what can be done when in the right hands.
