= Andreas Katsulas =

American actor (1946–2006)

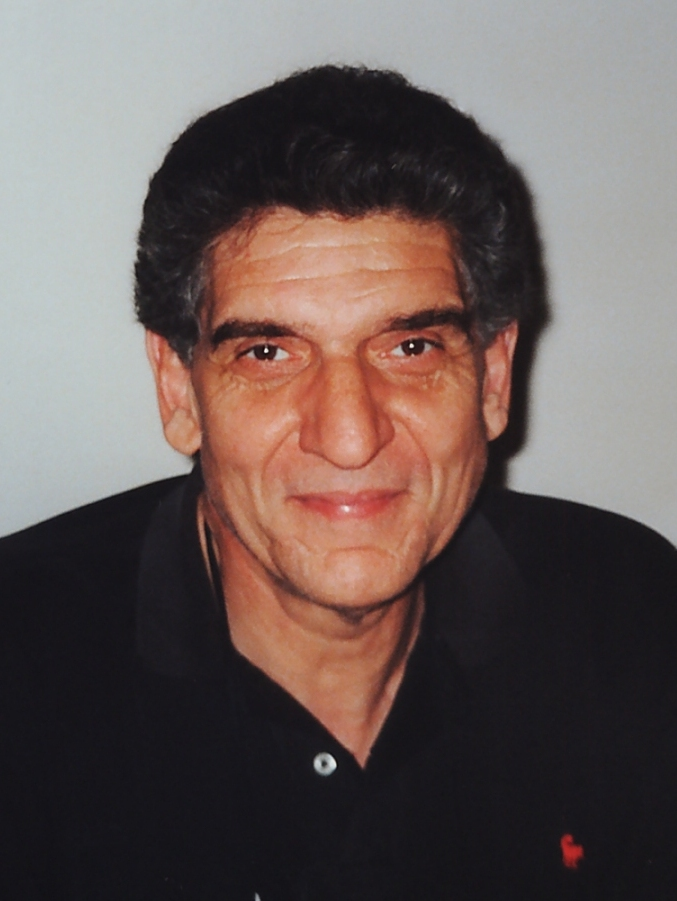
- Katsulas in 2000
- Born: Andrew Katsulas; May 18, 1946; St. Louis, Missouri, U.S.
- Died: February 13, 2006 (aged 59); Los Angeles, California, U.S.
- Occupation: Actor
- Years active: 1960–2006
- Spouses: Marva Marie Kadane (m. 1967, divorced) Gilla Nissan Katsulas (before 2006)
- Children: 2
- Website: andreaskatsulas.com

Andrew Katsulas (May 18, 1946 – February 13, 2006), known professionally as Andreas Katsulas, (Note: /ɑːnˈdreɪəs kəˈtsuːləs/ ahn-DRAY-əs kə-TSOO-ləs) was an American film and television actor, most recognized for portrayals of Narn Ambassador G'Kar on the American science fiction television series Babylon 5 and Romulan Commander Tomalak on Star Trek: The Next Generation.

== Life and career ==
Born in St. Louis, Missouri in 1946, to a working-class Greek-American family, Katsulas earned a master's degree in theatre from Indiana University Bloomington. He started an acting career that took him from South American barrios to Lincoln Center. From 1971 to 1986, he toured with Peter Brook's International Theatre Company, performing improvisational and prepared theater pieces. In 1981 and 1982, he appeared on the CBS daytime drama (soap opera) Guiding Light as Lucien Goff.

Katsulas appeared in various films, including The Sicilian, Next of Kin, Someone to Watch Over Me, Sunset, Hot Shots! Part Deux, and Executive Decision. He played the one-armed villain Fredrick Sykes in The Fugitive (1993).

Katsulas was a regular on the television series Babylon 5 (1994–1998), where he portrayed the Narn Ambassador G'Kar. He played the Romulan Commander Tomalak on Star Trek: The Next Generation.

== Death ==
Katsulas died of lung cancer on February 13, 2006, at the age of 59. He was survived by his wife, Gilla Nissan Katsulas, and his two children from a previous marriage.

== Filmography ==
=== Film ===
Year	Title	Role	Notes
1974	O-key, file	Unknown	
1979	Série noire	Andreas Tikides	
1979	Milo Milo	Nicolos	
1981	Ragtime	Policeman #3	
1984	Nothing Lasts Forever	Lunar Shopping Observer	
1985	Agent on Ice	Ray Donnelli	
1987	Someone to Watch Over Me	Joey Venza	
1987	The Sicilian	Passatempo	
1988	Sunset	Arthur	
1989	Next of Kin	Johnny "Papa John" Isabella	
1989	Communion	Alex	
1991	True Identity	Anthony	
1991	Write to Kill	Chambliss	
1992	Blame It on the Bellboy	Scarpa	
1993	Hot Shots! Part Deux	Rufshaad	
1993	The Fugitive	Fredrick Sykes	
1993	Painted Desert	Franco Vitalli	
1993	New York Cop	Ferrara	
1996	Executive Decision	Abu El-Sayed Jaffa	
1998	Mafia!	Narducci	
2000	A Piece of Eden	Giuseppe Tredici	

=== Television ===
Year	Title	Role	Notes
1979	Mesure pour mesure	Claudio	TV movie
1981	Another World	Dock Site Guard	Episode: "4381"
1982	American Playhouse	Markos	Episode: "Kings of America"
1982	ABC Afterschool Special	Zachary Pscharapolus	Episode: "A Very Delicate Matter"
1982	Guiding Light	Lucien Goff	1 episode
1982	A Midsummer Night's Dream	Snout	TV movie
1987	L'heure Simenon	Le 'Yougo'	Episode: "Un nouveau dans la ville"
1987–1988	Max Headroom	Mr. Bartlett	3 episodes
1988	The Equalizer	Warren Briggs	Episode: "Video Games"
1988	Houston Knights	Unknown	Episode: "Cajun Spice"
1988	Crime Story	Government Agent	Episode: "Pauli Taglia's Dream"
1988	Steal the Sky	Colonel Gemayel	TV movie
1989	Father Dowling Mysteries	Assistant District Attorney Douglas	
1989	Alien Nation	Koulak	Episode: "The Game"
1989	The Neon Empire	Vito	TV movie
1989–1994	Star Trek: The Next Generation	Commander Tomalak	4 episodes
1990	Jake and the Fatman	Everett Ashford	Episode: "You Turned the Tables on Me"
1990	Mancuso, F.B.I.	Prince Fahid Ahami	Episode: "Ahami Awry Kidnapped"
1990	The Death of the Incredible Hulk	Kasha	TV movie
1990	Capital News	Unknown	Episode: "Blues for Mr. White"
1990	Hunter	Nikolai Janosch / Arno Kudriescu	2 episodes
1990	Murder Times Seven	Marco Volatile	TV movie
1991	Murder, She Wrote	Jerry Pappas	Episode: "A Killing in Vegas"
1991	Seduction: Three Tales from the Inner Sanctum	Frank	TV movie
1993	Babylon 5: The Gathering	Narn Ambassador G'Kar	TV pilot
1994	Diagnosis: Murder	DEA Agent	Episode: "The Plague"
1994–1998	Babylon 5	Ambassador G'Kar	109 episodes
1997	The Real Adventures of Jonny Quest	The Robot Spies	Voice, Animated series
1997	Path to Paradise	Sheik Omar Abdel-Rahman	TV movie
1998	Babylon 5: In the Beginning	Ambassador G'Kar	TV movie
1999	Millennium	Moses Gourevitch	Episode: "Forcing the End"
2002	Babylon 5: The Legend of the Rangers	G'Kar	TV movie
2003	Star Trek: Enterprise	Vissian Captain Drennik	Episode: "Cogenitor"
2003	NYPD Blue	Ron Szudarek	Episode: "Shear Stupidity"

=== Video games ===
Year	Title	Role	Notes
2003	Primal	Scree	
2006	24: The Game	Governor Radford	
2006	Splinter Cell: Double Agent	Unknown	
