= Richard Biggs =

American actor (1960–2004)

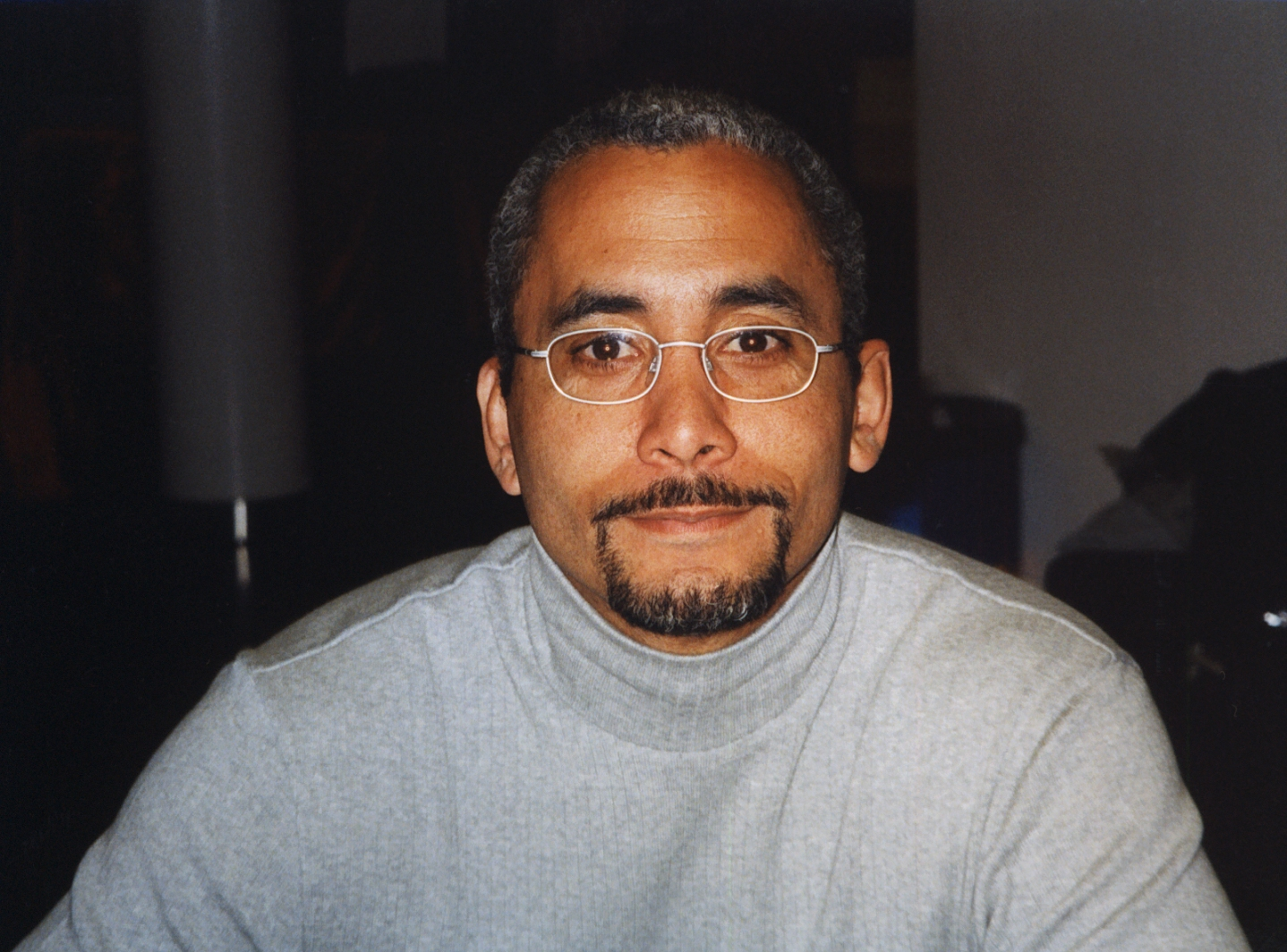
- Richard Biggs at a B5-Event in Stuttgart, Germany, 2000.
- Born: March 18, 1960; Columbus, Ohio, U.S.
- Died: May 22, 2004 (aged 44); Los Angeles, California, U.S.
- Education: University of Southern California
- Occupation: Actor
- Years active: 1985–2004
- Spouse: Lori Kay Biggs (m. 1998)
- Children: 2
- Parent(s): Col. Richard Biggs; Delores Biggs

Richard James Biggs II (March 18, 1960 – May 22, 2004) was an American television and stage actor, known for his roles on the television series Days of Our Lives and Babylon 5.

== Early life ==
Born in Columbus, Ohio, Biggs graduated from Minot High School (Minot, ND). He attended the University of Southern California on scholarship, studying theatre. He briefly taught at a Los Angeles high school before landing his first major television role, that of Dr. Marcus Hunter on the soap opera Days of Our Lives.

Biggs was diagnosed with hearing problems when he was 13, and was partially deaf in one ear, completely deaf in the other. He frequently used his celebrity status to raise money for the Aliso Academy, a private school in Rancho Santa Margarita, California that serves deaf children.

== Career ==
From 1987 until 1994, Biggs played the role of Dr. Marcus Hunter on the soap opera Days of Our Lives.

He appeared as Dr. Stephen Franklin on the well-regarded science fiction series Babylon 5 (1994–1998), reprising the role in the final aired episode of the spin-off show, Crusade ("Each Night I Dream of Home").

After Babylon 5, he played roles on Any Day Now and Strong Medicine, as well as the recurring role of Clayton Boudreaux on the soap opera Guiding Light.

Biggs' stage credits include The Tempest, Cymbeline and The Taming of the Shrew.

At the time of his death, he was a regular on the television series Strong Medicine; following his death, his character was killed in an off-screen traffic accident. He also guest starred as a visiting scientist on Tremors: The Series. Biggs' final film appearance was in Special Report: Zombie Invasion, a short film also featuring Biggs' Babylon 5 co-star, Bruce Boxleitner, released as a companion piece to the 2004 remake of Dawn of the Dead on DVD. His final television appearance was as a guest star on a 2004 episode of the Nickelodeon series Drake & Josh, entitled "The Gary Grill" portraying an FBI agent, which was dedicated to his memory. He won one award in his career, for the Soap Opera Digest Award for Supporting Actor.

== Personal life ==
He grew up on Air Force bases across the United States because his father Colonel Richard Biggs was in the Air Force.

He married Lori Kay Gebers Biggs on August 1, 1998. They have two sons Richard James III and Hunter Lee.

== Death ==
Biggs collapsed at his home in Los Angeles, and died at Providence Saint Joseph Medical Center of complications stemming from aortic dissection on May 22, 2004. He was 44 years old.

== Filmography ==
=== Film ===
Year	Title	Role	Notes
1986	Unnatural Causes	Unknown	
1987	Walk Like a Man	Salesman	
1988	Miracle Mile	Brian Jones	
1992	One Stormy Night	Marcus Hunter	
1995	The Alien Within	Hawkes	
1998	Babylon 5: In the Beginning	Dr. Stephen Franklin	
1998	Babylon 5: Thirdspace	Dr. Stephen Franklin	
1998	Forever Love	Dr. Berris	
1998	Babylon 5: The River of Souls	Dr. Stephen Franklin	
2001	Ablaze	Garrison	

=== Television ===
Year	Title	Role	Notes
1985	Three's a Crowd	Bailiff	Episode: "September Song"
1985	T. J. Hooker	Frawley	Episode: "The Chicago Connection"
1986	Stingray	Cabin Guard	Episode: "As Far as the Eye Can See"
1986	The Twilight Zone	Dr. Tomson	Episode: "The Toys of Caliban"
1987–1992	Days of Our Lives	Marcus Hunter	Regular role
1994–1998	Babylon 5	Stephen Franklin	Series regular
1998-2000	Any Day Now	Detective Bill Moody	20 episodes
2001–2002	Guiding Light	Clayton Boudreux	2 episodes
2003	Tremors	Roger Garrett	2 episodes
2004	Drake & Josh	FBI agent	Episode: "The Gary Grill"; dedicated in memory
2000–2004	Strong Medicine	Milo Morton	Recurring
