= Babylon 5's use of the Internet =

Science fiction fan interactions in the early Internet

Original Babylon 5 Interactive Information Kit

Beginning around 1991, the creator of the television series Babylon 5, J. Michael Straczynski, participated in a number of Internet venues to discuss elements of his work with his fans, including the rec.arts.sf.tv.babylon5 Usenet newsgroup, where he continued to communicate as late as March 2007. This flow of information and feedback had a substantial impact on Babylon 5, as well as Straczynski's other shows and his fan base. This interaction pre-dated the coining of the term "blog", but is functionally similar.

As of June 2023, Straczynski continues to interact with his fans regularly on Twitter, Patreon, and Instagram.

== Internet usage ==
=== Forums ===
Babylon 5 was one of the first shows to employ Internet marketing to create publicity among online readers far in advance of the airing of the pilot episode. Straczynski participated in online communities on Usenet (originally in rec.arts.sf.tv.babylon5 up to 1996), and the GEnie and Compuserve systems before the web came together as it exists today. Straczynski had long participated in many online forums since the 1980s, and is widely credited as being the first notable artist and celebrity to interact with fans online, even before the advent of the World Wide Web.

This free interaction with his fans was not without its problems. A third-season episode ("Passing Through Gethsemane") was originally developed a year earlier in 1994 but had to be "scuttled" because a fan posted a story idea on GEnie that matched the plot of the episode. The story was not put back into the production pipeline until Straczynski could obtain a signed legal release from the fan. The moderated Usenet group was created as a consequence, specifically to filter out story ideas. Straczynski also asked fans not to engage in fan-fiction while the show was in production, and most fans complied with this request.

On rec.arts.sf.tv.babylon5.moderated, Straczynski regularly discussed with fans the process of creating and producing the show, the meaning of the work, and the development of the plot. He confirmed or denied fan theories and interpretations of the show, and answered questions – though often cryptically. In November 1995, Straczynski temporarily left the newsgroup due to an increasing number of flames, but returned in December when a process was put in place to filter the threads that reached him.

=== Fan sites ===
Babylon 5 also inspired a number of fansites. One of the first was The Lurker's Guide to Babylon 5. It was noticed by The Washington Post and acknowledged by Straczynski in a Season 5 DVD commentary. Its root URL at the time, Hyperion, was used on the show as the name of a heavy cruiser. It also received early news from the show's copyright holders.

=== Internet marketing ===
In 1995, Warner Bros. started the Official Babylon 5 web site which was hosted on the now defunct Pathfinder portal. In September 1995 they hired a fan, Troy Rutter, to take over the site and move it not only to its own domain name at www.babylon5.com, but also to oversee the "Keyword B5" area on America Online. The fans continued to play an important role in the development of the series and the online support campaign is credited with helping persuade former PTEN station owners to carry the fourth season of the show in 1996.

Over the course of the series, Warner Bros. encouraged the use of pictures and images on fan web sites, and eventually created a home-page community called AcmeCity where users could create a homepage using logos and graphics without fear of lawsuits. Also during this time, Warner Bros. executive Jim Moloshok created and distributed electronic trading cards to help advertise the series.

A contest was conducted in conjunction with Sound Source Interactive called the Mystery Alien Sweepstakes, with the grand-prize to portray an alien on the show.

== Fan influences ==
- The Babylon 5 pilot, The Gathering, originally featured music by former Police drummer Stewart Copeland. After B5 was greenlighted Straczynski solicited suggestions on GEnie for a replacement composer. After some suggested Tangerine Dream member Christopher Franke, that musician was eventually hired.
- Straczynski hired John E. Hudgens, a fan of the show, and later the Babylon 5 section sysop on GEnie, to create promotional music videos for the show after seeing the original one Hudgens did on his own. They collaborated on a total of eight, and Straczynski would often use one as his introduction at convention appearances. Straczynski commissioned the fifth one (Welcome to the Third Age) to be his pitch reel to sell the show to TNT.
- The spatial location of the B5 station itself is stated as "Grid Epsilon coordinates: 470/18/22." This came about because Straczynski was touched by an outpouring of support from the GEnie Science Fiction and Fantasy RoundTable (SFRT) community in regards to a potential letter-writing campaign that turned out not to be needed after all. He was still grateful, however, and asked how he could show his appreciation. An SFRT participant suggested placing the station at the 3D spatial coordinates corresponding to the GEnie Page (#470, for original SFRT), CATegory (#18, for Non-Trek SFTV Series), and TOPic (#22, for Babylon 5) of what was then the only official B5 Topic on GEnie (the strange capitalization of CATegory and TOPic is because GEnie was command line-based and allowed commands to be abbreviated to three letters). Straczynski agreed and added that info to the series bible used by episode writers. The "Grid Epsilon" part was his own touch, based on the first two letters (which were usually both capitalized) of GEnie itself (since it was originally a GE (General Electric) property).
- B5 fans on GEnie referred to themselves as "Grid Epsilon Irregulars".
- A fictional chemical substance called Quantium-40 was mentioned after Straczynski conducted a contest online to name the substance.
- A Fresh Aire Restaurant waiter was named David after David Strauss, who came up with the name Quantium-40. Another character was named after a fan who helped raise money when one of the actors had not been paid for his conference attendance.
- Babylon 5 fans on the Internet have popularized the <*> symbol ("the ASCII Jumpgate") as a sort of "secret handshake" to recognize each other online. In 1994, a birthday card for Straczynski was sent around the U.S. to many of the avid posters on the rec.arts.sf.tv.babylon-5 newsgroup. While the card was being circulated, clues were given on the newsgroup, denoted by the symbol <*>, and the jumpgate symbol continued to be used thereafter, even appearing on fan-produced jewelry.

== See also ==
- Babylon 5 influences
