= Babylon 5 =

American space opera television series (1994–1998)

- Genre: Space opera; Drama
- Created by: J. Michael Straczynski
- Starring: Michael O'Hare; Claudia Christian; Jerry Doyle; Mira Furlan; Richard Biggs; Andrea Thompson; Stephen Furst; Bill Mumy; Caitlin Brown; Andreas Katsulas; Peter Jurasik; Bruce Boxleitner; Robert Rusler; Mary Kay Adams; Jason Carter; Jeff Conaway; Patricia Tallman; Tracy Scoggins
- Composers: Christopher Franke; Stewart Copeland (pilot)
- Country of origin: United States
- Original language: English
- No. of seasons: 5
- No. of episodes: 110 (+ 6 TV films) (list of episodes)

Production
- Executive producers: Douglas Netter; J. Michael Straczynski
- Cinematography: John C. Flinn III; (102 episodes, 1994–1998); Fred V. Murphy; (8 episodes, 1995–1998)
- Running time: 43–44 minutes
- Production companies: Babylonian Productions, Inc.; Synthetic Worlds, Ltd. (pilot); Warner Bros. Television

Original release
- Network: PTEN
- Release: February 22, 1993 – October 27, 1997
- Network: TNT
- Release: January 21 – November 25, 1998

Related
- Babylon 5: The Gathering; The Legend of the Rangers; The Lost Tales; Crusade

Babylon 5 is an American space opera television series created by writer and producer J. Michael Straczynski, under the Babylonian Productions label, in association with Straczynski's Synthetic Worlds Ltd. and Warner Bros. Domestic Television. After the successful airing of a test pilot movie on February 22, 1993, Babylon 5: The Gathering, Warner Bros. commissioned the series for production in May 1993 as part of its Prime Time Entertainment Network (PTEN). The show premiered in the United States on January 26, 1994, and ran for five 22-episode seasons.

The series follows the human military staff and alien diplomats stationed on a space station, Babylon 5, built in the aftermath of several major inter-species wars as a neutral ground for galactic diplomacy and trade. Major plotlines included intra-race intrigue and upheaval, inter-race wars and their aftermaths, and embroilment in a millennial cyclic conflict between ancient races. The human characters, in particular, become pivotal to the resistance against Earth's descent into totalitarianism.

Many episodes focused on the effect of wider events on individual characters. Episodes contained themes such as personal change, loss, oppression, corruption, and redemption.

Unusually for American broadcast television at the time of its airing, Babylon 5 was conceived as a "novel for television" with a pre-planned five-year story arc, each episode envisioned as a "chapter". Whereas contemporaneous television shows tended to maintain the overall status quo, confining conflicts to individual episodes, Babylon 5 featured story arcs which spanned multiple episodes and even seasons, effecting permanent changes to the series universe. Tie-in novels, comic books, and short stories were also developed to play a significant canonical part in the overall story.

Straczynski announced plans for a reboot of the series in September 2021 in conjunction with Warner Bros. Television. An animated feature-length, direct-to-video film, Babylon 5: The Road Home, was released in August 2023.

== Setting ==
The main Babylon 5 story arc occurs between the years 2257 and 2262. The show depicts a future where Earth has a unified Earth government and has gained the technology for faster-than-light travel using "jump gates", a kind of wormhole technology allowing transport through the alternate dimension of hyperspace. The Colonies within the Solar System and beyond make up the Earth Alliance, which has established contact with other spacefaring species. Ten years before the series is set, Earth barely escaped destruction by the technologically superior Minbari, who sought revenge after an Earth starship unwittingly killed their leader during first contact, only for them to surrender unexpectedly on the brink of victory. Earth has since established peaceful relationships with them and the Earth Alliance has become a significant and generally respected power within the galactic community.

Among the other species are the imperialist Centauri; the Narn, who only recently gained independence from the Centauri empire; and the mysterious, powerful Vorlons. Several dozen less powerful species from the League of Non-Aligned Worlds also have diplomatic contact with the major races, including the Drazi, Brakiri, Vree, Markab, and pak'ma'ra. An ancient and secretive race, the Shadows, unknown to humans but documented in many other races' religious texts, malevolently influence events to bring chaos and war among the known species. Among the chaos the Shadows cause is a Centauri descent into irredentism and Earth sliding into totalitarianism under President Morgan Clark.

The Babylon 5 space station is located in the Epsilon Eridani system, at the fifth Lagrangian point of the fictional planet Epsilon III and its moon. It is an O'Neill cylinder 5 miles (8.0 km) long and 0.5–1.0 mile (0.80–1.61 km) in diameter. The station is the last of its line; the first three stations were all destroyed during construction, while Babylon 4 was completed but mysteriously vanished shortly after being made operational. It contains living areas which accommodate various alien species, providing differing atmospheres and gravities. Human visitors to the alien sectors are shown using breathing equipment and other measures to tolerate the conditions.

== Cast ==
=== Regular cast ===
Babylon 5 featured an ensemble cast which changed over the course of the show's run:

- Michael O'Hare as Commander (later Ambassador) Jeffrey Sinclair (season 1; guest seasons 2–3): The first commander of Babylon 5, later appointed Earth's ambassador to Minbar.
- Bruce Boxleitner as Captain (later President) John Sheridan (seasons 2–5): Sinclair's replacement on Babylon 5 after his reassignment and a central figure of several prophecies within the Shadow war. Becomes president of the newly formed Interstellar Alliance in season 5.
- Claudia Christian as Lt. Commander (later promoted to Commander) Susan Ivanova (seasons 1–4, guest season 5): Second in command of Babylon 5.
- Jerry Doyle as Michael Garibaldi: Babylon 5's Chief of Security for seasons 1-4; leads the covert intelligence arm of the Interstellar Alliance in season 5.
- Mira Furlan as Delenn: The Minbari ambassador to Babylon 5. Born Minbari, she uses a special artifact at the start of the second season to become a Minbari-human hybrid, and later marries Captain Sheridan.
- Richard Biggs as Doctor Stephen Franklin: Babylon 5's chief medical officer.
- Andrea Thompson as Talia Winters (season 1–2): A commercial Psi-Corps telepath who works aboard the station.
- Stephen Furst as Vir Cotto: Diplomatic aide to Centauri Ambassador Londo Mollari.
- Bill Mumy as Lennier: Diplomatic aide to Minbari Ambassador Delenn.
- Tracy Scoggins as Captain Elizabeth Lochley (season 5): Babylon 5's station commander following Ivanova's departure and Sheridan's resignation.
- Jason Carter as Marcus Cole (seasons 3–4): A Ranger, one of a group of covert agents who fight against the Shadows.
- Caitlin Brown (season 1, guest season 5) and Mary Kay Adams (season 2) as Na'Toth: Diplomatic aide to Narn Ambassador G'Kar.
- Robert Rusler as Warren Keffer (season 2): Commander of the Zeta Wing, one of Babylon 5's small fighter wings.
- Jeff Conaway as Zack Allan (guest season 2, main seasons 3–5): A sergeant in the Babylon 5 security force, replaces Garibaldi as Chief of Security in season 4.
- Patricia Tallman as Lyta Alexander (original TV movie, guest seasons 2–3, main seasons 4–5): A commercial Psi-Corps telepath who takes over for Talia when she leaves the station.
- Andreas Katsulas as G'Kar: The Narn ambassador to Babylon 5.
- Peter Jurasik as Londo Mollari: The Centauri ambassador to Babylon 5.

=== Recurring guests ===
- Wayne Alexander as Lorien: An alien of unknown origin that comes to Sheridan's aid after a critical moment in the Shadow War
- Ardwight Chamberlain (voice) /Jeffery Willerth (in the encounter-suit) as Kosh Naranek, the Vorlon ambassador to Babylon 5
- Tim Choate as Zathras, an alien of unknown origins that is central to the disappearance of Babylon 4
- Josh Coxx as Lt. David Corwin, a technician in Babylon 5's Command and Control center
- David L. Crowley as Ofc. Lou Welch, a member of the Babylon 5 security staff
- Robin Atkin Downes as Byron, a rogue telepath
- William Forward as Lord Antono Refa, a colleague of Ambassador Mollari who has his own designs on the Centauri throne.
- Robert Foxworth as General William Hague, the officer overseeing military operations related to Babylon 5
- Denise Gentile as Lise Hampton, a former romantic interest for Michael Garibaldi during his time on the Mars colony
- Melissa Gilbert as Anna Sheridan, Captain Sheridan's wife. The first appearance of Anna Sheridan was portrayed by Beth Toussaint in a recorded message.
- Lenore Kasdorf as a reporter for the Interstellar News (ISN) network
- Walter Koenig as Alfred Bester, a senior officer of Psi-Corps who considers non-telepaths to be inferior
- Wortham Krimmer as Centauri Emperor Cartagia
- Damian London as Regent Virini, a member of the Centauri court under Emperor Cartagia
- Leigh McCloskey as Thomas
- Marjorie Monaghan as Number One / Tessa Holloran, the leader of the Mars resistance
- Julia Nickson-Soul as Catherine Sakai, a commercial explorer and Commander Sinclair's love interest
- Jim Norton as Ombuds Wellington, a judge aboard Babylon 5. Norton also played a projection of G'Kars father in "Dust to Dust" and Dr. Lazarenn, a Markab doctor, in "Confessions and Lamentations"
- John Schuck as Draal (younger), Delenn's teacher and friend from Minbar that becomes part of the Great Machine buried within Epsilon III
- Louis Turenne as Brother Theo, the leader of a group of Roman Catholic monks living aboard Babylon 5.
- John Vickery as Neroon, a member of the Minbari warrior caste that replaced Delenn on the Grey Council following her transformation
- Ed Wasser as Morden, a human agent working for the Shadows
- Efrem Zimbalist Jr. as William Edgars, a wealthy businessman who controls much of the economy in the Mars colony

In addition, several other actors filled more than one minor role on the series. Kim Strauss played the Drazi Ambassador in four episodes, as well as nine other characters in ten more episodes. Some actors had difficulty dealing with the application of prosthetics required to play some of the alien characters. The producers therefore used the same group of people (as many as 12) in various mid-level speaking roles, taking full head and body casts from each. The group came to be unofficially known by the production as the "Babylon 5 Alien Rep Group."

== Synopsis ==
Season	Episodes	Originally released		
Season	Episodes	First released	Last released	Network
Pilot	1	February 22, 1993		PTEN
1	22	January 26, 1994	October 3, 1994	PTEN
2	22	November 2, 1994	August 15, 1995	PTEN
3	22	November 6, 1995	September 22, 1996	PTEN
4	22	November 4, 1996	October 27, 1997	PTEN
5	22	January 21, 1998	November 25, 1998	TNT

The five seasons of the series each correspond to one fictional sequential year in the period 2258–2262. Each season shares its title with an episode that is central to that season's plot.

=== Pilot film (1993) ===
In the pilot film, Babylon 5: The Gathering, the Vorlon ambassador Kosh is nearly killed by an assassin shortly after arriving at the station. Jeffrey Sinclair, the commander of Babylon 5, is named as the prime suspect, but is proven to have been framed.

=== Season 1: Signs and Portents (1994) ===
Commander Sinclair, a hero of the Minbari war, is troubled by his inability to remember events of the war's last day. Though supported by Minbari ambassador Delenn, who is secretly a member of the Minbari ruling Grey Council, other Minbari remain distrustful of him. The Narn ambassador G'Kar continually presses for concessions from the Narns' former overlords the Centauri Republic. Centauri ambassador Londo Mollari finds a new ally in the enigmatic Mr. Morden to strike back at the Narn. Meanwhile, xenophobic groups on Earth challenge humanity's tolerance of aliens. This tension culminates in the assassination of Earth's President Santiago, who favored such contact.

=== Season 2: The Coming of Shadows (1994–1995) ===
Sinclair is transferred to be ambassador to Minbar, and General Hague assigns captain John Sheridan command of the station. Hague and Sheridan believe now-president Clark conspired in Santiago's death but have no proof. Clark gradually moves Earth in an isolationist direction and takes steps to install a totalitarian government. When the aging Centauri Emperor Turhan dies, Mollari and his ally Lord Refa install Turhan's unstable nephew Cartagia as emperor and force a war against the Narn. Aided by Mr. Morden's "associates" the Shadows, the Centauri decimate the Narn. The war ends with a planetary bombardment of the Narn homeworld, followed by the enslavement of the surviving Narns. Delenn and Vorlon ambassador Kosh request Sheridan's help to fight against their ancient foe, the Shadows.

=== Season 3: Point of No Return (1995–1996) ===
Sheridan and Delenn establish a "conspiracy of light" to fight the influence of the Shadows. When Clark declares martial law, Sheridan declares Babylon 5's independence from the Earth government. Mollari realizes his deal with Mr. Morden has become dangerous but is unable to end it. As the Shadows cause conflict and chaos throughout the galaxy, Sheridan confronts Kosh and successfully convinces the Vorlons to provide military assistance against them. In retaliation for Vorlon intervention, the Shadows assassinate Kosh. Sinclair travels back in time a thousand years to aid the Minbari in the previous Shadow War, becoming the legendary Minbari religious leader Valen. Sheridan discovers vulnerabilities in the Shadow vessels and learns to predict their objectives, leading to the first major military defeat of the Shadows. Despite Kosh's warnings, Sheridan confronts the Shadows on their homeworld Z'ha'dum. He crashes a spacecraft packed with nuclear weapons into the planet, seemingly dying in the explosion.

=== Season 4: No Surrender, No Retreat (1996–1997) ===
Sheridan is rescued from Z'ha'dum by the mysterious Lorien. With the Shadows in retreat, the Vorlons begin destroying any planet allied with or influenced by the Shadows. Mollari overthrows the mad emperor Cartagia with the aid of G'Kar in exchange for the liberation of the Narn from Centauri rule. Mollari betrays the Shadows in order to save the Centauri homeworld from the Vorlons. Sheridan realizes the Vorlons and Shadows have used the younger races in a proxy war, and convinces both sides to permanently end their conflict and to leave the younger races alone in peace. Sheridan next refocuses on returning democracy to Earth. He forges a new Interstellar Alliance along with the Minbari, Centauri, and Narn governments. With their help, Sheridan is able to win the Earth civil war and forces President Clark out of office. Sheridan is forced to resign from the Earth military, but is named president of the Interstellar Alliance.

=== Season 5: The Wheel of Fire (1998) ===
An ex-wife of Sheridan's, Elizabeth Lochley, is assigned to command the station. A group of rogue human telepaths take sanctuary on the station, seeking Sheridan's aid to escape the control of Psi Corps, the autocratic Earth agency that oversees telepaths. The Interstellar Alliance refuses to grant them a planet of their own, and they are eventually expelled from the station. Meanwhile, the Drakh, former supporters of the Shadows, seek revenge for the Shadows' defeat. They infiltrate the Centauri government and orchestrate attacks against other Alliance members. Mollari attempts to purge the alien manipulation of his government but is too late. After a devastating attack by Alliance forces on Centauri Prime, Mollari is installed as emperor, but under Drakh control. He then withdraws the Centauri from the Interstellar Alliance. Twenty years later, Sheridan has a last reunion with his friends before leaving to join Lorien and the older races "beyond the rim".

=== Spin-offs and television movies ===
The original show spawned a multimedia franchise of spin-offs consisting of a miniseries, five television movies, twenty-two novels, two tabletop games (an RPG and a wargame), and various other media such as technical books, comics, and trading cards.

== Production ==
=== Origin ===
Having worked on a number of television science fiction shows which had regularly gone over budget, Straczynski concluded that a lack of long-term planning was to blame, and set about looking at ways in which a series could be done responsibly. Taking note of the lessons of mainstream television, which brought stories to a centralized location such as a hospital, police station, or law office, he decided that instead of "[going] in search of new worlds, building them anew each week", a fixed space station setting would keep costs at a reasonable level. A fan of sagas such as the Foundation series, Childhood's End, The Lord of the Rings, Dune and the Lensman series, Straczynski wondered why no one had done a television series with the same epic sweep, and concurrently with the first idea started developing the concept for a vastly ambitious epic covering massive battles and other universe-changing events. Realizing that both the fixed-locale series and the epic could be done in a single series, he began to sketch the initial outline of what would become Babylon 5.

Once I had the locale, I began to populate it with characters, and sketch out directions that might be interesting. I dragged out my notes on religion, philosophy, history, sociology, psychology, science (the ones that didn't make my head explode), and started stitching together a crazy quilt pattern that eventually formed a picture. Once I had that picture in my head, once I knew what the major theme was, the rest fell into place. All at once, I saw the full five-year story in a flash, and I frantically began scribbling down notes.

— J. Michael Straczynski, 1995

Straczynski set five goals for Babylon 5. He said that the show "would have to be good science fiction". It would also have to be good television, "and rarely are SF shows both good SF *and* good TV; there're [sic] generally one or the other." It would have to do for science fiction television what Hill Street Blues had done for police dramas, by taking an adult approach to the subject. It would have to be reasonably budgeted, and "it would have to look unlike anything ever seen before on TV, presenting individual stories against a much broader canvas." He further stressed that his approach was "to take [science fiction] seriously, to build characters for grown-ups, to incorporate real science but keep the characters at the center of the story." Some of the staples of television science fiction were also out of the question (the show would have "no kids or cute robots"). The idea was not to present a perfect utopian future, but one with greed and homelessness; one where characters grow, develop, live, and die; one where not everything was the same at the end of the day's events. Citing Mark Twain as an influence, Straczynski said he wanted the show to be a mirror to the real world and to covertly teach.

Following production on Captain Power and the Soldiers of the Future, Straczynski approached John Copeland and Doug Netter, who had also been involved with Captain Power and showed him the bible and pilot script for his show, and both were impressed with his ideas. They were able to secure an order for the pilot from Warner Bros. who were looking at the time to get programming for a planned broadcast network. Warner Bros. had remained skeptical about the show even after greenlighting the pilot. According to Straczynski, Warner Bros. had three main concerns: that American attention spans were too short for a series-long narrative to work, that it would be difficult to sell the show into syndication as the syndicate networks would air the episodes out of order, and that no other science-fiction television show outside of Star Trek had gone more than three seasons before being canceled. Straczynski had proved out that the syndication fear was incorrect, since syndicate stations told him they show their shows in episode order to track broadcasts for royalties; however, he could not assure Warner Bros. about the attention span or premature cancellation concerns, but still set out to show Warner Bros. they were wrong.

=== Writing ===
Straczynski wrote 92 of the 110 episodes of Babylon 5, including all 44 episodes in the third and fourth seasons, a feat never before accomplished in American television. Other writers to have contributed scripts to the show include Peter David, Neil Gaiman, Kathryn M. Drennan, Lawrence G. DiTillio, D. C. Fontana, and David Gerrold. Harlan Ellison, a creative consultant on the show, received story credits for two episodes. Each writer was informed of the overarching storyline, enabling the show to be produced consistently under-budget. The rules of production were strict; scripts were written six episodes in advance, and changes could not be made once production had started.

With not all cast members being hired for every episode of a season, the five-year plot length caused some planning difficulties. If a critical scene involving an actor not hired for every episode had to be moved, that actor had to be paid for work on an extra episode. It was sometimes necessary to adjust the plotline to accommodate external influences, an example being the "trap door" that was written for every character: in the event of that actor's unexpected departure from the series, the character could be written out with minimal impact on the storyline. Straczynski stated, "As a writer, doing a long-term story, it'd be dangerous and short-sighted for me to construct the story without trap doors for every single character. ... That was one of the big risks going into a long-term storyline which I considered long in advance;..." This device was eventually used to facilitate the departures of Claudia Christian and Andrea Thompson from the series.

First thing I did was to flip out the stand-alones, which traditionally have taken up the first 6 or so episodes of each season; between two years, that's 12 episodes, over half a season right there. Then you would usually get a fair number of additional stand-alones scattered across the course of the season. So figure another 3–4 per season, say 8, that's 20 out of 44. So now you're left with basically 24 episodes to fill out the main arc of the story.

— J. Michael Straczynski, 1996

Straczynski purposely went light on elements of the five-year narrative during the first season as he felt the audience would not be ready for the full narrative at that time, but he still managed to drop in some scenes that would be critical to the future narrative. This also made it challenging for the actors to understand their motivations without knowing where their characters were going; Straczynski said "I didn't want to tell them too much, because that risks having them play the result, rather than the process." He recalled that Peter Jurasik had asked him about the context of Londo's premonition, shown partially in "Midnight on the Firing Line", of himself and G'Kar choking each other to death, but Straczynski had to be coy about it. The full death scene was shown in context in "War Without End - Part 2" near the end of the third season.

During production of the fourth season, the Prime Time Entertainment Network, which Warner Bros. opted to use for Babylon 5, was shut down, leaving the planned fifth season in doubt. Unwilling to short-change fans of the show, Straczynski began preparing modifications to the fourth season that would allow him to conclude his overall arc should a fifth season not be greenlit, which ultimately became the direction the fourth season took. Straczynski identified three primary narrative threads which would require resolution: the Shadow war, Earth's slide into a dictatorship, and a series of sub-threads which branched off from those. Estimating they would still take around 27 episodes to resolve without having the season feel rushed, the solution came when the TNT network commissioned two Babylon 5 television films. Several hours of material was thus able to be moved into the films, including a three-episode arc which would deal with the background to the Earth–Minbari War, and a sub-thread which would have set up the sequel series, Crusade. Further standalone episodes and plot-threads were dropped from season four, which could be inserted into Crusade, or the fifth season, were it to be given the greenlight. The intended series finale, "Sleeping in Light", was filmed during season four as a precaution against cancellation. When word came that TNT had picked up Babylon 5, this was moved to the end of season five and replaced with a newly filmed season four finale, "The Deconstruction of Falling Stars".

=== Costume ===
Ann Bruice Aling was costume designer for the show, after production designer John Iacovelli suggested her for the position, having previously worked with her on a number of film and theatrical productions.

With the variety of costumes required she compared Babylon 5 to "eclectic theatre", with fewer rules about period, line, shape and textures having to be adhered to. Preferring natural materials whenever possible, such as ostrich leather in the Narn body armor, Bruice combined and layered fabrics as diverse as rayon and silk with brocades from the 1930s and '40s to give the clothing the appearance of having evolved within different cultures.

Often we try to coordinate the sensibilities of the aliens. I try to work with Optic Nerve to ensure that the head meets the body in some sensible way. We talk about similar qualities, textures and colors and the flow of the total being. Truthfully, often the look of the prosthetic comes somewhat earlier and from that I have an understanding of what direction to go.

— Ann Bruice Aling, 1995

With an interest in costume history, she initially worked closely with Straczynski to get a sense of the historical perspective of the major alien races, "so I knew if they were a peaceful people or a warring people, cold climate etc. and then I would interpret what kind of sensibility that called for." Collaborating with other departments to establish co-ordinated visual themes for each race, a broad palette of colors was developed with Iacovelli, which he referred to as "spicy brights". These warm shades of gray and secondary colors, such as certain blues for the Minbari, would often be included when designing both the costumes and relevant sets. As the main characters evolved, Bruice referred back to Straczynski and producer John Copeland who she viewed as "surprisingly more accessible to me as advisors than other producers and directors", so the costumes could reflect these changes. Ambassador Londo Mollari's purple coat became dark blue and more tailored while his waistcoats became less patterned and brightly colored as Bruice felt "Londo has evolved in my mind from a buffoonish character to one who has become more serious and darker."

Normally there were three changes of costume for the primary actors; one for on set, one for the stunt double and one on standby in case of "coffee spills". For human civilians, garments were generally purchased off-the-rack and altered in various ways, such as removing lapels from jackets and shirts while rearranging closures, to suggest future fashions. For some of the main female characters a more couture approach was taken, as in the suits worn by Talia Winters, which Bruice described as being designed and fitted to within "an inch of their life". Costumes for the destitute residents of downbelow would be distressed through a combination of bleaching, sanding, dipping in dye baths and having stage blood added.

Like many of the crew on the show, members of the costume department made onscreen cameos. During the season 4 episode "Atonement", the tailors and costume supervisor appeared as the Minbari women fitting Zack Allan for his new uniform as the recently promoted head of security. His complaints, and the subsequent stabbing of him with a needle by costume supervisor Kim Holly, was a light-hearted reference to the previous security uniforms, a design carried over from the pilot movie, which was difficult to work with and wear due to the combination of leather and wool.

=== Prosthetic makeup and animatronics ===
While the original pilot film featured some aliens which were puppets and animatronics, the decision was made early on in the show's production to portray most alien species as humanoid in appearance. Barring isolated appearances, fully computer-generated aliens were discounted as an idea due to the "massive rendering power" required. Long-term use of puppets and animatronics was also discounted, as Straczynski believed they would not be able to convey "real emotion" without an actor inside.

=== Visuals ===
In anticipation of the emerging HDTV standard, rather than the usual 4:3 format, the series was shot in 16:9, with the image cropped to 4:3 for initial television transmissions. It was one of the first television shows to use computer technology in creating visual effects, rather than models and miniatures, primarily out of budgetary concerns; Straczynski estimated that each of their episodes cost US$650,000 to make, compared to the US$1.5 million cost of each episode of Star Trek: The Next Generation. The visual effects were achieved using Amiga-based Video Toasters at first, and later Pentium, Macintosh, and Alpha-based systems using LightWave 3D. The effects sequences were designed to simulate Newtonian physics, with particular emphasis on the effects of inertia on the motion of spacecraft.

Foundation Imaging provided the special effects for the pilot film (for which it won an Emmy) and the first three seasons of the show, led by Ron Thornton. After co-executive producer Douglas Netter and producer John Copeland approached Straczynski with the idea of producing the effects in-house, Straczynski agreed to replace Foundation, for season 4 and 5, once a new team had been established by Netter Digital, and an equal level of quality was assured, by using similar technology and a number of former Foundation employees. The Emmy-winning alien make-up was provided by Optic Nerve Studios.

=== Music and scoring ===
Sleeping in Light

Soundtrack album by Christopher Franke
- Released: March 23, 1999
- Genres: Classical, electroacoustic
- Length: 25:01
- Label: Sonic Images

Professional ratings
Review scores
Source	Rating
AllMusic	4/5 stars

Christopher Franke composed and scored the musical soundtrack for all five years of the show when Stewart Copeland, who worked on the original telefilm, was unable to return for the first season due to recording and touring commitments.

Initially concerned composing for an episodic television show could become "annoying because of the repetition", Franke found the evolving characters and story of Babylon 5 afforded him the opportunity to continually take new directions. Given creative freedom by the producers, Franke also orchestrated and mixed all the music, which one reviewer described as having "added another dimension of mystery, suspense, and excitement to the show, with an easily distinguishable character that separates 'Babylon 5 from other sci-fi television entries of the era."

With his recording studio in the same building as his home located in the Hollywood Hills, Franke would attend creative meetings before scoring the 25 minutes or so of music for each episode. Using the "acoustic dirt produced by live instruments and the ability to play so well between two semitones" and the "frequency range, dynamics and control" provided by synthesizers, he described his approach "as experimental friendly as possible without leaving the happy marriage between the orchestral and electronic sounds".

Using Cubase software through an electronic keyboard, or for more complex pieces a light pen and graphics tablet, he would begin by developing the melodic content round which the ambient components and transitions were added. Using playbacks with digital samples of the appropriate instruments, such as a group of violins, he would decide which tracks to produce electronically or record acoustically.

Scores for the acoustic tracks were emailed to his Berlin scoring stage, and would require from four musicians to the full orchestra, with a maximum of 24 present at any one time. One of three conductors would also be required for any score that involved more than six musicians. Franke would direct recording sessions via six fiber optic digital telephone lines to transmit and receive video, music and the SMPTE timecode. The final edit and mixing of the tracks would take place in his Los Angeles studio.

A total of 24 episode and three television film soundtracks were released under Franke's record label, Sonic Images Records, between 1995 and 2001. These contain the musical scores in the same chronological order as they played in the corresponding episodes, or television films. Three compilation albums were also produced, containing extensively re-orchestrated and remixed musical passages taken from throughout the series to create more elaborate suites. In 2007, his soundtrack for The Lost Tales was released under the Varèse Sarabande record label.

Music CD Releases
Episodic soundtracks	Tracks	Running time	Release date	Catalog No.
Severed Dreams	5	33:15	September 16, 1997	SID-0310
A Late Delivery From Avalon	6	26:37	September 16, 1997	SID-0312
Walkabout	6	28:58	September 16, 1997	SID-0318
Shadow Dancing	6	33:50	September 16, 1997	SID-0321
Z'Ha'Dum	6	36:23	September 16, 1997	SID-0322
The Fall of Night	6	22:45	April 14, 1998	SID-0222
Interludes and Examinations	6	30:14	April 14, 1998	SID-0315
Into The Fire	6	35:05	April 14, 1998	SID-0406
No Surrender, No Retreat	6	30:53	April 14, 1998	SID-0415
The Face of the Enemy	6	32:20	April 14, 1998	SID-0417
The Ragged Edge	6	22:42	April 14, 1998	SID-0513
Chrysalis	6	24:51	August 11, 1998	SID-0112
The Coming of Shadows	6	26:00	August 11, 1998	SID-0209
War Without End, Part 1	6	32:04	August 11, 1998	SID-0316
War Without End, Part 2	6	32:41	August 11, 1998	SID-0317
Whatever Happened To Mr. Garibaldi	6	28:41	August 11, 1998	SID-0402
The Long Night	6	24:32	August 11, 1998	SID-0405
Lines of Communication	6	31:44	August 11, 1998	SID-0411
Endgame	6	35:25	August 11, 1998	SID-0420
Falling Toward Apotheosis	6	23:03	February 16, 1999	SID-0404
Darkness Ascending	6	32:41	February 16, 1999	SID-0516
Objects at Rest	6	27:52	February 16, 1999	SID-0522
Sleeping in Light	6	24:40	February 16, 1999	SID-0523
And The Rock Cried Out, No Hiding Place	6	27:59	January 9, 2001	SID-0320
Movie Soundtracks
In The Beginning	6	57:12	August 11, 1998	SID-8812
Thirdspace	5	59:22	January 12, 1999	SID-8900
The River of Souls	6	49:55	May 18, 1999	SID-8907
The Lost Tales (released by Varèse Sarabande)	28	39:39	July 24, 2007	VSD-6829
Extended Compilations
Babylon 5 Vol.1 – Babylon 5 Suites	6	58:03	April 11, 1995	SID-6502
Babylon 5 Vol.2 – Messages from Earth	6	57:03	February 11, 1997	SID-6602
The Best of Babylon 5	6	50:02	January 9, 2001	SID-8931

=== Broadcast history ===
Warner Bros. slotted the show to premiere on its nascent Prime Time Entertainment Network (PTEN). As original content from another studio, it was somewhat anomalous in a stable of syndicated content from Warner Bros. and the cause of some friction between Straczynski's company and Warner Bros.

The pilot film, The Gathering, premiered on February 22, 1993, with strong viewing figures, achieving a 9.7 in the Nielsen national syndication rankings. The regular series initially aired from January 26, 1994 through November 25, 1998, first on PTEN, then in first-run syndication, debuting with a 6.8 rating/10 share. Figures dipped in its second week, and while it posted a solid 5.0 rating/8 share, with an increase in several major markets, ratings for the first season continued to fall, to a low of 3.4 during reruns. Ratings remained low-to-middling throughout the first four seasons, but Babylon 5 scored well with the demographics required to attract the leading national sponsors and saved up to $300,000 per episode by shooting off the studio lot, therefore remaining profitable. The fifth season, which aired on cable network TNT, had ratings about 1.0% lower than seasons two through four.

In the United Kingdom, the show aired every week on Channel 4 without a break, with the result that the last four or five episodes of the early seasons screened in the UK before the US. Babylon 5 was one of the better-rated US television shows on Channel 4, and achieved high audience Appreciation Indexes, with the season 4 episode "Endgame" achieving the rare feat of beating the prime-time soap operas for first position.

Straczynski stated that PTEN only required the show to be profitable for the network to remain in production, and said that while this was the case for its first four seasons, on paper it was always losing money; he also remarked in a 2019 interview that in terms of contractual profit definition the show remained about US$30 million in the red on paper, and stated that he had therefore never made any profits on Babylon 5. The entire series cost an estimated $90 million for 110 episodes.

Babylon 5 completed its five-year story arc on November 25, 1998, after five seasons and 109 aired episodes, when TNT aired the 110th (epilogue) episode "Sleeping in Light," which had been filmed as the Season 4 finale, when Babylon 5 was under threat of being cut. After a fifth season was assured, a new Season 4 finale was used so that "Sleeping in Light" could remain as the series finale.

=== Remastered version ===
In November 2020, a remastered version of the show in 4:3 format was released to the iTunes Store and Amazon Prime Video. This version uses the original negatives for filmed elements, and algorithmically upscales the digitally created elements to HD resolution with fewer visual artifacts, for a more visually consistent presentation. In January 2021, it was made available for streaming on HBO Max. In February 2023, HBO's license expired and streaming rights were acquired by the free streaming service Tubi.

== Themes ==
Throughout its run, Babylon 5 found ways to portray themes relevant to modern and historical social issues. It marked several firsts in television science fiction, including the exploration of the political and social landscapes of the first human colonies, their interactions with Earth, and the underlying tensions. Babylon 5 was also one of the first television science fiction shows to denotatively refer to a same-sex relationship. In the show, sexual orientation is as much of an issue as "being left-handed or right-handed". Unrequited love is explored as a source of pain for the characters, though not all the relationships end unhappily.

=== Order vs. chaos; authoritarianism vs. free will ===
Neither the Vorlons nor the Shadows saw themselves as conquerors or adversaries. Both believed they were doing what was right for us. And like any possessive parent, they'll keep on believing that until the kid is strong enough to stand up and say, 'No, this is what I want.'

— J. Michael Straczynski, 1997

The clash between order and chaos, and the people caught in between, plays an important role in Babylon 5. The conflict between two unimaginably powerful older races, the Vorlons and the Shadows, is represented as a battle between competing ideologies, each seeking to turn the humans and the other younger races to their beliefs. The Vorlons represent an authoritarian philosophy of unquestioning obedience. Vorlon characters frequently ask, "who are you?" focusing on identity as a catalyst for shaping personal goals; the intention is not to solicit a correct answer, but to "tear down the artifices we construct around ourselves until we're left facing ourselves, not our roles." The Shadows represent another authoritarian philosophy cloaked in a disguise of evolution through fire, of fomenting conflict in order to promote evolutionary progress. Characters affiliated with the Shadows repeatedly ask, "what do you want?" emphasising personal desire and ambition, using it to shape identity, encouraging conflict between groups who choose to serve their own glory or profit. The representation of order and chaos was informed by the Babylonian myth that the universe was born in the conflict between both. The climax of this conflict comes with the younger races' exposing of the Vorlons' and the Shadows' "true faces" and the rejection of both philosophies, heralding the dawn of a new age without their interference.

The notion that the war was about "killing your parents" is echoed in the portrayal of the civil war between the human colonies and Earth. Deliberately dealing in historical and political metaphor, with particular emphasis upon McCarthyism and the HUAC, the Earth Alliance becomes increasingly authoritarian, eventually sliding into a dictatorship. The show examines the impositions on civil liberties under the pretext of greater defense against outside threats which aid its rise, and the self-delusion of a populace which believes its moral superiority will never allow a dictatorship to come to power, until it is too late. The successful rebellion led by the Babylon 5 station results in the restoration of a democratic government and true autonomy for Mars and the colonies.

=== War and peace ===
What interests me, what I wanted to do with making this show, was in large measure to examine the issues and emotions and events that precede a war, precipitate a war, the effects of the war itself, the end of the war and the aftermath of the war. The war is hardware; the people are at the center of the story.

— J. Michael Straczynski, 1997

The Babylon 5 universe portrays numerous armed conflicts on an interstellar scale, including the Dilgar war, Narn-Centauri conflict, Minbari civil war, Drakh War, Interstellar Alliance-Centauri war, and the Great Burn. The story begins in the aftermath of a war which brought the human race to the brink of extinction, caused by a misunderstanding during a first contact with the Minbari. Babylon 5 is built to foster peace through diplomacy, described as the "last, best hope for peace" in the opening credits monologue during its first three seasons. Wars between separate alien civilizations are featured. The conflict between the Narn and the Centauri is followed from its beginnings as a minor territorial dispute amplified by historical animosity, through to its end, in which weapons of mass destruction are employed to subjugate and enslave a planet. The war is an attempt to portray a more sobering kind of conflict than usually seen on science fiction television. Informed by the events of the first Gulf War, the Cuban Missile Crisis and the Soviet invasion of Prague, the intent was to recreate these moments when "the world held its breath" and the emotional core of the conflict was the disbelief that the situation could have occurred at all, and the desperation to find a way to bring it to an end. By the start of the third season, the opening monolog had changed to say that the hope for peace had "failed" and the Babylon 5 station had become the "last, best hope for victory", indicating that while peace is ostensibly a laudable goal, it can also mean a capitulation to an enemy intent on committing horrendous acts and that "peace is a byproduct of victory against those who do not want peace."

The Shadow War also features prominently in the show, wherein the Shadows work to instigate conflict between other races to promote technological and cultural advancement, opposed by the Vorlons who are attempting to impose their own authoritarian philosophy of obedience. The gradual discovery of the scheme and the rebellion against it underpin the first three seasons, but also as a wider metaphor for competing forces of order and chaos. In that respect, Straczynski stated he presented Earth's descent into a dictatorship as its own "shadow war". In ending the Shadow War before the conclusion of the series, the show was able to more fully explore its aftermath, and it is this "war at home" which forms the bulk of the remaining two seasons. The struggle for independence between Mars and Earth culminates with a civil war between the human colonies (led by the Babylon 5 station) and the home planet. Choosing Mars as both the spark for the civil war, and the staging ground for its dramatic conclusion, enabled the viewer to understand the conflict more fully than had it involved an anonymous colony orbiting a distant star. The conflict, and the reasons behind it, were informed by Nazism, McCarthyism and the breakup of Yugoslavia, and the destruction of the state also served as partial inspiration for the Minbari civil war.

The post-war landscape has its roots in the Reconstruction. The attempt to resolve the issues of the American Civil War after the conflict had ended, and this struggle for survival in a changed world was also informed by works such as Alas, Babylon, a novel dealing with the after-effects of a nuclear war on a small American town. The show expresses that the end of these wars is not an end to war itself. Events shown hundreds of years into the show's future tell of wars which will once again bring the human race to the edge of annihilation, demonstrating that humanity will not change, and the best that can be hoped for after it falls is that it climbs a little higher each time, until it can one day "take [its] place among the stars, teaching those who follow."

=== Religion ===
If you look at the long history of human society, religion – whether you describe that as organized, disorganized, or the various degrees of accepted superstition – has always been present. And it will be present 200 years from now... To totally ignore that part of the human equation would be as false and wrong-headed as ignoring the fact that people get mad, or passionate, or strive for better lives.

— J. Michael Straczynski, 1993

Many of Earth's contemporary religions are shown to still exist, with the main human characters often having religious convictions. Among those specifically identified are the Roman Catholic branch of Christianity (including the Jesuits), Judaism, and the fictional Foundationism (which developed after first contact with alien races). Alien beliefs in the show range from the Centauri's Bacchanalian-influenced religions, of which there are up to seventy different denominations, to the more pantheistic as with the Narn and Minbari religions. In the show's third season, a community of Cistercian monks takes up residence on the Babylon 5 station, in order to learn what other races call God, and to come to a better understanding of the different religions through study at close quarters.

References to both human and alien religion is often subtle and brief, but can also form the main theme of an episode. The first-season episode "The Parliament of Dreams" is a conventional "showcase" for religion, in which each species on the Babylon 5 station has an opportunity to demonstrate its beliefs (humanity's are presented as being numerous and varied), while "Passing Through Gethsemane" focuses on a specific position of Roman Catholic beliefs, as well as concepts of justice, vengeance, and biblical forgiveness. Other treatments have been more contentious, such as the David Gerrold-scripted "Believers", in which alien parents would rather see their son die than undergo a life-saving operation because their religious beliefs forbid it.

When religion is an integral part of an episode, various characters express differing view points. In the episode "Soul Hunter", where the concept of an immortal soul is touched upon, and whether after death it is destroyed, reincarnated, or simply does not exist. The character arguing the latter, Doctor Stephen Franklin, often appears in the more spiritual storylines as his scientific rationality is used to create dramatic conflict. Undercurrents of religions such as Buddhism have been viewed by some in various episode scripts, and while identifying himself as an atheist, Straczynski believes that passages of dialog can take on distinct meanings to viewers of differing faiths, and that the show ultimately expresses ideas which cross religious boundaries.

=== Addiction ===
Substance abuse and its impact on human personalities also features in the Babylon 5 storyline. Garibaldi is a relapsing-remitting alcoholic, who practices complete abstinence throughout most of the series until the middle of season five, only recovering at the end of the season. Zack Allan, his eventual replacement as chief of security, was given a second chance by Garibaldi after overcoming his own addiction to an unspecified drug. Dr. Stephen Franklin develops an addiction to injectable stimulant drugs while trying to cope with the chronic stress and work overload in Medlab, and he takes a leave of absence from his position to recover. Executive Officer Susan Ivanova mentions that her father became an alcoholic after her mother's suicide. Captain Elizabeth Lochley tells Garibaldi that her father was an alcoholic, and that she is a recovering alcoholic herself.

== Influences ==
Babylon 5 draws upon a number of cultural, historical, political and religious influences to inform and illustrate its characters and storylines. Straczynski has stated that there was no intent to wholly represent any particular period of history or preceding work of fiction, but has acknowledged their influence on the series, inasmuch as it uses similar well established storytelling structures, such as the hero's journey.

There are a number of specific literary references. Several episodes take their titles from Shakespearean monologs, and at least one character quotes Shakespeare directly. The Psi-Cop Alfred Bester was named after the science fiction author of the same name, as his work influenced the autocratic Psi Corps organization the character represents.

There are a number of references to the legend of King Arthur, with ships named Excalibur appearing in the main series and the Crusade spin-off, and a character in "A Late Delivery from Avalon" claiming to possess the sword itself. Straczynski links the incident which sparked the Earth–Minbari war, in which actions are misinterpreted during a tense situation, to a sequence in Le Morte d'Arthur, in which a standoff between two armies turns violent when innocent actions are misinterpreted as hostile.

The series also quotes contemporary and ancient history. The Centauri are in part modeled on the Roman empire. Emperor Cartagia believes himself to be a god, a deliberate reference to Caligula. His eventual assassination leads to the ascension of Londo and eventually Vir, both unlikely candidates for the throne, similar to Claudius' improbable ascension after Caligula was assassinated. The series alludes to the novel I, Claudius by Robert Graves when Cartagia jokes that he has cured a man of his cough by having him beheaded, something also done by Caligula. In the episode "In the Shadow of Z'ha'dhum," Sheridan ponders Winston Churchill's Coventry dilemma, of whether or not to act on covertly gathered intelligence during a war. Lives would be saved, but at the risk of revealing to the enemy that their intentions are known, which may be far more damaging in the long term. The swearing in of Vice President Morgan Clark invokes the assassination of President John F. Kennedy, being deliberately staged to mirror the scene aboard Air Force One when Lyndon Johnson was sworn in as President.

Several episodes have titles referring to Biblical and/or Christian traditional narratives or texts, such as "Passing Through Gethsemane", "A Voice in the Wilderness," and "And the Rock Cried Out, No Hiding Place," the latter being a line from the gospel song "There's no Hiding Place Down Here."

== Use of the Internet ==
The show employed Internet marketing to create a buzz among online readers far in advance of the airing of the pilot episode, with Straczynski participating in online communities on USENET (in the rec.arts.sf.tv.babylon5.moderated newsgroup), and the GEnie and CompuServe systems before the Web came together as it exists today. The station's location, in "grid epsilon" at coordinates of 470/18/22, was a reference to GEnie ("grid epsilon" = "GE") and the original forum's address on the system's bulletin boards (page 470, category 18, topic 22).

Also during this time, Warner Bros. executive Jim Moloshok created and distributed electronic trading cards to help advertise the series. In 1995, Warner Bros. started the Official Babylon 5 Website on the now defunct Pathfinder portal. In September 1995, they hired series fan Troy Rutter to take over the site and move it to its own domain name, and to oversee the Keyword B5 area on America Online.

== Reception ==
In 2004 and 2007, TV Guide ranked Babylon 5 #13 and #16 on its list of the top cult shows ever.

=== Awards ===
Awards presented to Babylon 5 include:

- Emmy Award: Outstanding Individual Achievement in Special Visual Effects, 1993 (The Gathering)
- Emmy Award: Outstanding Individual Achievement in Makeup for a Series , 1994 (episode, "The Parliament of Dreams")
- Hugo Award: Best Dramatic Presentation, 1996 (episode, "The Coming of Shadows")
- Hugo Award: Best Dramatic Presentation, 1997 (episode, "Severed Dreams")
- Saturn Award: Best Syndicated/Cable Television Series, 1998
- Space Frontier Foundation Award: Vision of the Future, 1994
- Space Frontier Foundation Award: Vision of the Future, 1996
- E Pluribus Unum Award: (Presented By American Cinema Association), 1997
- Nebula Award Outstanding Dramatic Presentation, 1998.

Nominated Awards include:

- Emmy Award: Outstanding Individual Achievement in Makeup for a Series, 1995 (episode, "Acts of Sacrifice")
- Emmy Award: Outstanding Individual Achievement in Hairstyling for a Series, 1995 (episode, "The Geometry of Shadows")
- Emmy Award: Outstanding Individual Achievement in Cinematography for a Series, 1995 (episode, "The Geometry Of Shadows")
- Emmy Award: Outstanding Cinematography for a Series, 1996
- Emmy Award: Outstanding Makeup for a Series, 1997 (episode, "The Summoning")
- Emmy Award: Outstanding Makeup for a Series, 1998 (television movie, In The Beginning)

=== Star Trek: Deep Space Nine and Paramount plagiarism controversy ===
Straczynski indicated that Paramount Television was aware of his concept as early as 1989, when he attempted to sell the show to the studio, and provided them with the series bible, pilot script, artwork, lengthy character background histories, and plot synopses for "22 or so" planned episodes taken from the overall course of the planned series.

Paramount declined to produce Babylon 5, but later announced Star Trek: Deep Space Nine was in development, two months after Warner Bros. announced its plans for Babylon 5. Unlike previous Star Trek shows, Deep Space Nine was based on a space station, and had themes similar to those of Babylon 5, which drew some to compare it with Babylon 5. Straczynski stated that, even though he was confident that Deep Space Nine showrunners Rick Berman and Michael Piller had not seen the material, he suspected that Paramount executives used his bible and scripts to steer development of Deep Space Nine. Straczynski and Warner did not file suit against Paramount, largely because he believed it would negatively affect both series. He argued the same when confronted by claims that the lack of legal action was proof that his allegation was unfounded. According to a 2017 interview with Patricia Tallman, there was a legal case and an out-of-court settlement with Paramount.

=== Influence and legacy ===
Generally viewed as having "launched the new era of television CGI visual effects", Babylon 5 received multiple awards during its initial run, including two consecutive Hugo Awards for best dramatic presentation, and continues to feature in polls and listings of top-rated science fiction series.

Babylon 5 has been praised for its depth and complexity against a backdrop of contemporary shows which largely lacked long-term consequences, with plots typically being resolved in the course of an episode, occasionally two. Straczynski wrote 92 of 110 teleplays, a greater proportion than some of his contemporaries. Reviewers rated the quality of writing on a widely varying scale, identifying both eloquent soliloquies and dialogue that felt "stilted and theatrical."

Straczynski has claimed that the multi-year story arc, now a feature of most mainstream televised drama, is the legacy of the series. He stated that Ronald D. Moore and Damon Lindelof used the 5-year narrative structure of Babylon 5 as blueprints for their respective shows, Battlestar Galactica and Lost. He also claims Babylon 5 was the first series to be shot in the 16:9 aspect ratio, and to use 5.1 channel sound mixes. It was an early example of widespread use of CGI rather than models for space scenes, which allowed for more freedom and larger scale in creating the scenes. While praised at the time, due to budgetary and mastering issues these sequences are considered to have aged poorly.

A theme among reviewers is that the series was more than the sum of its parts: while criticizing the writing, directing, acting and effects, particularly by comparison to current television productions, reviewers praised the consistency of plotting over the series' run, transcending the quality of its individual elements. Many retrospectives, while criticizing virtually every aspect of the production, have praised the series for its narrative cohesion and contribution to serialized television. Producer John Copeland said: "You're not really tuning in to watch the visual effects," instead, people are watching a two-decades-old show because "the storytelling does hold up" and "you wanna spend more time with the characters."

DC began publishing Babylon 5 comics in 1994, with stories (initially written by Straczynski) that closely tied in with events depicted in the show, with events in the comics eventually being referenced onscreen in the television series. The franchise continued to expand into short stories, RPGs, and novels, with the Technomage trilogy of books being the last to be published in 2001, shortly after the spin-off television series, Crusade, was canceled. Excepting movie rights, which are retained by Straczynski, all production rights for the franchise are owned by Warner Bros.

== Media franchise ==
In November 1994, DC began publishing monthly Babylon 5 comics. A number of short stories and novels were also produced between 1995 and 2001. Additional books were published by the gaming companies Chameleon Eclectic and Mongoose Publishing, to support their desk-top strategy and role-playing games.

Three TV films were released by TNT in 1998, after funding a fifth season of Babylon 5, following the demise of the Prime Time Entertainment Network the previous year. In addition to In the Beginning, Thirdspace, and The River of Souls, they released a re-edited special edition of the original 1993 TV film, The Gathering. In 1999, a fifth TV film was also produced, A Call to Arms, which acted as a pilot movie for the spin-off series Crusade, which TNT canceled after 13 episodes had been filmed.

Dell Publishing started publication of a series of Babylon 5 novels in 1995, which were ostensibly considered canon within the TV series' continuity, nominally supervised by Straczynski, with later novels in the line being more directly based upon Straczynski's own notes and story outlines. In 1997, Del Rey obtained the publication license from Warner Bros., and proceeded to release a number of original trilogies directly scenarized by Straczynski, as well as novelizations of three of the TNT telefilms (In the Beginning, Thirdspace, and A Call to Arms). All of the Del Rey novels are considered completely canonical within the filmic Babylon 5 universe.

In 2000, the Sci-Fi Channel purchased the rights to rerun the Babylon 5 series, and it premiered a new telefilm, The Legend of the Rangers in 2002, which failed to be picked up as a series. In 2007, the first in a planned anthology of straight-to-DVD short stories, entitled The Lost Tales, was released by Warner Home Video, but no others were produced, due to funding issues.

Straczynski announced a Babylon 5 film at the 2014 San Diego Comic-Con, but stated in 2016 that it had been delayed while he completed other productions. In 2018, Straczynski stated that although he possesses the movie rights, he believed that neither a film nor television series revival would happen while Warner Bros. retained the intellectual property for the TV series, believing that Warner Bros would insist on handling production, and that other studios would be hesitant to produce a film without also having the rights to the TV series.

=== Reboot ===
A reboot of Babylon 5 was announced in September 2021. It was to be produced by Straczynski through Studio JMS, and developed by Warner Bros. Television for The CW, before Warner took the rights back.

=== Direct-to-video animated film ===
Straczynski revealed in May 2023 that he had been working in secret with Warner Bros. Animation to produce Babylon 5: The Road Home, a full-length animated film. Most of the main surviving cast members voice their characters in the film, including Boxleitner, Christian, Jurasik, Mumy, Scoggins and Tallman. Other voice actors, replacing roles of those that had died, including Paul Guyet as Zathras and Jeffery Sinclair, Anthony Hansen as Michael Garibaldi, Mara Junot as Reporter and Computer Voice, Phil LaMarr as Dr. Stephen Franklin, Piotr Michael as David Sheridan, Andrew Morgado as G'Kar, and Rebecca Riedy as Delenn. The film premiered at Comic-Con in July 2023, and was made available on streaming services and physical media on August 15, 2023.

== Home media ==
In July 1995, Warner Home Video began distributing Babylon 5 VHS video tapes under its Beyond Vision label in the UK. Beginning with the original telefilm, The Gathering, these were PAL tapes, showing video in the same 4:3 aspect ratio as the initial television broadcasts. By the release of Season 2, tapes included closed captioning of dialogue and Dolby Surround sound. Columbia House began distributing NTSC tapes, via mail order in 1997, followed by repackaged collector's editions and three-tape boxed sets in 1999, by which time the original pilot telefilm had been replaced by the re-edited TNT special edition. Additional movie and complete season boxed-sets were also released by Warner Bros. until 2000.

Image Entertainment released Babylon 5 on LaserDisc between December 1998 and September 1999. Produced on double-sided 12-inch Pioneer discs, each contained two episodes displayed in the 4:3 broadcast aspect-ratio, with Dolby Surround audio and closed captioning for the dialogue. Starting with two TNT telefilms, In the Beginning and the re-edited special edition of The Gathering, Seasons 1 and 5 were released simultaneously over a six-month period. Seasons 2 and 4 followed, but with the decision to halt production due to a drop in sales, precipitated by rumors of a pending DVD release, only the first twelve episodes of Season 2 and the first six episodes of Season 4 were ultimately released.

In November 2001, Warner Home Video began distributing Babylon 5 DVDs with a two-movie set containing the re-edited TNT special edition of The Gathering and In The Beginning. The telefilms were later individually released in region 2 in April 2002, though some markets received the original version of The Gathering in identical packaging.

DVD boxed sets of the individual seasons, each containing six discs, began being released in October 2002. Each included a printed booklet containing episode summaries, with each disc containing audio options for German, French, and English, plus subtitles in a wider range of languages, including Arabic and Dutch. Video was digitally remastered from higher resolution PAL broadcast masters and displayed in anamorphic widescreen with remastered and remixed Dolby Digital 5.1 sound. Disc 1 of each set contained an introduction to the season by Straczynski, while disc 6 included featurettes containing interviews with various production staff, as well as information on the fictional universe, and a gag reel. Three episodes in each season also contained commentary from either Straczynski, members of the main cast, and/or the episode director.

Since its initial release, a number of repackaged DVD boxed sets have been produced for various regional markets. With slightly altered cover art, they included no additional content, but the discs were more securely stored in slimline cases, rather than the early "book" format, with hard plastic pages used during the original release of the first three seasons.

Initial DVD release
Episode box sets	Region 1	Region 2	Region 4
Babylon 5: The Complete First Season	November 5, 2002	October 28, 2002	November 27, 2002
Babylon 5: The Complete Second Season	April 29, 2003	May 26, 2003	July 9, 2003
Babylon 5: The Complete Third Season	August 12, 2003	November 10, 2003	December 19, 2003
Babylon 5: The Complete Fourth Season	January 6, 2004	April 19, 2004	August 19, 2004
Babylon 5: The Complete Fifth Season	April 13, 2004	Jan 2005	December 16, 2004
Babylon 5: The Complete Television Series	August 17, 2004	N/A	N/A
Babylon 5: The Complete Universe (inc. all movies and Crusade episodes)	N/A	October 24, 2005	N/A
Movie releases and box sets
Babylon 5: The Gathering / In the Beginning	December 4, 2001	N/A	November 21, 2001
Babylon 5: The Gathering	N/A	April 8, 2002	N/A
Babylon 5: In the Beginning	N/A	April 8, 2002	N/A
Babylon 5: The Movie Collection	August 17, 2004	N/A	March 2, 2005
Babylon 5: Movie Box Set	N/A	February 21, 2005	N/A
Babylon 5: The Legend of the Rangers	March 14, 2006	October 24, 2005	November 16, 2005
Babylon 5: The Lost Tales	July 31, 2007	September 3, 2007	January 2, 2008

On July 19, 2023, Warner announced that Babylon 5 would be released on Blu-ray on December 5, 2023, for the show's 30th anniversary.

=== Mastering problems ===
While the series was in pre-production, studios were looking at ways for their existing shows to make the transition from the standard 4:3 aspect ratio to the widescreen formats that would accompany the next generation of televisions. After visiting Warner Bros., which was stretching the horizontal interval for an episode of Lois & Clark, producer John Copeland convinced them to allow Babylon 5 to be shot on Super 35mm film stock. "The idea being that we would telecine to 4:3 for the original broadcast of the series. But what it also gave us was a negative that had been shot for the new 16×9 widescreen-format televisions that we knew were on the horizon."

The widescreen conversion thing was executive short sightedness at its finest!!! We offered to do ALL of Babylon 5 in widescreen mode if Warner Bros would buy us a reference monitor so we could check our output (only $5000 at the time). Ken Parkes (the "Business affairs" guy) and Netter (penny wise, but pound foolish) said no! So we did everything so it could be CROPPED to be widescreen! Each blamed the other by the way. Doug Netter said, "Ken Parkes said no". Ken Parkes said, "Doug Netter said no". SHEESH!!! So for $75 an episode they could have had AWESOME near Hi-Def.

— Ron Thornton, 2008

Though the CG scenes, and those containing live action combined with digital elements, could have been created in a suitable widescreen format, a cost-saving decision was taken to produce them in the 4:3 aspect ratio. When those images were prepared for widescreen release, the top and bottom of the images were simply cropped, and the remaining image 'blown up' to match the dimensions of the live action footage, noticeably reducing the image quality. The scenes containing live action ready to be composited with matte paintings, CG animation, etc., were delivered on tape already telecined to the 4:3 aspect-ratio, and contained a high level of grain, which resulted in further image noise being present when enlarged and stretched for widescreen.

For the purely live-action scenes, rather than using the film negatives, according to Copeland, "Warners had even forgotten that they had those. They used PAL versions and converted them to NTSC for the US market. They actually didn't go back and retransfer the shows." With the resulting aliasing, and the progressive scan transfer of the video to DVD, this has created a number of visual flaws throughout the widescreen release. In particular, quality has been noted to drop significantly in composite shots.

In 2020, a new remastered version was created (as detailed above) which restored the original picture quality and repaired the damage to the CGI scenes, although this also involved reverting to the original 4:3 aspect ratio. The negatives were scanned at ultra HD quality and then down converted to HD and upscaling programs were used to enhance the CGI to HD at the same time.

== See also ==
- Babylon 5 (franchise)
- Babylon 5's use of the Internet
- The Lurker's Guide to Babylon 5
- rec.arts.sf.tv.babylon5.moderated
