= Klaus Harmony =

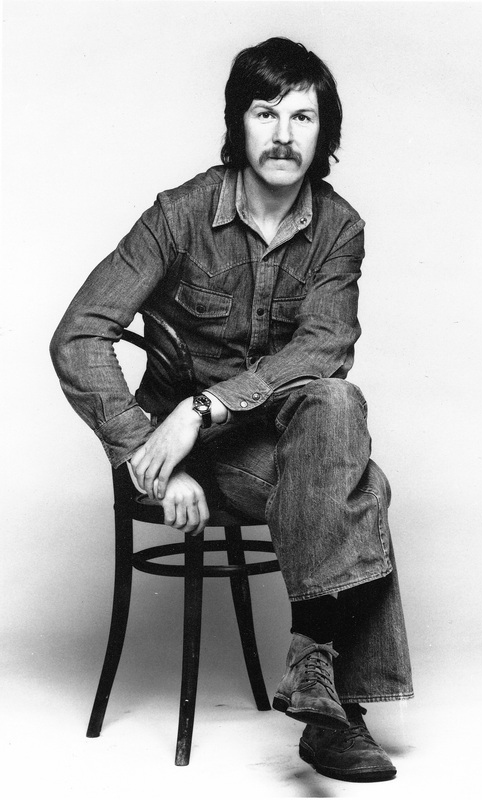

Background information
- Born: 21 January 1941; Baden-Baden, Germany
- Died: 21 January 1984 (aged 43)
- Genres: Porn music; porn groove; funk; lounge music; europop; disco; pastiche
- Occupation: Composer
- Instruments: Fender Rhodes; clavinet; Moog synthesizer
- Labels: HarmonSink; Polytron

Klaus Harmony is a comic fictional composer of music for 1970s European adult movies, and couturier. Created by UK soundtrack composer, Matthew Strachan (also creator of the soundtrack of Who Wants to Be a Millionaire), the character's life story is told through music, images and an extensive series of spoof biographical entries on a multimedia website. While the site itself contains no explicit content, the composer's life and works are presented by alluding to a fictional movie world complete with filmography, discography, and numerous peripheral characters, including a biographer and musicologist.

Following the launch of the website on 2007, both the character and the music have received mentions in popular blogs such as Boing Boing, thrillist.com and publications such as the Los Angeles Times. and the UK's Guardian newspaper.

The music has been used in the Miramax motion picture Extract, and the BBC television adaptation of Martin Amis's novel Money.

== Music ==
The music, released in the form of several volumes of "Klaus Harmony's complete works", is an elaborate and extensive pastiche of porn music and features idiosyncratic imperfections such as tape noise, vinyl crackle and dropouts. The individual tracks are largely instrumental and the style of music encompasses much of what would have been popular throughout Klaus Harmony's "career", incorporating Funk, Disco, Europop, and occasionally straying into styles more akin to 1960s and '70s Detective and Spy-Thriller movie scores. Each of the tracks featured on the complete works are taken from the wider discography of Klaus Harmony, attributed to one of the several fictional movie soundtracks, and afforded sleeve notes, intentionally pretentious in tone.

== Collaborators and contributors ==
A number of artists have contributed to the Klaus Harmony recordings. Actors Isy Suttie, Stephen Carlile, Martin Crewes, Kim Ismay, Philip Pope, Steve Lee (songwriter) and Tim Whitnall have contributed voice work on the recordings along with singers Annie Skates, Michael Dore and Strachan himself and his wife, author, Bernadette Strachan.

== Fictional character biography ==
In tandem with a pulp biography by Godfrey Gilliam (a fictional, mediocre rock music journalist), published on the Klaus Harmony website, the music of Klaus Harmony is also subjected to analytical review in the form of liner notes by the equally fictional and over-serious musicologist, Walter Samuel. Additionally, the life and work of the composer are discussed by 'former friend' Jan Sink, in a weblog.

Klaus Harmony's background is presented as being in pop music, having spent his childhood in Berlin accompanying his mother, Lotte Schmitt, a cabaret performer, on accordion at street corners. The aspiring musician then moves to the Soho district of London in 1959, forming two accordion-led pop bands before meeting pop impresario Peter Wilde. Harmony's band subsequently becomes successful in the US and, in the late 1960s, rebrands itself as 'Kinky Roosevelt', a progressive, heavy rock band.

Following the breakup of Kinky Roosevelt, Klaus Harmony returns to Europe and meets Friedrich Wohlfäht, an aspiring filmmaker with a background as a photographer for clothing catalogs. As a creative and business partnership, they go on to make eleven films including Die Grosse Brustwarze Karnival, Die Sins des Apostles, and The Ladies Man.

Throughout his career, Klaus is married five times to Nerys Stokes, Claudia Piffenhöle (with whom he has a son, Helmut), Theda Wetzel, Lola Schlipp and Suzanne Watkins-Robb, the only spouse to survive him. The most striking moment of his career comes with Gefährliche Brüste (1979), which, in "Wohlfäht's uncompromising style", depicts the death of Harmony's fourth wife, Lola Schlipp, in a plane crash. Suzanne Watkins-Robb plays the role of Lola, and marries the composer a year later in 1980. Following Friedrich Wohlfäht's death in 1981, Klaus Harmony's career sees a decline and he returns to London with Suzanne and Helmut, where he is presumed to be killed in an "unexplained explosion" at a London used record store.

== Fictional character filmography ==
- Elektrische Lippen (1969)
- Wunderchrotchen (1970)
- Die Grosse Brustwarze Karnival (1971)
- Die Sins des Apostles (1972)
- Chenois (1973)
- Who Needs Dialogue? (1975)
- The Ladies Man (1977)
- Meet Miss Jozette (1978)
- Gefähliche Brüste (1979)
- Schaften Lieben (1980)
- Die Sexocist (1981)
- Rumpenmeister (1982)

== Recordings ==
- Oeuvre I, Broad Oak Music (2006)
- Oeuvre Zwei, Broad Oak Music (2007)
- Oeuvre Derde, Broad Oak Music (2008)
- Oeuvre 4, Broad Oak Music (2009)
- Oeuvre Cinq, Broad Oak Music (2010)
- Oeuvre Sechs, Broad Oak Music (2018)
- Oeuvre Sette, Broad Oak Music (2019)
- Oeuvre Acht, Broad Oak Music (2021)
