= Winning Lines =

- Genre: Game show
- Created by: David Briggs; Steve Knight; Mike Whitehill
- Presented by: Simon Mayo (1999–2000); Phillip Schofield (2001–04)
- Composers: Keith Strachan; Matthew Strachan
- Country of origin: United Kingdom
- Original language: English
- No. of series: 6
- No. of episodes: 103

Production
- Production location: Fountain Studios
- Running time: 35 minutes (1999); 40 minutes (2000); 45 minutes (2001–04)
- Production company: Celador Productions

Original release
- Network: BBC One
- Release: 12 June 1999 – 16 October 2004

Related
- The National Lottery Draws

Winning Lines is a National Lottery game show that was broadcast on BBC One from 12 June 1999 to 16 October 2004. It was originally hosted by Simon Mayo and then by Phillip Schofield.

== Gameplay ==
=== Round 1 ===
Forty-nine contestants take part in this round, each is assigned a two-digit number from 01 to 49. In the first series, Mayo asks a question that can be answered by one of these numbers, and anyone who believes that his/her number is the answer may buzz in. Contestants who buzz in wrongly are eliminated. If the owner of the correct number buzzes in, he/she advances to the next round, if not, he/she is eliminated. The host continues to ask questions until six contestants have qualified to advance, at which point all others are eliminated.

The format of this round was changed beginning with the second series. Each contestant now has a keypad on which to enter answers. Mayo or Schofield asks a question with a numerical answer, and the contestant who keys it in first in the fastest time advances to the next round. Anyone who enters an incorrect answer is eliminated from the game. As before, the round ends when six contestants have qualified to advance, and all others are eliminated.

The last digit from each of the six advancing players' numbers are displayed at the end of the show. Any home viewers who can form their own telephone number from these digits (in any order as always mentioned by Simon & Phillip) may call in for a chance to appear on the next episode.

=== Round 2 – Looking After Number One ===
The six qualifying contestants retain their numbers from the first round. The host asks a series of toss-up questions on the buzzer, each of which can be answered with the number of a contestant still in play at the time. If a contestant responds correctly with an opponent's number, that opponent is eliminated; a contestant who responds correctly with his/her own number remains in the game. An incorrect response eliminates the contestant who gave it, regardless of the number. If no one buzzes in on a question, the contestant with the correct number is eliminated. The last remaining contestant advances to the Wonderwall round for a chance to win a trip, whilst the last contestant eliminated from the game wins a holiday in the Countryside.

=== Final Round – The Wonderwall ===
The champion faces a set of three projection screens on which 49 answers are displayed, numbered 1 to 49, and has three minutes to answer as many questions as possible. The host gives the champion 15 seconds to study the answers, after which the questions begin and the clock starts to run. The champion must respond by giving both an answer and its number. The correct answer is then removed from the board, regardless of whether the contestant gave it or not. No penalties were given for incorrect answers.

Twice during the round, the champion may take a "pit stop" by pressing a handheld button. Doing so freezes the clock for 15 seconds, during which the champion may look over the answers again, however, he/she may not respond to the current question until the pit stop has ended.

The champion wins a trip whose destination depends on the number of correct answers given, as shown in the table below. During Schofield's first series as host, the champion then played the Wonderwall again (on the same day as the Wednesday Lotto draw), but with no pit stops, each correct answer awarded £200 with a bonus of £1,000 for getting all 20, for a potential maximum of £5,000. Afterwards, they were then also given the right to start the midweek lottery draws.

The prize for giving only one correct answer was a stay at a bed-and-breakfast near the Gravelly Hill Interchange, popularly referred to as "Spaghetti Junction."

During Simon Mayo's tenure as host, the runner-up in round 2 started the Thunderball draw and the Wonderwall winner started the main Lottery draw. When Schofield took over as host from series three, the Thunderball draw moved to being before round 2, with Schofield himself starting the draw, and the Lottery and Lottery Extra draws took place before the Wonderwall; in the third and fourth series, the runner-up contestant started both the Lottery and Lottery Extra draws, but from the fifth series onwards all draws in the show were started by Schofield.

Correct answers	Vacation		Cash prize
20	Around the World		£5,000
19	Australia		£3,800
18	Barbados		£3,600
17	Hawaii		£3,400
16	Texas	Florida (Note: During the last nine episodes of Series 3, three American destinations were replaced due to the September 11 attacks. Mediterranean Cruise replaced New York, African Beach replaced USA and St. Lucia replaced Florida. They returned at the start of Series 4.)	£3,200
15	Zimbabwe	African Safari	£3,000
14	Caribbean Cruise		£2,800
13	Mauritius		£2,600
12	Las Vegas	USA	£2,400
11	Hong Kong	Dubai (Note: From Series 5, Dubai replaced Hong Kong due to travel restrictions imposed by the SARS outbreak.)	£2,200
10	New York		£2,000
9	Italy		£1,800
8	Majorca		£1,600
7	Monte Carlo		£1,400
6	Paris		£1,200
5	Amsterdam		£1,000
4	Ireland		£800
3	Scottish Castle		£600
2	London		£400
1	Spaghetti Junction		£200

== Transmissions ==
Series	Start date	End date	Episodes	Presenter
1	12 June 1999	4 September 1999	13	Simon Mayo
2	15 April 2000	22 July 2000	13	Simon Mayo
3	9 June 2001	24 November 2001	44	Phillip Schofield
3	13 June 2001	28 November 2001	44	Phillip Schofield
4	3 August 2002	2 November 2002	14	Phillip Schofield
5	19 July 2003	18 October 2003	13	Phillip Schofield
6	11 September 2004	16 October 2004	6	Phillip Schofield

== Winning Lines - Midweek Draws ==
During the third series in 2001, the winner of each edition of Saturday's show had to return on Wednesday to play the Wonderwall again for a chance to win some spending money to take on their holidays. Each correct answer was worth £200, with twenty correct answers earning them a bonus £1,000, to make a total of £5,000. The only sting of the round was that there were no "pitstops". During its one series run, only one contestant managed to answer all 20 questions correctly to win the top prize of £5,000.

== International versions ==
Country	Title	Broadcaster	Presenter	Premiere	Finale
France	Le Numéro gagnant	France 2	Nagui	23 December 2001	18 December 2002
Portugal	Linha Da Sorte	SIC	Carlos Cruz	2002	2003
Turkey	Kazandıran Numaralar	TRT	Cem Ceminay	2001	2001
United States	Winning Lines	CBS	Dick Clark	8 January 2000	18 February 2000

In Italy, between 2000 and 2001, the end-game "The Wonderwall" was played as a segment of Domenica in on Rai Uno and presented by Carlo Conti.
