= Brittany York =

Brittany York may refer to:

- Brittany York (beauty queen), beauty pageant titleholder - Miss North Carolina USA, 2011
- Brittany York, pseudonym of Alison Armitage, an October 1990 Playboy Playmate
