= Winning Lines (American game show) =

- Genre: Game show
- Based on: Winning Lines by: David Briggs; Mike Whitehill; Steven Knight
- Directed by: Jim Yukich
- Presented by: Dick Clark
- Narrated by: Chuck Riley
- Composers: Keith Strachan; Matthew Strachan
- Original language: English
- No. of seasons: 1
- No. of episodes: 10

Production
- Executive producers: David G. Stanley; Scott A. Stone; Paul Smith
- Editor: Scott T. Miller
- Running time: 22–26 minutes
- Production companies: Stone Stanley Entertainment; Celador

Original release
- Network: CBS
- Release: January 8 – February 18, 2000

Winning Lines is an American game show that aired from January 8 to February 18, 2000, the day after its official cancellation. Adapted from the British format of the same name created by David Briggs, Mike Whitehill and Steven Knight, it was considered as CBS's answer to the success of ABC's Who Wants to Be a Millionaire. Winning Lines was hosted by Dick Clark, directed by James Yukich and produced by Stone Stanley Entertainment in conjunction with the British production company, Celador. The announcer for the program was Chuck Riley.

Geraldo Rivera was originally considered to host Winning Lines, but turned it down due to a last-minute contract dispute and CBS got Clark to host it immediately.

== Gameplay ==
=== Round 1 ===
Forty-nine contestants took part; each was assigned a two-digit number from 01 to 49. The host asked a series of mathematical questions, each with a numerical answer, and the contestants had five seconds to enter their answers on numerical keypads. For each question, the contestant who entered the correct answer in the shortest time advanced to the next round. The round ended after six contestants had advanced, and the other 43 were eliminated with no winnings.

=== Round 2: Sudden Death ===
As in the British version, each contestant carried their number from Round 1 with them here. The host asked a series of mathematical questions, each of which could be answered with the number belonging to one of the contestants still in play at the time. If a contestant buzzed in and correctly answered with an opponent's number, that opponent was eliminated; a contestant who correctly responded with their own number remained in the game. An incorrect answer eliminated the contestant who gave it, regardless of the number. If no one buzzed in on a question, the correct answer was revealed and the contestant with that number was eliminated. The last remaining contestant won $2,500 and advanced to the bonus round, while the other five each received $1,000.

=== Bonus Round: The Wonderwall ===
Correct Answers	Prize
20	$1,000,000
19	$500,000
18	$400,000
17	$300,000
16	$200,000
15	$100,000
14	$90,000
13	$80,000
12	$70,000
11	$60,000
10	$50,000
9	$40,000
8	$30,000
7	$25,000
6	$20,000
5	$15,000
4	$10,000
3	$7,500
2	$5,000
0/1	$2,500

The contestant sat facing a bank of three projection screens on which 49 answers were displayed, numbered 01 through 49. They had three minutes to answer as many questions as possible, with each correct answer awarding more money; 20 such answers were required to win the top prize of $1 million. The contestant was given 15 seconds to study the answers at the outset, after which the clock began to run as soon as the host started to read the first question.

As in the British version, the contestant had to call out both the correct answer and its number to be given credit (though here, the number must be stated first). The contestant could take up to two "pit stops," each of which froze the clock for 15 seconds and gave them another chance to look over the board; however, they could not answer until the pit stop had ended. The contestant could also pass on a maximum of two questions. The correct answer was announced and removed from the board when the contestant responded (whether right or wrong), but not if they passed.

Giving an incorrect answer, or failing to answer or pass within 15 seconds after the host had finished a question, gave the contestant a strike. A button near the contestant's seat glowed red once either two strikes had been earned or there were 15 seconds left in the round, whichever came first. They could press this button at any time from that point on to "bail out," ending the round and keeping all accumulated money. If the contestant ran out of time or accumulated three strikes without bailing out, they lost all winnings from this round and left with only the $2,500 won in the main game.

As in the British version, instead of seeing the answers on the three projection screens, home viewers saw them on a display that continually scrolled from side to side. This display automatically jumped to each correct answer when it was revealed, whether given by the contestant or stated by the host after a miss.

This version offered an at-home game similar to the UK version. The second digit from each of the Round 1 winners' numbers and the second digit from the number of the final correct answer given during the Wonderwall were shown at the end of the show. Home viewers who could make up their own home or cell phone number from these digits, without the area code, were eligible to enter a drawing for $50,000.
