= Acapulco H.E.A.T. =

1993 syndicated television series

- Acapulco H.E.A.T. title, as it appeared during the first season
- Created by: Max A. Keller & Micheline H. Keller
- Starring: Catherine Oxenberg; Brendan Kelly; John Vernon; Fabio; Lydie Denier; Alison Armitage; Christa Sauls; Michael Worth; Holly Floria; Graham Heywood; Spencer Rochfort; Randy Vasquez
- Countries of origin: United States; France
- Original language: English
- No. of seasons: 2
- No. of episodes: 48

Production
- Production location: Puerto Vallarta, Mexico
- Running time: 60 minutes
- Production companies: Balenciaga Productions; M6 Films; CNC; Les Films du Triangle; Film Groupe S. A. (1993–94); France Triangle Films (1996); Max Keller & Micheline Keller Productions

Original release
- Network: Syndication (United States); M6 (France)
- Release: September 28, 1993 – June 5, 1999

Acapulco H.E.A.T. is a 1993 syndicated television series. It follows the adventures of the "Hemisphere Emergency Action Team" (H.E.A.T.), a group of top-secret agents based in Acapulco, Mexico, recruited by "C-5", a secret, inter-governmental coalition to fight terrorism and other international crimes. To keep a low profile, the team poses as models and photographers representing a beach-fashion business. The show returned for a second season (production started in 1996) with a new and smaller cast; it aired in Europe in 1997, and in the United States during 1998–99.

== Synopsis ==
Led by Ashley Hunter-Coddington (Catherine Oxenberg), a former MI6 operative, and Mike Savage (Brendan Kelly), a former CIA agent, the H.E.A.T. members fight international terrorism. They receive their assignments from "Mr. Smith" (John Vernon), the mysterious head of C-5, a secret governmental organization linked to the United Nations. The team operates from both Puerto Vallarta, Mexico and internationally under the 'cover' of a beach fashion enterprise.

The team's members are: Catherine "Cat" Avery Pascal (Alison Armitage), a French former cat-burglar who had to choose between life imprisonment and working in H.E.A.T. for a year in order to have a "clean-slate"; Tommy Chase (Michael Worth), a martial arts expert with a deep understanding of human psychology; Brett Richardson (Spencer Rochfort), a former Navy SEAL with a vast knowledge of explosives.

Krissie Valentine (Holly Floria), a computer genius who can do anything with computers, no matter the situation and, who eventually becomes romantically involved with teammate Marcos Chavez (Randy Vasquez), a member of Mexico's Los Federales, and whose local contacts in their base-of-operations prove very helpful. Arthur Small (Graham Heywood), owner of Acapulco H.E.A.T. Beach Fashion who manages both the team's logistics and its members' false identities in the "Beach Fashion Enterprise" and, Claudio Divanti (Fabio), owner of the hotel where the team is headquartered.

Catherine ("Cat") Avery Pascal and Tommy Chase are the only original characters to return in Season Two. The Season Two storyline explained the time gap (about 3 years) between seasons by stating that the (Season One) H.E.A.T. team had disbanded a few years after the events of Season One. In the interim, "Cat" became a beach-fashion photographer, and Tommy became a "lone wolf", taking odd jobs to survive and still managing to fight local drug dealers. The two were recruited by ex-spy Nicole Bernard (Lydie Denier) and her protégée, Joanna Barnes (Christa Sauls) a computer expert. They continued fighting crime backed by private investors; their "cover": owners of a beach-fashion boutique ("Acapulco HEAT Beach Fashion").

== Production ==
The show initially produced only one season (1993–94). Following a two-year court battle regarding the rights to the series, Acapulco H.E.A.T. was brought back for a second season with a mostly new cast. This second season was produced in 1996 for worldwide distribution, but also aired in the U.S. during the 1998–99 television season. A planned third season did not materialize. A total of 48 episodes were made and have developed a fan base and international audience. The series continues to be broadcast on cable and streaming channels.

The show's theme song, "I Feel the Heat," was sung by Sable Jeffries (first season) and Pepper Mashay (second season).

== Cast and characters ==
=== Season 1 (1993–94) ===
- Ashley Hunter-Coddington (Catherine Oxenberg) – A former British MI6 operative and one of the co-leaders of the H.E.A.T. team. She is the daughter of an English ambassador stationed in Rome. Her mother was killed by a Red Brigade member while she was still a child. This traumatic event triggered the need to become a government agent. Her codename is "Sarong" and she worked undercover as a beach fashion designer.
- Michael "Mike" Savage (Brendan Kelly) – A former CIA agent and co-leader of the H.E.A.T. team. He also posed as a beach fashion designer for the model agency and his codename is "Platform".
- Catherine (Cat) Avery Pascal (Alison Armitage) – A French ex-cat burglar, who was required to join the team after being arrested for her crimes. She had to stay with the team for a year in order to avoid prison sentence. She eventually accepted that being on the side of justice was far better. She poses as one of the models of the agency and her codename is "High Dive".
- Brett Richardson (Spencer Rochfort) – A former Navy SEAL and the team's weapons and explosive expert. Posed as one of the team's models and his codename is "Deep End".
- Krissie Valentine (Holly Floria) – A computer expert. She provides the team with useful information and research for their missions. Poses undercover as one of the models of the agency and, through the season, got romantically involved with Marcos. Her codename is "Spring Board".
- Marcos Chavez (Randy Vasquez) – A member of the Federales in Mexico and an expert in undercover missions. He was romantically involved with Krissie. He poses as the one responsible for providing transportation for the equipment the team uses during their work in fashion (and actually, with the equipment used on their missions) and also as a Taxi driver. Most of his family members have served as providers of useful information. His codename is "Agua Azul".
- Tommy Chase (Michael Worth) – A government member responsible for personality analyses. He is an expert in martial arts and has the "zen warrior" mentality. Poses as one of the team male models; his codename is "Backflip".
- Arthur Small (Graham Heywood) – Owner of the beach fashion enterprise, Acapulco Heat beach fashion, which served has the cover for the H.E.A.T. members. Also helped sort out the logistics of each mission.
- Claudio Divanti (Fabio) – Owner of the hotel where the team have their headquarters. Used to flirt with Ashley, much to Mike's dislike.
- Mr. Smith (John Vernon) – One of the government representatives of C-5, a secret coalition that tasks H.E.A.T. with their missions. C-5 was composed by various members of the U.N. He is seen only via video link.

=== Season 2 (1998–99) ===
- Catherine (Cat) Avery Pascal (Alison Armitage) – Between the first and second seasons, she became a beach-fashion photographer. As one of the original members of the H.E.A.T. team, she now had to deal with the responsibility of being her own boss. Her new cover was of one of the owners of a small boutique called "Acapulco HEAT Beach Fashions".
- Tommy Chase (Michael Worth) – Between the first and second seasons, he started seeing the world with more cynical eyes. He launched a personal fight against drug dealers and small crime. He is the other original member of the H.E.A.T. team to join the new team incarnation. His new cover was of an employee of the small boutique "Acapulco HEAT Beach Fashions".
- Nicole Bernard (Lydie Denier) – A former French spy that re-organized the H.E.A.T. team to help her track a stolen necklace, but decided to keep working with them. Her cover was of one of the owners of a small boutique called "Acapulco HEAT Beach Fashions". Very serious, she has trouble trusting people, though she has plenty of trust in her new allies.
- Joanna Barnes (Christa Sauls) – The new computer expert of the team and a protégée of Nicole. She can do anything with a computer, though she can never explain how or what she did. Her cover was of one of the employees of the small boutique "Acapulco HEAT Beach Fashions". Though naive, she struggles to keep up a serious appearance.

In Season 2 episode 'Blood Ties', original cast members from Season 1, Spencer Rochfort and Randy Vasquez, returned for a special appearance as their characters Brett Richardson and Marcos Chavez. Brett retired from his activities as a government agent and Marcus, also retired from activity, has become the owner of a limousine company.

=== Notable guest stars ===
- James Healey as Niel Strake, the actual H.E.A.T. team nemesis. (Season 1)
- Pedro Armendáriz Jr. as Colonel Rodriguez (Season 1)
- Clifton Collins Jr. as David Kern (Season 1)
- Tristan Rogers as John Hardy (Season 1)
- James Booth as Andre Sokol (Season 1)
- Neil Dickson as Lorenzo Conte, a Green Victory Agent (Season 1)
- Christopher Neame as Werner Steinholtz (Season 1)
- Liliana Komorowska as Frederika Fluke (Season 1)
- Vaitiare Hirshon as Carmen Chavez (Season 1)
- Julie Bowen as Danielle Perkins (Season 1)
- Nicholas Ball as Derek Perkins (Season 1)
- Andrew Divoff as The Raven (Season 2)
- David Carradine as Victor Garrison (Season 2)
- Chase Masterson as Gwen (Season 2)
- Catherine McGoohan as Natasha Simonova (Season 1) and Sister Margaret (Season 2)
- Tom Paolino as Finley Fairfax (Season 2)
- Richard Lynch as Elliot Roth (Season 2)

== Episodes ==
Season	Episodes	Originally released	
Season	Episodes	First released	Last released
1	22	September 28, 1993	May 21, 1994
2	26	September 23, 1998	June 5, 1999

=== Season 1 (1993–94) ===
The first season was produced for syndication in the United States for the 1993–94 television season.

List of Acapulco H.E.A.T. season 1 episodes
No. overall	No. in season	Title	Directed by	Written by	Original release date	Prod. code
1	1	"Code Name: Checkmate (Parts 1 & 2)"	Kevin James Dobson	Molly Glenmore, Steve Hayes & Daniel Fica	September 25, 1993	101–102
2	2	"Code Name: Checkmate (Parts 1 & 2)"	Kevin James Dobson	Molly Glenmore, Steve Hayes & Daniel Fica	September 25, 1993	101–102
3	3	"Code Name: Honeymoon Lost"	Sidney Hayers	Steve Hayes & Daniel Fica	October 9, 1993	103
4	4	"Code Name: Strange Bedfellows"	Henri Safran	Steve Hayes & Daniel Fica	October 16, 1993	109
5	5	"Code Name: Million Dollar Ladies" "Vanished"	Sidney Hayes	Steve Hayes & Daniel Fica	October 23, 1993	111
6	6	"Code Name: Feminine Intuition"	Harry Ambrose	Steve Hayes & Daniel Fica	October 30, 1993	105
7	7	"Code Name: Desert Dragon"	Harry Ambrose	Steve Hayes & Daniel Fica	November 6, 1993	112
8	8	"Code Name: Archangel"	Henri Safran	Molly Glenmore & Daniel Fica	November 13, 1993	104
9	9	"Code Name: Arabesque"	Sidney Hayers	Molly Glenmore & Daniel Fica	November 20, 1993	107
10	10	"Code Name: Body Double"	Harry Ambrose	Steve Hayes & Daniel Fica	November 27, 1993	113
11	11	"Code Name: Perfect Specimen"	Harry Ambrose	Steve Hayes & Daniel Fica	December 4, 1993	106
12	12	"Code Name: Easy Riders"	Sidney Hayers	Sidney Hayers & Daniel Fica	January 22, 1994	115
13	13	"Code Name: Rip Van Winkle"	Sidney Hayers	Molly Glenmore & Daniel Fica	January 29, 1994	114
14	14	"Code Name: The Stalking Horse"	Sidney Hayers	Daniel Fica	February 5, 1994	119
15	15	"Code Name: Frameup"	Sidney Hayers	Steve Hayes & Daniel Fica	February 12, 1994	108
16	16	"Code Name: Ghosts"	Sidney Hayers	Steve Hayes & Daniel Fica	February 19, 1994	116
17	17	"Code Name: Stranded"	Sidney Hayers	Steve Hayes & Daniel Fica	February 26, 1994	120
18	18	"Code Name: Shamrock"	Harry Ambrose	Steve Hayes & Daniel Fica	March 5, 1994	110
19	19	"Code Name: Stalemate – Part 1"	Harry Ambrose	Molly Glenmore & Daniel Fica	April 30, 1994	117
20	20	"Code Name: Stalemate – Part 2"	Harry Ambrose	Molly Glenmore & Daniel Fica	May 7, 1994	118
21	21	"Code Name: Deep Six"	Sidney Hayers	Story by : Jon Hardy & J. Barry Herron; Teleplay by : Steve Hayes & Daniel Fica	May 14, 1994	121
22	22	"Code Name: Assassin"	Harry Ambrose	Molly Glenmore & Daniel Fica	May 21, 1994	122

=== Season 2 (1998–99) ===
The second season was produced in 1996 for European distribution and airing in 1997, but was not syndicated in the United States until the 1998–99 television season. The dates listed below are the U.S. airdates.

List of Acapulco H.E.A.T. season 2 episodes
No. overall	No. in season	Title	Directed by	Written by	Original air date (U.S.)	Prod. code	US viewers (millions)
23	1	"Code Name: The Raven (Part 1)"	Henri Safran	Peter Collins	September 23, 1998	201	
24	2	"Code Name: The Raven (Part 2)"	Henri Safran	Peter Collins	September 30, 1998	202	
25	3	"Code Name: Spear of Destiny"	Frank Charles	Steve Hayes	October 7, 1998	208	
26	4	"Code Name: Day of the Dead"	Henri Safran	Molly Glenmore	October 14, 1998	218	
27	5	"Code Name: Dream Girl"	Peter George	John Bull	October 21, 1998	209	
28	6	"Code Name: The Killing Club"	Henri Safran	Peter Collins	October 28, 1998	206	
29	7	"Code Name: Mr. Paradise"	Brianne Murphy	Peter Collins	November 4, 1998	213	
30	8	"Code Name: The Mouse That Squeaked"	Brianne Murphy	Steve Hayes	November 11, 1998	221	
31	9	"Code Name: Easy Green"	Frank Charles	Henry Ackerman	November 18, 1998	203	
32	10	"Code Name: Dangerous Bait"	Frank Charles	Steve Hayes	November 25, 1998	205	
33	11	"Code Name: Million Dollar Man"	Brianne Murphy	Peter Collins	December 2, 1998	223	
34	12	"Code Name: Death of a Friendship"	Henri Safran	Steve Hayes	January 23, 1999	216	
35	13	"Code Name: Sister Soothsayer"	Frank Charles	Peter Collins	January 30, 1999	207	
36	14	"Code Name: Hot Chains"	Brianne Murphy	Steve Hayes	February 6, 1999	217	
37	15	"Code Name: Death Do Us Part"	Henri Safran	Molly Glenmore	February 13, 1999	212	
38	16	"Code Name: Cumshaw"	Brianne Murphy	Henry Ackerman	February 20, 1999	211	
39	17	"Code Name: Phantom"	Henri Safran	Molly Glenmore	February 27, 1999	224	
40	18	"Code Name: Bucket of Blood"	Henri Safran	Teagan Clive	March 6, 1999	210	
41	19	"Code Name: Cult Zero"	Henri Safran	Teagan Clive	March 13, 1999	214	
42	20	"Code Name: Blood Ties"	Henri Safran	Steve Hayes	April 24, 1999	215	
43	21	"Code Name: Matador"	Henri Safran	Henry Ackerman	May 1, 1999	222	
44	22	"Code Name: Juice"	Henri Safran	Teagan Clive	May 8, 1999	204	
45	23	"Code Name: Lollipop, Lollipop"	Brianne Murphy	Peter Collins & Paul Nuncio	May 15, 1999	219	
46	24	"Code Name: The Stolen Leg"	Peter George	Steve Hayes	May 22, 1999	220	
47	25	"Code Name: Flight 401"	Henri Safran	Molly Glenmore	May 29, 1999	225	
48	26	"Code Name: I Remember"	Henri Safran	Peter Collins	June 5, 1999	226	

== Home media ==
Mill Creek Entertainment released the entire series on DVD in Region 1 in 2006. On May 6, 2008, Mill Creek Entertainment released Acapulco H.E.A.T.- The Complete series, an 11-disc boxset featuring all 48 episodes of the series.

As of 2010, these releases have been discontinued and are out of print. As of 2014, all episodes from season 1 could be watched on YouTube, at the Keller Entertainment Group official Acapulco H.E.A.T. channel, before as of 2021, being available for streaming. As of July 2021, the show is airing on a United States digital channel American Classic Entertainment, otherwise known as Ace.

- First season DVDs: contain all episodes, with dual soundtrack (English and Spanish); also include several extras, such as promotional pictures, interviews and bios of the cast, and some TV promos.
- Second season DVDs: contain all episodes, with dual soundtrack (English and Spanish); also include several extras, such as promotional pictures, cast bios, interviews with Michael Worth and Lydie Denier, and a TV promo. The first and second episode contain production commentaries by Worth.

DVD name	Ep #	Release date
Acapulco H.E.A.T.: The Complete First Season	22	June 27, 2006
Acapulco H.E.A.T.: The Complete Second and Final Season	26	October 31, 2006
Acapulco H.E.A.T.: The Complete Series	48	May 6, 2008
