= David Hirsch (television personality) =

American television personality (born 1962)

David Hirsch (born 1962 in Detroit) is an American television personality. A graduate of Michigan State University, Hirsch spent time as a disc jockey and drummer. Dick Clark selected Hirsch to be the host of the 1989 (and final) season of American Bandstand. Later, Hirsch became the co-host of the 1994 syndicated game show Beach Clash.
