= Next Door's Baby =

- Cast Recording
- Judd Music Ltd
- Music: Matthew Strachan
- Lyrics: Matthew Strachan
- Book: Bernie Gaughan
- Productions: 2008 Orange Tree Theatre

Next Door's Baby is a musical with music and lyrics by Matthew Strachan and book by Bernie Gaughan (whose novels are published under the name Bernadette Strachan), based on Gaughan's radio play of the same name. Set in 1950's Dublin, it tells the story of two neighbouring families who attempt to reconcile their lives with secrets they have kept to avoid facing public shame. The two daughters of the families strike up an unlikely friendship which leads them to contemplate running away and leaving their families behind.

== Orange Tree Theatre Production ==
The musical's first production was at the Orange Tree Theatre, London in 2008 starring Louise Gold, Riona O'Connor and Stephen Carlile.

The show was written for the theatre by the husband and wife team of Strachan and Gaughan, Strachan having had close links with the theatre, composing music for several plays and acted as musical director for productions of Kander and Ebb's Flora the Red Menace and The Rink.

=== Cast ===
- Louise Gold
- Vincent Shiels
- Clare Louise Connolly
- Stephen Carlile
- Riona O'Connor
- Brenda Longman
- Emily Sills
- Robert Gill
- Elinor Lawless
- Peter Basham

=== Creative Team ===
- Director, Paul Prescott
- Musical Director, David Randall
- Designer, Sam Dowson
- Lighting, Stuart Burgess

== Cast Recording ==
The cast recording is based on the workshop performance of the musical at the Orange Tree Theatre in 2006.

=== Cast ===
- Kim Ismay
- Vincent Shiels
- Kerris Peeling
- Stephen Carlisle
- Riona O'Connor
- Brenda Longman
- Carli Norris
- Philip Pope
- Elinor Lawless
- Martin Crewes

== Synopsis ==
=== Act one ===
It is Thursday afternoon. The play opens with a Josef Locke record playing on the wireless as Mrs O'Brien enters her kitchen and turns the radio off abruptly. As she makes pastry she sings about the rigours of being sole head of the house. (HOLD IT ALL TOGETHER) During the song, her children - Larry, Sheila, Dickie, Orla and Conor - enter boisterously. At the end of the number, they are seated, ready for dinner. They disapprovingly discuss their next door neighbours, the Hennessy family, who are seen lit in a separate space, eating their own dinner. Mrs O'Brien mentions Miriam having been recently widowed and moving back from New York. The local newspaper arrives in the O'Brien kitchen and Sheila reads it aloud. She reads out an item about a baby competition and Mrs O'Brien is suddenly transfixed, determined to enter little Conor. Dickie's fiancé, Dymphna, arrives with news that baby Max Hennessy from next door (Miriam's son) is to be entered for it. Mrs O'Brien is roused and commands Sheila to complete an entry letter for Conor immediately. The family disperses and Dymphna nags Dickie to set a wedding date. Mrs O'Brien sets off to post Conor's entry to the competition.

Mrs O'Brien meets Mrs Hennessy unexpectedly in the street, both apparently on their way to the pillar box. They engage in a thinly veiled exchange of one-up-man-ship. (JUST GRAND)

The following day, Orla notices Mrs O'Brien with Sheila applying rouge to baby Conor's face before they leave to have his competition photo taken. Orla voices her horror but is told sharply by her mother to stay behind and do chores. Orla waits until they have departed, grabs her coat and stomps out, bemoaning her mother's constant censure. (DO THIS, DO THAT) Orla reaches the canal and sees Miriam Hennessy sitting on a bench. The two girls strike up a conversation and Orla tells Miriam what has upset her. They arrange to meet again the following evening.

Later the same day, the O'Briens are gathered in their kitchen. Dymphna, once again, nags Dickie about setting a date to marry. Uncle Willy arrives brandishing a letter from his son, Gerard, who has emigrated to London. A disturbance is heard next door and they flock to the window in a bid to see what is happening. They hear a man's voice with an American accent calling for Miriam. Mrs O'Brien expresses disgust and ushers the family out in order to soothe baby Conor. (MRS O'BRIEN'S LULLABY)

The following evening, Orla and Miriam meet at the Canal side again. Miriam entreats Orla to talk more about herself but Orla is reluctant. Miriam confesses that she is not a young widow as everyone believes, but separated from her American husband, Conrad, who has been beating her. Having lightened her load, she surmises that there is more to Orla than meets the eye and warns her to beware of keeping secrets. (SECRETS)

Both the O'Brien and Hennessy families are gathered at the church for Sunday evening Mass. (HYMN: SHOW US MERCY). Fr Frank meets the congregation as they leave the church. Mrs O'Brien and Mrs Hennessy compete for his attention, Sheila wants to engage Fr Frank in theological debate and Dymphna is looking rather preoccupied as she clings to Dickie's arm. Mrs O'Brien conspicuously shoos the family on home in order to leave Dickie and Dymphna to walk home on their own. Dickie is suspicious and rightly so as Dymphna demands that he commit to a wedding date. He is elusive and as they reach the O'Brien house, she offers an ultimatum and storms off. Dickie is left to consider his situation. (SOUNDS FAMILIAR)

Mr and Mrs Hennessy are out for a stroll, Mr Hennessy holding a bunch of flowers. They reflect smugly on the differences between them and the O'Briens, apparently savouring their freedom from the noise and mayhem brought by the numerous children next door. Towards the end of the song Mr Hennessy passes his wife the flowers who places them discreetly at the graveside of the child they lost. (OTHER PEOPLE)

Next Thursday in the O'Brien kitchen, the newspaper has arrived and baby Conor is through to the next round of the competition. We also see the Hennessy family receiving the news that Max too has gone through. The women of the two households express their disapproval and jealousies. (NEXT DOOR'S BABY) Mrs O'Brien then has to rush out to keep an eye on her Great Aunty Mary who has had a bad turn. She reluctantly leaves Conor with Orla. During her rare moment alone with the baby, Orla recalls Miriam's warnings about secrets. (ORLA'S LULLABY/SECRETS II). It is at this moment, at the end of act one, that we realise for certain that Conor is actually Orla's child.

=== Act two ===
The following Monday Orla and Dickie meet for lunch at the seafront. He tells Orla that as a lad he dreamt of being a Canadian Mountie and even applied when he was sixteen, Mrs O'Brien finding out at the last minute and foiling his plan. He asks Orla if she has never thought of running away. She is surprised by the question. He wonders how it might be if he had gone. (RED AND BLUE)

On Tuesday evening in the O'Brien kitchen, everyone is at their station preparing for dinner. Orla attempts repeatedly to take charge of Conor, her mother resisting until an argument ensues. Tired of her mother's shame, Orla quips that her daddy would never have allowed this sort of behaviour. Mrs O'Brien loses her temper and tells Orla never to make assumption about her late father. Orla leaves, crying and Dickie follows. Mrs O'Brien thinks of her husband and their father. (MY CHRISTY)

At the canal on Wednesday lunchtime, Orla and Miriam meet and Miriam has guessed Orla's secret. She persuades Orla that they should run away to London together to be free from their families and the terrible secrecy. She tells Orla she has an American friend in London with whom they could stay. Orla is terrified but thrilled by the idea and they make a pact to run away together with their babies the following week.

That night Miriam is alone indoors and hears a noise outside. She sees Conrad standing on the front path. He is drunk and she tries to shoo him away but he is insistent. Miriam lets him in and he pleads with her to return with him to America where they will make a fresh start on a small farm in New England, away from his parents. He explains that it is their high expectations of him that makes him so angry and promises to change. He tells her his love for her is stronger than ever. Through frightened by his insistence, Miriam is resolute and tells him to leave, adding that she wishes he really was dead. (PASSION)

The following day Dymphna arrives at the O'Brien house with Dickie in tow ready to make an announcement. He tells everyone sheepishly that they have set their wedding date. Mrs O'Brien is thrilled and excitedly discusses wedding plans with the other ladies. Dickie considers what he has done. (SOUNDS FAMILIAR II) Sheila runs in with the local paper. Conor is through to the final of the baby competition. Again, we switch between the houses of the two families to find that Max is also a finalist. Mrs O'Brien gloats that she is the mother of the bonniest baby in Dublin. She tells Sheila and Orla that they will understand her motherly pride one day. She is gently chided by Dickie and wonders what the benefits of motherhood are. She is joined by Mrs Hennessy, Miriam and Orla, each woman in her own space, singing about her own perspective. (WHAT MOTHERS DO)

On Wednesday evening, Mrs O'Brien rounds everyone up for a visit to Great Aunty Mary who is on her death bed. Orla is distracted and Dickie senses that something is up. Mrs O'Brien asks her to stay behind and do laundry. He tries to persuade her to come along but she insists on staying behind. As the family leaves, Orla is aware that this is the last time she will see her mother and is fond with her for a moment. It is lost on Mrs O'Brien who is puzzled by the display of affection. Once the family has gone, Orla goes upstairs and returns with her packed suitcase.

That night Orla waits with Conor at the bus station for Miriam who arrives late, with no baby and no luggage. Miriam tells Orla that she won't be coming. Orla is confused and Miriam explains that she believes she can make a good life with Conrad back in America after all. Orla is horrified and distressed for her friend but Miriam has made up her mind. She urges Orla to go anyway and gives her the address of her friend from America. The two girls embrace and bid a tearful farewell and Orla is left alone. (HELLO ME) Two months later Mrs O'Brien is soldiering on in the kitchen. With Josef Locke playing on the wireless, the family drifts away one by one. Dickie pops back in to remind her that a letter from Orla in London is still waiting to be read. She claims to be too busy and continues with her work. Once alone, she stares at unopened letter before finishing her chores and exiting. (HOLD IT ALL TOGETHER II)

== Musical numbers ==
Act I

- Hold It All Together - Mrs O'Brien
- Just Grand - Mrs O'Brien, Mrs Hennessy
- Do This, Do That - Orla, Miriam
- Mrs O'Brien's Lullaby - Mrs O'Brien
- Secrets - Miriam, Orla
- Hymn: Show Us Mercy - Company
- Sounds Familiar - Dickie
- Other People - Mrs Hennessy, Mr Hennessy
- Next Door's Baby - Company
- Orla's Lullaby/Secrets - Orla

Act II

- Red And Blue - Dickie, Orla
- My Christy - Mrs O'Brien
- Passion - Conrad, Miriam
- Sounds Familiar - Dickie
- What Mother's Do - Mrs O'Brien, Mrs Hennessy, Miriam, Orla
- Hello Me - Orla
- Orla's Letter/Hold It All Together - Mrs O'Brien
