= The Sound of Musicals =

BBC television series

The Sound of Musicals was a 2006 four part BBC series starring several different musical theatre actors and some other professional singers who performed acts from different musicals. Each week the standard cast was joined by a celebrity guest host who also performed their favourite numbers. The show also featured interviews with people involved in musical theatre such as Andrew Lloyd Webber, and Cameron Mackintosh.

It aired weekly (every Saturday) for four weeks starting Saturday 14 January 2006.

== Filming ==
Each part of the show was filmed in front of a live audience during the autumn of 2005 the dates of filming are as follows – 30 September, 2 October, 4 and 6 October.

== Standard cast ==
- John Barrowman
- Carrie Grant
- David Grant
- Ruthie Henshall
- Jon Lee
- Mica Paris

== Guest hosts ==
- Jill Halfpenny
- Aled Jones
- Les Dennis

== Other singers ==
- Joseph McManners (one episode)

== Songs Performed ==
=== Episode One ===
	Song	Musical	Performed by
01	Summer Nights	Grease	2006 Grease Revival Cast
02	I Dreamed a Dream	Les Misérables	Ruthie Henshall
03	Music of the Night	The Phantom of the Opera	David Grant
04	Wouldn't It Be Loverly	My Fair Lady	Jill Halfpenny
05	Anything You Can Do	Annie Get Your Gun	John Barrowman / Ruthie Henshall
06	I Don't Know How to Love Him	Jesus Christ Superstar	Mica Paris
07	As Long As He Needs Me	Oliver!	Carrie Grant
08	Come What May	Moulin Rouge!	Jon Lee /Jill Halfpenny

Week 1 Closing Medley—Jesus Christ Superstar, The Time Warp, (The Rocky Horror Show, John Barrowman), Tell Me It's Not True (Blood Brothers, Jill Halfpenny), Seasons of Love (Rent, Jon Lee, Carrie & David Grant), Memory (Cats, Mica Paris), One Day More (Les Misérables, John Barrowman, Jon Lee, Ruthie Henshall, Carrie Grant, & Company)

=== Episode Two ===
Week 2 Opening Medley: Comedy Tonight (Cast), Broadway Baby (Carrie Grant), You Can't Take That Away From Me (John Barrowman), On The Street Where You Live (Jon Lee), I Won't Send Roses (David Grant), All That Jazz (Ruthie Henshall)

	Song	Musical	Performed by
01	Till There Was You	The Music Man	Jon Lee
02	Don't Cry for Me Argentina	Evita	Carrie Grant
03	Name of the Game	Mamma Mia!	2005 Mamma Mia Cast John Alastair, Sophia Ragavellas
04	Dancing Queen	Mamma Mia!	2005 Mamma Mia Cast, Viven Parry, Kim Ismay, Lara Mulgahy
05	Close Every Door	Joseph and the Amazing Technicolor Dreamcoat	Aled Jones
06	The Way You Look Tonight	Swing Time	Mica Paris
07	Maria	West Side Story	John Barrowman
08	Maybe This Time	Cabaret	Ruthie Henshall
09	Swell Party	High Society	David Grant, Aled Jones

Week 2 Closing Cole Porter Medley: Anything Goes (Ruthie Henshall), My Heart Belongs to Daddy (Carrie Grant), Too Darn Hot (Mica Paris), Who Wants to be a Millionaire (David Grant, Carrie Grant)

=== Episode Three ===
Week 3 Introduction—Wilkommen (John Barrowman), Hello Dolly (Ruthie Henshall), If They Could See Me Now (Carrie Grant), Matchmaker, Matchmaker (Mica Paris), Edelweiss (Jon Lee), Somewhere (David Grant & Company)

	Song	Musical	Performed by
01	Walking in the Air	The Snowman	Joseph McManners
02	Can You Feel the Love Tonight	The Lion King	David Grant
03	Send in the Clowns	A Little Night Music	Ruthie Henshall
04	Younger Than Springtime	South Pacific	Jon Lee
05	Summertime	Porgy and Bess	Mica Paris
06	Mr Cellophane	Chicago (musical)	Les Dennis
07	What I Did For Love	A Chorus Line	Carrie Grant
08	Sunset Boulevard	Sunset Boulevard	John Barrowman
09	You're Just in Love	Call Me Madam	Jon Lee, Ruthie Henshall

Children's Medley (closing) -- Chitty Chitty Bang Bang (Chitty Chitty Bang Bang, Jon Lee, David Grant, Ruthie Henshall, Les Dennis, Joseph McManners), Supercalifragilistic (Mary Poppins, Ruthie Henshall & same), Part of Your World (The Little Mermaid, Carrie Grant), Bad Guys (Bugsy Malone, Jon Lee & David Grant), The Bare Necessities (The Jungle Book, Les Dennis & Joseph McManners), Tomorrow (Annie, Ruthie Henshall & company)

=== Episode Four ===
	Song	Musical	Performed by
01	Everything's Coming Up Roses	Gypsy	Ruthie Henshall
02	Hopelessly Devoted To You	Grease	Carrie Grant
03	Ole Man River	Show Boat	Sir Willard White
04	I’ve Never Been in Love Before	Guys And Dolls	David Grant
05	We'd Go Dancing	Billy Elliot	Billy Elliot OLC Ann Emery, Liam Mower
06	Electricity	Billy Elliot	Billy Elliot OLC Liam Mower, Tim Healy
07	And I'm Tellin You	Dreamgirls	Mica Paris
08	Beauty and the Beast	Beauty and the Beast	Carrie Grant, David Grant
09	Evermore Without You	The Woman in White	Jon Lee
10	I Am What I Am	La Cage aux Folles	John Barrowman

Week 4 (Finale) Medley—There's No Business Like Show Business (Annie Get Your Gun, Company), Come on Get Happy (Ruthie Henshall), Good Morning (Singing in the Rain, Jon Lee, Carrie & David Grant), Try To Remember (The Fantasticks, John Barrowman & Company), There's No Business Like Show Business (Annie Get Your Gun, Company)

== Medleys ==
- Week 1 Closing Medley—Jesus Christ Superstar, The Time Warp, (The Rocky Horror Show, John Barrowman), Tell Me It's Not True (Blood Brothers, Jill Halfpenny), Seasons of Love (Rent, Jon Lee, Carrie & David Grant), Memory (Cats, Mica Paris), One Day More (Les Misérables, John Barrowman, John Lee, Ruthie Hensall, Carrie Grant, & Company)
- Week 2 Introduction—Comedy Tonight (John Barrowman, Carrie and David Grant, Ruthie Henshall, Jon Lee), Broadway Baby (Follies, Carrie Grant), You Can't Take That Away from Me (Crazy for You, John Barrowman), The Street Where You Live (My Fair Lady, John Lee)
- Week 3 Introduction—Wilkommen (Cabaret, John Barrowman), Hello Dolly (Hello Dolly, Ruthie Henshall), If They Could See Me Now (Sweet Charity, Carrie Grant), Matchmaker, Matchmaker (Fiddler on the Roof, Mica Paris), Edelweiss (The Sound of Music, Jon Lee), Somewhere a Place For Us (West Side Story, David Grant & Company)
- Week 4 (Finale) Medley—There's No Business Like Show Business (Annie Get Your Gun, Company), Get Happy (Ruthie Henshall), Good Morning (Singing in the Rain, Jon Lee, Carrie & David Grant), Try To Remember (The Fantasticks, John Barrowman & Company), There's No Business Like Show Business (Annie Get Your Gun, Company)
- Children's Medley (closing) -- Chitty Chitty Bang Bang (Chitty Chitty Bang Bang, Jon Lee, David Grant, Ruthie Henshall, Les Dennis, Joseph McManners), Supercalifragilistic (Mary Poppins, Ruthie Henshall & same), Part of Your World (The Little Mermaid, Carrie Grant), Bad Guys (Bugsy Malone, Jon Lee & David Grant), The Bare Necessities (The Jungle Book, Les Dennis & Joseph McManners), Tomorrow (Annie, Ruthie Henshall & company)
