= The Dentist =

1996 film by Brian Yuzna

- Theatrical release poster
- Directed by: Brian Yuzna
- Written by: Dennis Paoli; Stuart Gordon; Charles Finch
- Produced by: Pierre David
- Starring: Corbin Bernsen; Linda Hoffman
- Cinematography: Levie Isaacks
- Edited by: Christopher Roth
- Music by: Alan Howarth
- Production companies: Image Organization; Trimark Pictures
- Distributed by: Trimark Pictures
- Release dates: June 18, 1996 (Fantafestival); October 18, 1996 (U.S.)
- Running time: 92 minutes
- Country: United States
- Language: English

The Dentist is a 1996 American slasher film directed by Brian Yuzna and written by Dennis Paoli, Stuart Gordon, and Charles Finch. It stars Corbin Bernsen, Linda Hoffman, Earl Boen and Ken Foree. It follows a successful but mentally unstable dentist in Los Angeles who begins committing murder. It is the first installment in The Dentist film series, followed by The Dentist 2.

== Plot ==
Dr. Alan Feinstone is a Los Angeles dentist who, despite his professional success, quietly suffers from extreme obsessive–compulsive disorder and is preoccupied with cleanliness and perfection. On the day of his wedding anniversary, Alan discovers his wife Brooke is cheating on him with the poolman, Matt. After they finish, Alan retrieves his pistol and follows Matt in his car. He is led to Paula Roberts's house, a friend of Brooke's. Alan invents a story about a surprise party for Brooke and watches Paula invite Matt inside. Paula's dog attacks Alan, and he shoots it in self-defense. After returning to his car, he drives to work.

At his dental practice, Alan's first appointment goes poorly when he hallucinates a child patient having rotten teeth and accidentally stabs him. As Detective Gibbs investigates the death of Paula's dog, Alan sees his second patient, April Reign, a beauty queen. Alan hallucinates that she is his wife and, while she is unconscious, takes off her pantyhose and fondles her before attempting to strangle her. As she wakes, Alan snaps out of it and hides her pantyhose. Alan tells her manager, Steve Landers, that she is still dizzy from nitrous oxide. When Steve realizes what happened, he returns, punches Alan, and threatens a lawsuit. Alan ends the day early and sends his staff and patients home, including Sarah, a teenager who wants her braces removed.

Later that night, Brooke meets Alan in a new opera-themed room at his practice. After sedating her under the premise of cleaning her teeth, he pulls out her teeth and cuts off her tongue. Detective Gibbs and his partner Detective Sunshine arrive at Alan's house the next morning to ask him questions. After the policemen leave, Matt discovers Brooke, who is still alive but sedated. Alan stabs Matt to death.

Sarah and Paula are waiting for Alan at his practice. Alan sees Paula first, much to Sarah's disappointment. When Paula's conversation turns to how good a job Matt does for her, Alan overly-aggressively drills into her tooth, destroying it. His assistant, Jessica, questions what he is doing, and he snaps out of it. Alan asks Jessica to finish, but after he discovers she has sent Paula home, he fires Jessica. When she pulls out April's pantyhose and threatens to expose him, Alan kills her.

At the police station, Detective Sunshine discovers that the bullet pulled from Paula's dog only matches one gun in the area: Alan's. IRS agent Marvin Goldblum, using Alan's tax problems as leverage, extorts a free dental exam and a payout. Instead, Alan tortures him. Detective Sunshine and Detective Gibbs drive to the Feinstone house to question him further. Near the pool, they discover Matt's body. They quickly break into the house and find the mutilated Brooke, tied to the bed but still alive. Later, Alan's other assistant, Karen, finds Marvin still in the dental chair. Alan attacks her and then kills her by injecting a needle full of air into her jugular vein.

After Alan removes Sarah's braces, he imagines her teeth rotting. He pulls out his gun, but she escapes and hides in one of the dental rooms, where she finds the blood-soaked Marvin, who attacks Alan. When Alan recaptures her, Sarah hysterically promises to brush her teeth three times a day and never eat candy. Satisfied, Alan leaves. The two detectives arrive and rescue Sarah, but are too late to capture Alan.

They follow Alan to a university, where he teaches dentistry classes. Alan maniacally instructs all his students to pull their patients' teeth out. As he hallucinates and shoots a dental student that he mistakes for Matt, the detectives burst into the room, but Alan uses a hostage to escape. Eventually, he wanders into an auditorium where an opera singer is practicing. Enchanted, he watches her from behind. She transforms into Brooke, who laughs at him when he reaches out to touch her. Defeated, he falls to his knees and is arrested by the detectives.

Alan, now in a psychiatric hospital, is carted off to his regular dental appointment. The dentist working on him is revealed to be his toothless wife Brooke, who works violently on his mouth, drilling his teeth one by one before inserting lead into them.

== Cast ==
- Corbin Bernsen as Dr. Alan Feinstone
- Linda Hoffman as Brooke Feinstone
- Michael Stadvec as Matt
- Ken Foree as Detective Gibbs
- Tony Noakes as Detective Sunshine
- Molly Hagan as Jessica
- Patty Toy as Karen
- Jan Hoag as Candy Wittridge
- Virginya Keehne as Sarah Andrews (credited as "Virginia Keehne")
- Earl Boen as Marvin Goldblum
- Christa Sauls as April Reign
- Mark Ruffalo as Steve Landers
- Lise Simms as Paula Roberts
- Joanne Baron as Mrs. Saunders
- Brian McLaughlin as Jody
- Christopher Kriesa as Mr. Schaeffer
- Sal Viscuso as Matthew Zeigler
- Aixa Maldonado as Maria (deleted scenes)
- Betsy Monroe as Young Female
- Brian Yuzna as Attendant
- Michael Guerin as Student #1
- Shanna Igoe as Student #2 (credited as "Shanna Corinne")
- Michael E. Rodgers as Nervous Patient (credited as "Michael Rodgers")
- Diana Tash as Opera Singer

== Production ==
=== Development ===
Trimark Pictures producer Mark Amin came up with the concept of a slasher film about a dentist while having lunch with Brian Yuzna. Brent V. Friedman wrote the film's first script, which was to be about an alien orthodontist. This script was rejected by Amin, who did not want any fantastical or paranormal elements in the film, instead having it be about the fear of sitting in a dental chair. Stuart Gordon and Dennis Paoli pitched the project to producer Pierre David, and wrote a treatment where the dentist character, named Dr. Alan Feinstone, was to be "fastidious, a clean freak, very neurotic", as well as the opening scene where Alan discovers his wife Brooke Feinstone's affair with his poolman Matt. When the script was finished, Amin felt that it needed to be extended to take place over the course of two days. Charles Finch was brought on to rewrite the script, having the film begin with Alan at the psychiatric hospital as an unreliable narrator telling his story, which allowed for the film's events to be seen from the dentist's perspective. Gordon was initially set to direct the film, but was replaced with Yuzna. Yuzna also drew the film's storyboards.

To create Alan's psychology and get the accuracy in dentistry, the filmmakers visited actual dentist offices as research, where they asked staff members if they thought that a dentist could "do something absolutely crazy". The staff described dentists as "crazier than you could ever think", saying that they "are a king in their office". The kill scenes were influenced by Alfred Hitchcock's films.

=== Filming ===
Principal photography began on September 25, 1995 and ended on October 21, 1995. The Dentist was shot by Dennis Maloney (later replaced with Levie Isaacks) on a budget of $700,000 in 18-20 days. The film's "slightly overexposed" photography was intended to give it a crisp texture to differentiate it from other horror films that were "dark, and smoky, and colors", and to articulate Alan's obsession with cleanliness and dislike of filth. The film was initially set to be shot in Montreal. Filming locations included 115 North 1St Street (exterior dentist office), 1500 East Ave (when Dr. Alan Feinstone drives to work after killing Matt) and San Fernando Boulevard (when Alan drives by a police car) in Burbank, Pasadena City College (dental college and auditorium (a theater introduced to Yuzna by Isaacks)) in Pasadena, and a residential home (dentist home) and Front Street Studios (dentist office and dental white room) in Los Angeles.

Yuzna initially wanted to avoid making a slasher film, stating that he had never made a film before that "took place in bright lights" and had a "body count", since his other films did not focus on kills. Because of the film's low production budget, Yuzna had to contribute his own car to production, and give his credit card to the art department, who purchased furniture to use as props during shooting. A scene in which Maria, Alan and Brooke Feinstone's housekeeper, finds Matt's dead body, falls into the pool and drowns was filmed, but was cut.

=== Casting ===
Chevy Chase and Bruce Campbell were considered for the role of Dr. Alan Feinstone, but Corbin Bernsen was cast instead. Bernsen later called the film's script "brilliant", and described the role in a 2013 chat with The Dark Side Digital, "I went very deep into the zone, if you will, and I was not pleasant to be around. I was not good to go home to my family, and I sort of remember working with Brian [Yuzna] and having our arguments about it. To go to the place where Feinstone had to be — you could see the veins popping out of my head, and that was not something I could switch on and off. I couldn't go and socialise with the crew and people still come up to me and say, 'I was on The Dentist with you!' and I honestly don't remember them." Additional actors and actresses cast for the film included Linda Hoffman, Michael Stadvec, Ken Foree, Tony Noakes, Molly Hagan, Patty Toy, Jan Hoag, Virginya Keehne, Earl Boen, Christa Sauls, Mark Ruffalo, Lise Simms, Joanne Baron, Brian McLaughlin, Christopher Kriesa, Sal Viscuso, Aixa Maldonado, Betsy Monroe, Michael Guerin, Shanna Igoe, Michael E. Rodgers, Diana Tash, and Yuzna himself. The Dentist was Keehne's last film role.

=== Special effects ===
The special makeup effects were supervised by Anthony C. Ferrante and done by himself, Kevin Yagher, Mitchell J. Coughlin, Joshua Blyden, Rob Burman, Christopher Nelson, Michael Deak, Jessica Flannery, Jennifer McManus, Sam Greenmun, Patricia Gundlach, J.M. Logan, Kerry Gudjohnsen, Ken Rex, Todd Rex, Shelley Yustak, Jennifer Slinger, Michael Burnett, Shea Clayton, Steve Johnson, Randy Leong, Chris Yagher, and David P. Barton. The "oversized mouth" prop used in Dr. Alan Feinstone's hallucinations was designed by Logan, Yagher and Ken Rex in two days, with the teeth changed for the different characters. The effects for the oversized mouth were filmed with a wide angle lens. According to Ferrante, the production team visited dental surgeries to acquire real dentistry implements, which Ferrante described as "the most medieval stuff [they] could find". Greenmun provided the rotted teeth for two fantasy sequences and the severed tongue prop. The makeup effects for Brooke Feinstone after Alan removes her teeth were designed by Nelson, who had just finished his work on Demon Knight and wanted a chance to prove himself again. The effect in which Alan clamps Marvin Goldblum's mouth open unnaturally was achieved via a prosthetic mouth, tongue, and jaw that hid Earl Boen's chin, crafted by Ken Rex. A taxidermic goat was used as Paula Roberts' dead dog. The head was turned to avoid having the horns be visible, and stuffed with fake blood.

=== Soundtrack ===
The music score was composed in one weekend by Alan Howarth, who also did the foley and sound mixing. The "Dentist Theme" was inspired by "Siegfried's Funeral March" from Götterdämmerung by Richard Wagner, which was also used in the film.

== Release ==
The Dentist was released directly to television, premiering on HBO on October 18, 1996.

=== Critical response ===
As of January 2023, the internet review aggregator Rotten Tomatoes reports that 0% of 7 critics gave the film a positive review; the average rating is 2.9/10. Allmovie called it a subpar horror-comedy about dental anxiety that "adds nothing new to the mix besides over-the-top images of mouths being desecrated and queasy allusions to the alleged filthiness of oral sex". Alan Jones of the Radio Times called the film "both grisly and hilariously funny". TV Guide rated it 2 out of 4 stars and wrote, "In its state of Grand Guignol-overkill, this offbeat chiller is bound to offend those viewers who wish the offspring of Sam Raimi and Stuart Gordon would learn the use of filmmaking restraint."

=== Accolades ===
Anthony C. Ferrante won "Best Special Effects" at the 1996 Fantafestival for his work on The Dentist. The film also won the "Jury Grand Prize" at the 1996 Sweden Fantastic Film Festival. It was nominated but did not win "Best Film" at the 1996 Fantasporto.

=== Home media ===
Vidmark Entertainment released The Dentist on VHS on December 31, 1996. It was later released on DVD by Lionsgate on October 21, 1998. In January 2023, Vestron Video released the film for the first time on Blu-ray as part of their Vestron Video Collector's Series, in a two-disc set alongside the film's sequel.
