= Beach Clash =

- Created by: Bryan Taylor
- Presented by: David Hirsch with Alison Armitage
- Theme music composer: Garth Young; Treana Morris
- Country of origin: United States
- Original language: English

Production
- Running time: 60 minutes
- Production companies: Taylorvision; First Media Entertainment; All American Television

Original release
- Network: Syndication
- Release: September 19, 1994 – September 17, 1995

Beach Clash is a game show that aired in syndication from September 19, 1994, through September 17, 1995. The show was hosted by David Hirsch and Alison Armitage. Teams of one male player, one female player, and two "hardbodies" competed in beach-themed events in an attempt to win the season's grand prize of $10,000 and a Hawaiian vacation.

== Reception ==
The show was met with largely negative critical response, often being considered a poor copy of the then hugely popular game show American Gladiators.

The Dallas Morning News's television critic Ed Bark penned a negative review of the show, writing, "These competitions, ranging from Hill Climb to Beach Bout, are strictly Dullsville" and said "Hirsch's commentary is an ultimate case study in making something of absolutely nothing", while "Armitage's principal contribution is to giggle at his attempts to be a hardbody in mind, if not body". A.J. Jacobs of Entertainment Weekly said, "This T&A fest would make Aaron Spelling blush". Ken Tucker of Entertainment Weekly stated, "After all, what are shows like American Gladiators and Beach Clash if not genially decadent versions of overbuffed Greek gods and goddesses bulging and sweating for the amusement of us rabble?" Bother's Bar called it "one of many American Gladiators knock-offs that were popular in US syndication in the early to mid-90s (to make, it sounds like nobody actually watched half of them), this one’s set on a Californian beach (and nails that aesthetic to be fair) and has a pretty great theme tune featuring a bit of Eurodance and a warbling woman (“Beach Claaaaash!”) you just don’t get nowadays. [...] The games start off mildly Run-the-Gauntlety but aren’t all that great really (and in the case of the jetski races completely unfollowable), becoming a bit sub-It’s a Knockout but they are at least quite quick."
