= Christa Sauls =

American model and actress (born 1972)

- Born: April 15, 1972 (age 53); Kinston, North Carolina, U.S.
- Occupation(s): Model, actress

Christa Sauls (born April 15, 1972) is an American model and actress.

== Career ==
Sauls started her television career in the mid-1990s with roles in Step by Step and Baywatch Nights. In 1997 she appeared in the Conan series and had a lead role in the second season of Acapulco H.E.A.T.. In the late-1990s, she had appearances in L.A. Heat and Silk Stalkings and Beverly Hills, 90210. She has also had roles in several films including The Dentist in 1996.

== Filmography ==
=== Film ===
Year	Title	Role	Notes
1996	The Dentist	April Reign	
2003	Ghost Rock	Jasmine	
2005	Killing Cupid	Starfish	

=== Television ===
Year	Title	Role	Notes
1994	California Dreams	Maria	Episode: "Rebel Without a Nerve"
1994, 1995	Step by Step	Karen Covington	2 episodes
1996	Baywatch Nights	Marnie Morrow	Episode: "Heat Rays"
1997	L.A. Heat	Electra	Episode: "Electra"
1997	Conan the Adventurer	Tickle	Episode: "The Three Virgins"
1997	Silk Stalkings	Glory Newman	Episode: "If the Shoe Fits"
1998	Beverly Hills, 90210	Denise O'Lare	2 episodes
1998–1999	Acapulco H.E.A.T.	Joanna Barnes	26 episodes
2004	Las Vegas	Lone Sexy Woman	Episode: "The Night the Lights Went Out in Vegas"
