= Challenge of the Child Geniuses =

2000 American television series

- Genre: Game show
- Presented by: Dick Clark
- Narrated by: Mark Thompson
- Country of origin: United States
- Original language: English
- No. of seasons: 1
- No. of episodes: 2

Production
- Producer: Dick Clark Productions
- Running time: 120 minutes

Original release
- Network: Fox
- Release: May 2000 – November 2000

Challenge of the Child Geniuses (subtitled Who is the Smartest Kid in America?, also known as Battle of the Child Geniuses in TV promos) was a series of two Fox television specials aired in May and November 2000. Dick Clark hosted both specials and Mark Thompson announced. Both specials were produced by Dick Clark Productions. This was the last game show that Clark hosted in his lifetime.

== Format ==
40 or 50 child prodigies selected from a nationwide search competed for over $300,000 or $500,000 in cash and prizes.

The first round was a test of knowledge. Host Clark asked the kids a series of multiple-choice questions. For each question, the players had 10 seconds to lock in their answers on a keypad in front of them. Afterwards, Clark revealed the correct answer and the home audience saw percentages of the kids who correctly answered the question and those who did not.

After this round, the kids' scores on this round and the pre-show test were combined, and the 10 kids (16 kids in the November special) with the highest combined scores advanced to the next round. All others left with a personal handheld computer (and in the May special, a $500 savings bond).

=== May special ===
In round two (titled "Face-Off"), the 10 survivors from round one competed for twice at a time in a head-to-head knowledge test. Host Clark asked a question. Any time the kids knew the correct answer, they could ring in. If they correctly answered the question, they scored a point. If they were not correct or failed to answer within two seconds after ringing in, their opponent scored the point. First to score five points advanced to the next round. The fifth point could not be earned by default; if a player had four points and their opponent missed a question, the other player would get to hear the entire question before answering. The losing player left with a digital camera, the computer and the savings bond.

In round three (titled "One-on-One"), each of the 5 remaining players would individually answer a series of questions while their opponents were isolated off-stage. They had one minute to answer each question and may ask for multiple-choice options for a maximum of three questions. Each correct answer earned a point, but a third incorrect answer ended their round immediately. Correctly answering every question in a set awarded the player a $5,000 cash bonus. The three highest scorers would advance to the next round, while the others left with a 7-day family cruise vacation for four to Florida and the Bahamas in addition to the digital camera, the computer and the savings bond.

In the semi-final round, the three survivors would compete as a group. The kids were asked individual questions from categories randomly selected. Correct answers still earned a point. The first two challengers to reach five points advanced to the finals. The other received a trust fund valued at $50,000 in addition to the cruise trip, the digital camera, the computer and the savings bond.

In the finals, the two winners squared off against each other for the championship. The kids were asked a series of questions from six categories (Science, Math, Literature, History, Spelling, Geography), each one randomly selected. The difference was that correct answers scored nothing. The only way to score points was to correctly answer a question that their opponent missed. Doing so earned one point. The first to score five points won the top trust fund prize of $300,000 in addition to the cruise trip, the digital camera, the computer, the savings bond, and the title of "The Smartest Kid in America". The other finalist received a $100,000 trust fund in addition to the cruise trip, the digital camera, the computer and the savings bond.

=== November special ===
Rounds two through four were split into two heats, with each heat played during each of the two hours of the specials.

Round two ("Face-Off") was played similarly to the May special, with the 16 survivors from round one competed two at a time (eight in each hour). The required score to win was decreased to three points. The losing is player left with a digital camera in addition to the computer.

In round three, the eight survivors from round two competed as a group (four in each hour). The kids were asked individual questions from categories randomly selected. Correct answers still earned a point. The first two challengers to reach three points advanced to the semi-finals. The others left with a big screen television, the digital camera and the computer.

In the semi-final round, the four semi-finalists (two in each hour) competed for the right to play in the finals. The kids were asked different questions from six categories, each one randomly selected. A correct answer still earned a point. An incorrect answer or no answer meant the opponent could steal the point by correctly answering that same question. The first to reach five points advanced to the finals. The other player left with a $25,000 trust fund and a trip to Hawaii for four in addition to the big screen television, the digital camera and the computer.

In the finals, the two winners from each hour squared off against each other for the championship under the same rules from the May special. The first to score five points off of their opponent's missed questions won the top trust fund prize of $150,000 in addition to the trip to Hawaii, the big screen television, the digital camera, the computer, and the title of "The Smartest Kid in America". The other finalist received a $75,000 trust fund in addition to the trip to Hawaii, the big screen television, the digital camera and the computer.

== "The Smartest Kids in America" ==
- May 2000: Michael Jezierny
- November 2000: Andrew Turcich

== International versions ==
=== Indian version ===
India's Child Genius is an Indian game show based on the Fox format of the original American version. This show was hosted by Siddhartha Basu and broadcast on the Star World. The contest provided a platform for the brightest pre-teen academic achievers in the country, who were tested not just on general knowledge, but also on verbal and non-verbal reasoning, and subjects from their school curriculum that are aged 10–13. The special session of the show was filmed at the Rashtrapati Bhawan.

=== Italian version ===
Genius - Il campionato dei piccoli geni was the Italian version of the game show aired to Rete 4 and presented by Mike Bongiorno and Alessandro Cecchi Paone in the pilot episode.

=== Spanish version ===
Pequeños grandes genios was the Spanish version of the game show aired to La 1, presented by Carlos Larrañaga in the first edition and by Ángel Llàcer from 2002 to 2003.

Country	Name	Host	Network	Date premiered
India	India's Child Genius	Siddhartha Basu	Star World	2002–2004
Italy	Genius - Il campionato dei piccoli geni	Alessandro Cecchi Paone; Mike Bongiorno	Italia 1 Rete 4	2001; 2003–2006
Spain	Pequeños grandes genios	Carlos Larrañaga; Ángel Llàcer	La 1	2001–2003
