= Brendan Kelly =

Brendan Kelly may refer to:

- Brendan Kelly (musician) (born 1976), bassist/vocalist of The Lawrence Arms and guitarist/lead vocalist of The Falcon
- Brendan Kelly (actor) (born 1964), Irish-born actor and artist; played Wolfgang Cutler in the TV series Oz
- Brendan Kelly (bishop) (born 1946), Irish prelate of the Roman Catholic Church
- Brendan Kelly (hurler) (born 1968), Irish retired hurler
- Brendan F. Kelly, Director of the Illinois State Police (2019– )

== See also ==
- Brenden Kelley, American politician
