= Alison Armitage =

British actress and Playboy Playmate

Personal information
- Citizenship: Hong Kong; United States (from 2019)
- Born: 26 February 1965 (age 60)

Sport
- Sport: Swimming

Alison Armitage (26 February 1965, High Wycombe, England) is a British-born former swimmer, actress, model and Playboy Playmate who holds Hong Kong and US citizenship.

== Early life ==
Armitage was born in High Wycombe, England, but grew up in Hong Kong where she lived for 20 years. She is of mixed German, French, and English descent. Armitage has been a swimmer since the age of four, and qualified for the Hong Kong Olympic team. However, she abandoned the sport during her teens. Armitage studied at Island School in Hong Kong before studying computer science at the University of San Diego in California. She eventually started a career as a model.

== Playboy Playmate and modeling career ==
Brittany York

Personal details
- Born: 26 February 1965 (age 60) London, England
- Height: 5 ft 6 in (1.68 m)

Under the pseudonym Brittany York, Armitage was Playboy's Playmate of the Month for October 1990. As a result, she appeared in many Playboy videos and promotions. Armitage also appeared in a pictorial in Maxim magazine in 1999. Aside from that, she also appeared on the cover of other magazines like Razor, DT, and Bikini. Armitage was also featured in TV commercials for brands like Reebok Sportswear, West cigarettes, Budweiser, Trac mobile phones, among others.

== Acting career ==
Armitage started her acting career in the early 1990s with small roles on the TV show Full House and the film Miracle Beach. After that, she landed a leading role in the television series Acapulco H.E.A.T. from 1993 to 1994 and from 1996 to 1997. Armitage also appeared in popular TV shows like Seinfeld and the long-running soap opera The Bold and the Beautiful. She also had bit parts in movies such as Jerry Maguire and Driven.

== Filmography ==
=== Film ===
Year	Title	Role	Notes
1992	Secret Games	Nun	Straight-to-video
1992	Miracle Beach	Girl in Bed	credited as Brittany York
1996	Jerry Maguire	Former girlfriend	
1998	Franky Goes to Hollywood	Self	Short
2001	Driven	Girlfriend	Uncredited
2001	Raw Deal	Ms. Crowe	Short

=== Television ===
Year	Title	Role	Notes
1991	Posing: Inspired by Three Real Stories	Britany	Uncredited
1991	To Tell the Truth	Contestant	Season 1, episode 162, credited as Brittany York
1991	Into the Night	Self	Episode dated 2 May 1991
1991	Full House	Girl on bike	Episode: "Easy Rider"
1993-1994; 1998-1999	Acapulco H.E.A.T.	Catherine "Cat" Avery Pascal	Lead role (48 episodes)
1994	Thunder in Paradise	Shannon Daring	Episode: "Queen of Hearts"
1994	One West Waikiki	Stacy Holliday	Episode: "A Model for Murder"
1994-1995	Beach Clash	Host	
1995	Seinfeld	Cheryl	Episode: "The Jimmy"
1997	Silk Stalkings	Erin Kingston	Episode: "Fevers"
1998	The New Adventures of Robin Hood	Ariel Glister	Recurring role (5 episodes)
1999	L.A. Heat	Major Lauren Wylie	Episode: "Bad Reputation"
2001	Dark Realm	Sybil	Episode: "Murder One"
2001	Black Scorpion	Deputy Mayor Edwina Watts/Stunner	Episode: "Power Play"
2001	The Test	Self - Panelist	Episode: "The Neurotic Test"
2002	The Bold and the Beautiful	Monique	Season 15, episode 134
2003-2004	The Red Carpet	Co-host	
