= Bernadette Strachan =

English author

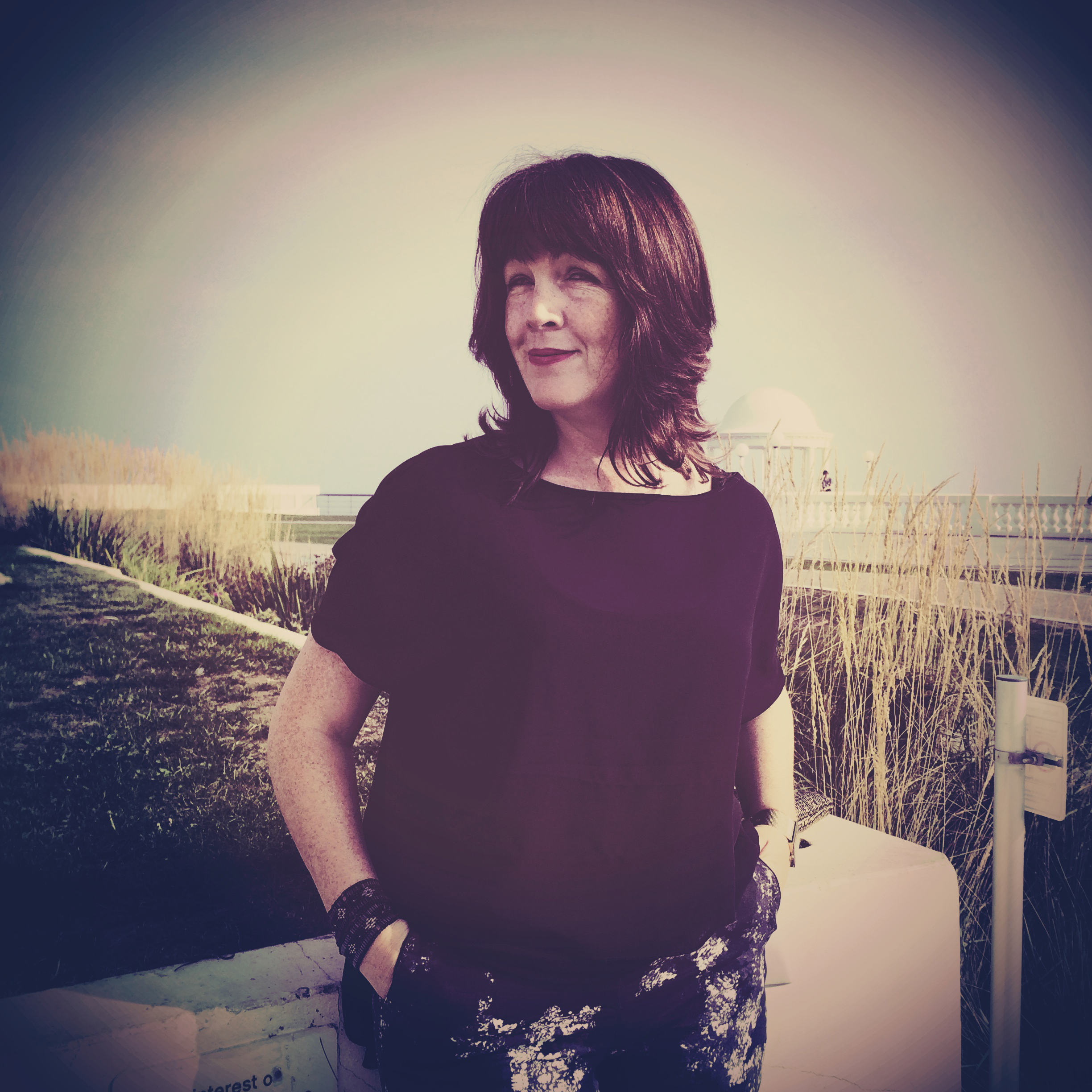
- Strachan in 2014
- Born: 27 December 1962 (age 63); Fulham, London, England
- Occupations: Novelist; short story writer; screenwriter; librettist
- Spouse: Matthew Strachan (m. 2001; died 2021)
- Writing career
- Pen name: Bernadette Strachan; Juliet Ashton; Claire Sandy; M. B. Vincent
- Period: 2002–present
- Genres: Romantic fiction; women's fiction; romantic comedy; crime thriller; musical theatre
- Website: berniestrachan.com

Bernadette Strachan (née Gaughan, born 27 December 1962) is an English author of popular women's fiction and among the more popular writers of "chick lit".

== Biography ==
Strachan was born in Fulham, London, into an Irish Catholic family. Her Irish background is often incorporated into her writing, particularly in the semi-autobiographical musical Next Door's Baby which was written for London's Orange Tree Theatre with Matthew Strachan. Prior to becoming an author, she worked in the media as a radio advertising producer and subsequently as an agent for voiceover artists.

Her first novel, The Reluctant Landlady, was published by Hodder & Stoughton in 2004. Since then she has published three further novels with the same publisher. In 2009, her fifth book, How to Lose a Husband and Gain a Life, followed in 2010 by Why Do We Have to Live with Men?, were both published by Little, Brown. In 2013, her seventh novel, The Valentine's Card, was published by Little, Brown, under the pseudonym of Juliet Ashton.

She has written a further three novels as Juliet Ashton for Simon & Schuster and four novels as Claire Sandy for Pan Macmillan. She also writes screen and theatre works under her maiden name of Bernie Gaughan. In 2017, Simon & Schuster announced that Strachan would be writing a crime thriller series with her composer husband Matthew Strachan under the pseudonym of M. B. Vincent.

== Bibliography ==
- The Reluctant Landlady (2004)
- Handbags and Halos (2005)
- Diamonds and Daisies (2007)
- Little White Lies (2008)
- How to Lose a Husband and Gain a Life (2009)
- Why Do We Have to Live with Men? (2010)
- The Valentine's Card (2013)
- What Would Mary Berry Do? (2014)
- A Very Big House in the Country (2015)
- Snowed in for Christmas (2015)
- These Days of Ours (2016)
- A Not Quite Perfect Family (2017)
- The Woman at Number 24 (2017)
- The Sunday Lunch Club (2018)
- Jess Castle and the Eyeballs of Death (2018)

== Theatre Works ==
- Next Door's Baby (2006)
- About Bill (2011)
