= Dick Clark =

American radio and television personality (1929–2012)

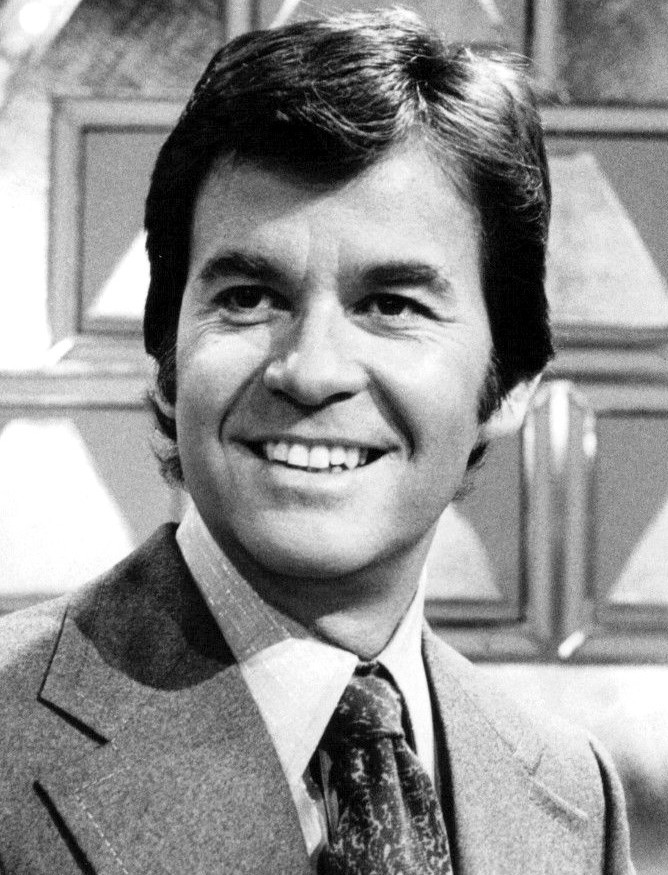
- Clark in 1974 on the set of The $10,000 Pyramid
- Born: Richard Wagstaff Clark; November 30, 1929; Bronxville, New York, U.S.
- Died: April 18, 2012 (aged 82); Santa Monica, California, U.S.
- Education: Syracuse University
- Occupations: Television presenter; radio personality; businessman; television producer
- Years active: 1945–2012
- Organization: Dick Clark Productions
- Known for: American Bandstand; Pyramid; Dick Clark's New Year's Rockin' Eve
- Spouses: Barbara Mallery (m. 1952; div. 1961) Loretta Martin (m. 1962; div. 1971) Kari Wigton (m. 1977)
- Children: 3, including Duane
- Awards: Full list

Richard Wagstaff Clark (November 30, 1929 – April 18, 2012) was an American television and radio personality and television producer who hosted American Bandstand from 1956 to 1989. He also hosted five incarnations of the Pyramid game show from 1973 to 1988 and Dick Clark's New Year's Rockin' Eve, which broadcast New Year's Eve celebrations in New York City's Times Square.

As host of American Bandstand, Clark introduced rock and roll to many Americans. The show gave many new music artists their first exposure to national audiences, including the Supremes, Ike & Tina Turner, Smokey Robinson and the Miracles, Stevie Wonder, Simon & Garfunkel, Iggy Pop, Prince, Talking Heads and Madonna. Episodes he hosted were among the first in which black people and white people performed on the same stage, and they were among the first in which the live studio audience sat down together without racial segregation. Singer Paul Anka claimed that Bandstand was responsible for creating a "youth culture". Due to his perennially youthful appearance and his largely teenaged audience of American Bandstand, Clark was often referred to as "America's oldest teenager" or "the world's oldest teenager".

In his off-stage roles, Clark was chief executive officer of Dick Clark Productions (though he sold his financial interest in the company during his later years). He also founded the American Bandstand Diner, a restaurant chain themed after the television program of the same name. In 1973, he created and produced the annual American Music Awards show, similar to the Grammy Awards.

== Early life ==
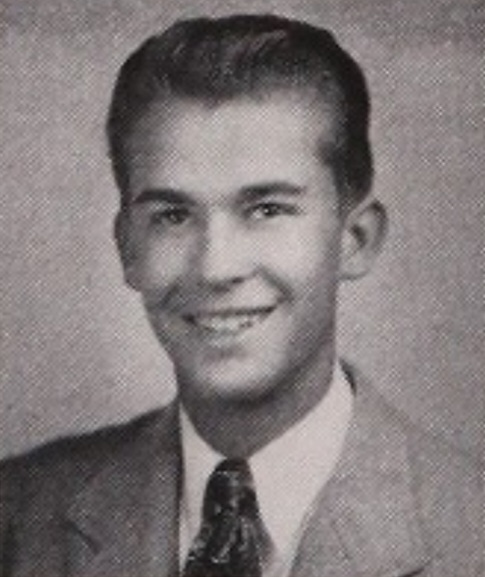
Clark in the 1947 yearbook for A.B. Davis High School

Clark was born on November 30, 1929, in Bronxville, New York, a suburb of New York City. He was raised in neighboring Mount Vernon, the second child of Richard Augustus Clark and Julia Fuller Clark, née Barnard. His only sibling, elder brother Bradley, a World War II P-47 Thunderbolt pilot, was killed in the Battle of the Bulge.

Clark attended Mount Vernon's A.B. Davis High School (later renamed A.B. Davis Middle School), where he was an average student. At the age of 10, Clark decided to pursue a career in radio. In pursuit of that goal, he attended Syracuse University, graduating in 1951 with a degree in advertising and a minor in radio. While at Syracuse, he was a member of Delta Kappa Epsilon fraternity (Phi Gamma).

== Radio and television career ==
In 1945, Clark began his career working in the mailroom at WRUN, an AM radio station in Utica, New York, that was owned by his uncle and managed by his father. Almost immediately, he was asked to fill in for the vacationing weatherman and, within a few months, he was announcing station breaks.

While attending Syracuse, Clark worked at WOLF-AM, then a country music station. After graduation, he returned to WRUN for a short time where he went by the name Dick Clay. After that, Clark got a job at the television station WKTV in Utica, New York. His first television-hosting job was on Cactus Dick and the Santa Fe Riders, a country-music program. He later replaced Robert Earle (who later hosted the GE College Bowl) as a newscaster.

In addition to his announcing duties on radio and television, Clark owned several radio stations. From 1964 to 1978, he owned KPRO (now KFOO) in Riverside, California under the name Progress Broadcasting. In 1967, he purchased KGUD-AM-FM (now KTMS and KTYD, respectively) in Santa Barbara, California.

=== American Bandstand ===
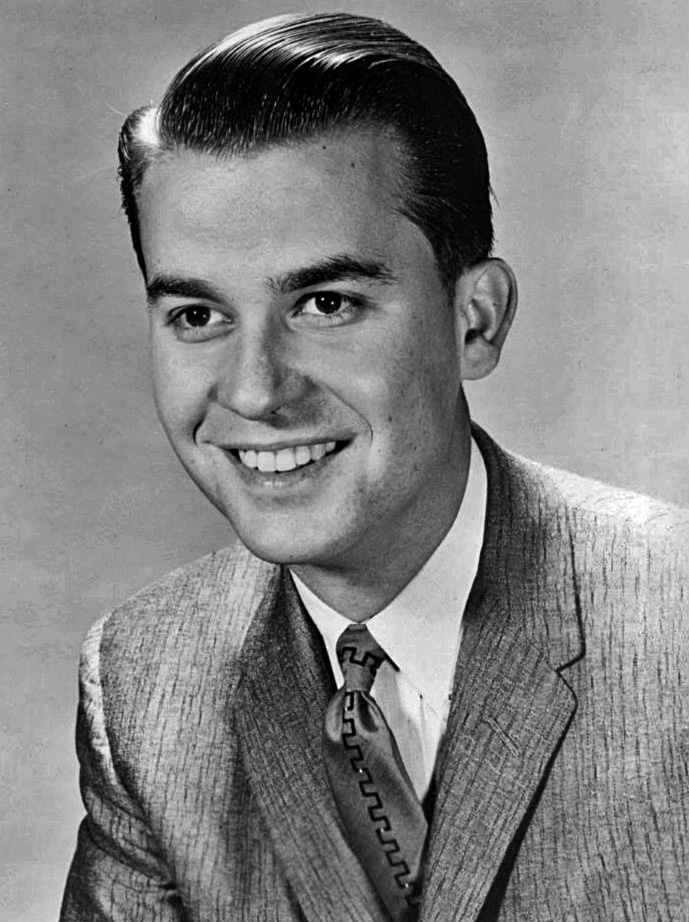
Clark in 1961

In 1952, Clark moved to Drexel Hill, Pennsylvania, a section of Upper Darby just outside of Philadelphia, where he took a job as a disc jockey at radio station WFIL, adopting the Dick Clark handle. WFIL had an affiliated television station (now WPVI) with the same call sign, which began broadcasting a show called Bob Horn's Bandstand in 1952. Clark was responsible for a similar program on the company's radio station and was a regular substitute host when Horn went on vacation. In 1956, Horn was arrested for drunk driving and was subsequently dismissed. On July 9, 1956, Clark became the show's permanent host.

Bandstand was picked up by the ABC television network, renamed American Bandstand, and debuted nationally on August 5, 1957. The show took off, due to Clark's natural rapport with the live teenage audience and dancing participants as well as the "clean-cut, non-threatening image" he projected to television audiences. As a result, many parents were introduced to rock and roll music. According to Hollywood producer Michael Uslan, "he was able to use his unparalleled communication skills to present rock 'n roll in a way that was palatable to parents." James Sullivan of Rolling Stone stated that "Without Clark, rock & roll in its infancy would have struggled mightily to escape the common perception that it was just a passing fancy."

In 1958, The Dick Clark Show was added to ABC's Saturday night lineup. By the end of year, viewership exceeded 20 million, and featured artists were "virtually guaranteed" large sales boosts after appearing. In a surprise television tribute to Clark in 1959 on This Is Your Life, host Ralph Edwards called him "America's youngest starmaker", and estimated the show had an audience of 50 million.

Clark moved the show from Philadelphia to Los Angeles in 1964. The move was related to the popularity of new "surf" groups based in southern California, including The Beach Boys and Jan and Dean. After moving to Los Angeles, the show became more diverse and featured more minorities. The show was notable for promoting desegregation in popular music and entertainment by prominently featuring black musicians and dancers. Prior to this point, the show had largely excluded black teenagers.

The show ran daily Monday through Friday until 1963, then weekly on Saturdays until 1988. Bandstand was briefly revived in 1989, with David Hirsch taking over hosting duties. By the time of its cancellation, the show had become the longest-running variety show in TV history.

In the 1960s, the show's emphasis changed from merely playing records to including live performers. During this period, many of the leading rock bands and artists of the 1960s had their first exposure to nationwide audiences. A few of the many artists introduced were The Supremes, Ike and Tina Turner, Smokey Robinson and the Miracles, The Beach Boys, Stevie Wonder, Prince, Simon and Garfunkel, Jerry Lee Lewis, Buddy Holly, Bobby Fuller, Johnny Cash, Sam Cooke, Fats Domino and Chubby Checker.

During an interview with Clark by Henry Schipper of Rolling Stone magazine in 1990, it was noted that "over two-thirds of the people who've been initiated into the Rock and Roll Hall of Fame had their television debuts on American Bandstand, and the rest of them probably debuted on other shows [they] produced." During the show's lifetime, it featured over 10,000 live performances, many by artists who were unable to appear anywhere else on TV, as the variety shows during much of this period were "antirock". Schipper points out that Clark's performers were shocking to general audiences:

The music establishment, and the adults in general, really hated rock and roll. Politicians, ministers, older songwriters and musicians foamed at the mouth. Frank Sinatra reportedly called Elvis Presley a "rancid-smelling aphrodisiac".

Clark was therefore considered to have a negative influence on youth and was well aware of that impression held by most adults:

I was roundly criticized for being in and around rock and roll music at its inception. It was the devil's music, it would make your teeth fall out and your hair turn blue, whatever the hell. You get through that.

In 2002, many of the bands he introduced appeared at the 50th anniversary special to celebrate American Bandstand. Clark noted during the special that American Bandstand was listed in the Guinness Book of Records as "the longest-running variety show in TV history." In 2010, American Bandstand and Clark himself were honored at the Daytime Emmy Awards. Hank Ballard, who wrote "The Twist", described Clark's popularity during the early years of American Bandstand:

The man was big. He was the biggest thing in America at that time. He was bigger than the president!

As a result of Clark's work on Bandstand, journalist Ann Oldenburg states "he deserves credit for doing something bigger than just putting on a show." Los Angeles Times writer Geoff Boucher goes further, stating that "with the exception of Elvis Presley, Clark was considered by many to be the person most responsible for the bonfire spread of rock 'n roll across the country in the late 1950s", making Clark a "household name". He became a "primary force in legitimizing rock 'n' roll", adds Uslan. Clark, however, simplified his contribution:

I played records, the kids danced, and America watched.

Shortly after becoming its host, Clark also ended the show's all-white policy by featuring black artists such as Chuck Berry. In time, blacks and whites performed on the same stage, and studio seating was desegregated. Beginning in 1959 and continuing into the mid-1960s, Clark produced and hosted the Caravan of Stars, a series of concert tours built upon the success of American Bandstand, which by 1959 had a national audience of 20 million. However, Clark was unable to host Elvis Presley, the Beatles or the Rolling Stones on either of his programs.

The reason for Clark's impact on popular culture has been partially explained by Paul Anka, a singer who appeared on the show early in his career: "This was a time when there was no youth culture—he created it. And the impact of the show on people was enormous." In 1990, a couple of years after the show had been off the air, Clark considered his personal contribution to the music he helped introduce:

My talent is bringing out the best in other talent, organizing people to showcase them and being able to survive the ordeal. I hope someday that somebody will say that in the beginning stages of the birth of the music of the fifties, though I didn't contribute in terms of creativity, I helped keep it alive.

=== Payola hearings ===
In 1960, the United States Senate investigated payola, the practice of music-producing companies paying broadcasting companies to favor their product. As a result, Clark's personal investments in music publishing and recording companies were considered a conflict of interest, and he sold his shares in those companies. This also included the "roughly 150 pop songs from which he earned royalties as a credited 'songwriter.'"

When asked about some of the causes for the hearings, Clark speculated about some of the contributing factors not mentioned by the press:

Politicians ... did their damnedest to respond to the pressures they were getting from parents and publishing companies and people who were being driven out of business [by rock]. ... It hit a responsive chord with the electorate, the older people. ... they full-out hated the music. [But] it stayed alive. It could've been nipped in the bud, because they could've stopped it from being on television and radio.

As reported by a New York Times Magazine interview with Dick Clark, Gene Shalit was Clark's press agent in the early 1960s. Shalit reportedly "stopped representing" Clark during the Congressional investigation of payola. Clark never spoke to Shalit again, and referred to him as a "jellyfish".

=== Game show host ===
Beginning in late 1963, Clark branched out into hosting game shows, presiding over The Object Is. The show was canceled in 1964 and replaced by Missing Links, which had moved from NBC. Clark took over as host, replacing Ed McMahon.

Clark became the first host of The $10,000 Pyramid, which premiered on CBS March 26, 1973. The show—a word-association game created and produced by daytime television producer Bob Stewart—moved to ABC in 1974. Over the coming years, the top prize changed several times (and with it the name of the show), and several primetime spinoffs were created.

As the program moved back to CBS in September 1982, Clark continued to host the daytime version through most of its history, winning three Emmy Awards for best game show host. In total, Pyramid won nine Emmy Awards for best game show during his run, a mark that is eclipsed only by the twelve won by the syndicated version of Jeopardy!. Clark's final Pyramid hosting gig, The $100,000 Pyramid, ended in 1988.

Clark subsequently returned to Pyramid as a guest in later incarnations. During the premiere of the John Davidson version in 1991, Clark sent a pre-recorded message wishing Davidson well in hosting the show. In 2002, Clark played as a celebrity guest for three days on the Donny Osmond version. Earlier, he was also a guest during the Bill Cullen version of The $25,000 Pyramid, which aired simultaneously with Clark's daytime version of the show.

Entertainment Weekly credited Clark's "quietly commanding presence" as a major factor in the game show's success.

Clark hosted the syndicated television game show The Challengers, during its only season (1990–91). The Challengers was a co-production between the production companies of Dick Clark and Ron Greenberg. During the 1990–91 season, Clark and Greenberg also co-produced a revival of Let's Make a Deal for NBC with Bob Hilton as the host. Hilton was later replaced by original host Monty Hall. Clark later hosted Scattergories on NBC in 1993; and The Family Channel's version of It Takes Two in 1997. In 1999, along with Bob Boden, he was one of the executive producers of Fox's TV game show Greed, which ran from November 5, 1999, to July 14, 2000, and was hosted by Chuck Woolery. At the same time, Clark also hosted the Stone-Stanley-created Winning Lines, which ran for six weeks on CBS from January 8 through February 12, 2000, Geraldo Rivera was actually supposed to host Winning Lines but couldn't agree on the contract, so CBS selected Clark to host.

He concluded his game show hosting career with another of his productions, Challenge of the Child Geniuses, a series of two two-hour specials broadcast on Fox in May and November 2000.

=== Dick Clark's New Year's Rockin' Eve ===
In 1972, Dick Clark first produced New Year's Rockin' Eve, a New Year's Eve music special for NBC which included coverage of the ball drop festivities in New York City. Clark aimed to challenge the dominance of Guy Lombardo's New Year's specials on CBS, as he believed its big band music was too dated. After two years on NBC—during which the show was hosted by Three Dog Night and George Carlin, respectively—the program moved to ABC, and Clark assumed hosting duties. Following Lombardo's death in 1977, Rockin' Eve experienced a surge in popularity and later became the most-watched annual New Year's Eve broadcast. Clark also was a special correspondent for ABC News's ABC 2000 Today broadcast, covering the arrival of 2000.

Following his stroke (which prevented him from appearing at all on the 2004–05 edition), Clark returned to make brief appearances on the 2005–06 edition while ceding the majority of hosting duties to Ryan Seacrest. Reaction to Clark's appearance was mixed. While some TV critics (including Tom Shales of The Washington Post, in an interview with the CBS Radio Network) felt that he was not in good enough shape to do the broadcast, stroke survivors and many of Clark's fans praised him for being a role model for people dealing with post-stroke recovery. Seacrest remained host and an executive producer of the special, assuming full duties after Clark's death.

=== Radio programs ===
Clark's first love was radio and, in 1963, he began hosting a radio program called The Dick Clark Radio Show. It was produced by Mars Broadcasting of Stamford. Despite Clark's enormous popularity on American Bandstand, the show was only picked up by a few dozen stations and lasted less than a year.

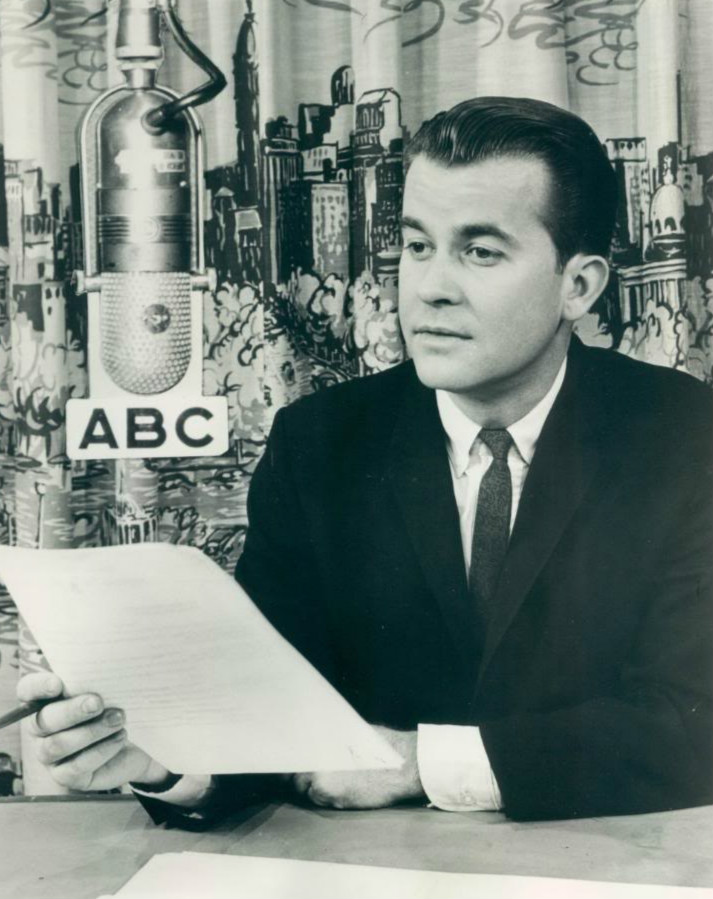
Photo of Clark in 1963, pictured with the iconic RCA 77-DX microphone. Clark's ABC radio show was called Dick Clark Reports.

On March 25, 1972, Clark hosted American Top 40, filling in for Casey Kasem. In 1981, he created The Dick Clark National Music Survey for the Mutual Broadcasting System. The program counted down the top 30 contemporary hits of the week in direct competition with American Top 40. Clark left Mutual in October 1985, and Bill St. James (and later Charlie Tuna) took over the National Music Survey. Clark's United Stations purchased RKO Radio Network in 1985 and, when Clark left Mutual, he began hosting USRN's "Countdown America" which continued until 1995.

In 1982, Clark launched his own radio syndication group with partners Nick Verbitsky and Ed Salamon called the United Stations Radio Network. That company later merged with the Transtar Network to become Unistar. In 1994, Unistar was sold to Westwood One Radio. The following year, Clark and Verbitsky started over with a new version of the USRN, bringing into the fold Dick Clark's Rock, Roll & Remember, written and produced by Pam Miller (who also came up with the line used in the show and later around the world: "the soundtrack of our lives"), and a new countdown show: The U.S. Music Survey, produced by Jim Zoller. Clark was its host until his December 2004 stroke. United Stations Radio Networks continues in operation as of 2026, as United Stations Media Network.

Dick Clark's longest-running radio show began on February 14, 1982. Dick Clark's Rock, Roll & Remember was a four-hour oldies show named after Clark's 1976 autobiography. The first year, it was hosted by veteran Los Angeles disc jockey Gene Weed. Then in 1983, voiceover talent Mark Elliot co-hosted with Clark. By 1985, Clark hosted the entire show. Pam Miller wrote the program and Frank Furino was producer. Each week, Clark profiled a different artist from the rock and roll era and counted down the top four songs that week from a certain year in the 1950s, 1960s or early 1970s. The show ended production when Clark suffered his December 2004 stroke. Reruns from the 1995–2004 era continued to air in syndication until USRN withdrew the show in 2020.

=== Other television programs ===
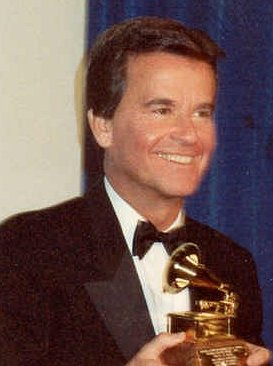
Clark in 1990

At the peak of his American Bandstand fame, Clark also hosted a 30-minute Saturday night program called The Dick Clark Show (aka The Dick Clark Saturday Night Beech-Nut Show). It aired from 15 February 1958, until 10 September 1960, on the ABC television network. It was broadcast live from the "Little Theater" in New York City and was sponsored by Beech-Nut gum. It featured the rock and roll stars of the day lip-synching their hits, just as on American Bandstand. However, unlike the afternoon Bandstand program, which focused on the dance floor with the teenage audience demonstrating the latest dance steps, the audience of The Dick Clark Show sat in a traditional theater setting. While some of the musical numbers were presented simply, others were major production numbers. The high point of the show was Clark's unveiling, with great fanfare at the end of each program, of the top ten records of the previous week. This ritual became so embedded in American culture that it was imitated in many media and contexts, which in turn were satirized nightly by David Letterman on his own Top Ten lists.

From 27 September to December 20, 1959, Clark hosted a 30-minute weekly talent/variety series titled Dick Clark's World of Talent at 10:30 p.m. Sundays on ABC. A variation of producer Irving Mansfield's earlier CBS series, This Is Show Business (1949–1956), it featured three celebrity panelists, including comedian Jack E. Leonard, judging and offering advice to amateur and semi-professional performers. While this show was not a success during its nearly three-month duration, Clark was one of the few personalities in television history on the air nationwide seven days a week.

One of Clark's guest appearances was in the final episode of the original Perry Mason TV series, entitled "The Case of the Final Fade-Out" playing a character named "Leif Early" in a show that satirized the show business industry. He was the murderer. He appeared as a drag-racing-strip owner in a 1973 episode of the procedural drama series Adam-12.

Clark appeared in an episode of Police Squad!, in which he asks an underworld contact about ska and obtains skin cream to keep himself looking young.

Clark attempted to branch into the realm of soul music with the series Soul Unlimited in 1973. The series, hosted by Buster Jones, was a more risqué and controversial imitator of the popular series Soul Train and alternated in the Bandstand time slot. The series lasted for only a few episodes. Despite a feud between Clark and Soul Train creator and host Don Cornelius, the two men later collaborated on several specials featuring black artists.

Clark hosted the short-lived Dick Clark's Live Wednesday in 1978 for NBC. In 1980, Clark was host of the short-lived series The Big Show, an unsuccessful attempt by NBC to revive the variety show format of the 1950s/'60s. In 1984, Clark produced and hosted the NBC series TV's Bloopers & Practical Jokes with co-host Ed McMahon. Clark and McMahon were longtime Philadelphia acquaintances, and McMahon praised Clark for first bringing him together with future TV partner Johnny Carson when all three worked at ABC in the late 1950s. The Bloopers franchise stemmed from the Clark-hosted (and produced) NBC Bloopers specials of the early 1980s, inspired by the books, record albums and appearances of Kermit Schafer, a radio and TV producer who first popularized outtakes of broadcasts. For a period of several years in the 1980s, Clark simultaneously hosted regular programs on all three major American television networks—ABC (Bandstand), CBS (Pyramid) and NBC (Bloopers).

In July 1985, Clark hosted the ABC primetime portion of the historic Live Aid concert, an all star concert designed by Bob Geldof to end world hunger. During the 1988 Writers Guild of America strike, Clark (as host and producer) filled in a void on CBS' fall schedule with Live! Dick Clark Presents.

Clark also hosted various pageants from 1988 to 1993 on CBS. He did a brief stint as announcer on The Jon Stewart Show in 1995. Two years later, he hosted the Pennsylvania Lottery 25th Anniversary Game Show special with then-Miss Pennsylvania Gigi Gordon for Jonathan Goodson Productions. He also created and hosted two Fox television specials in 2000 called Challenge of the Child Geniuses, the last game show he hosted.

From 2001 to 2003, Clark was a co-host of The Other Half with Mario Lopez, Danny Bonaduce and Dorian Gregory, a syndicated daytime talk show intended to be the male equivalent of The View. Clark also produced the television series American Dreams about a Philadelphia family in the early 1960s whose daughter is a regular on American Bandstand. The series ran from 2002 to 2005.

=== Other media appearances ===
Clark wrote, produced and starred in the 1968 film Killers Three, a Western drama that was a promotional vehicle for Bakersfield country musicians Merle Haggard and Bonnie Owens.

In 1967, Clark made an appearance in the Batman television series. Clark also appears in interview segments of a 2002 film, Confessions of a Dangerous Mind, which was based on the "unauthorized autobiography" of Chuck Barris, who had worked at ABC as a standards-and-practices executive during American Bandstand's run on that network.

In the 2002 Dharma & Greg episode "Mission: Implausible", Greg is the victim of a college prank, and he devises an elaborate plan to retaliate, part of which involves his use of a disguise kit; the first disguise chosen is that of Dick Clark. During a fantasy sequence that portrays the unfolding of the plan, the real Clark plays Greg wearing his disguise.

He also made brief cameos in two episodes of The Fresh Prince of Bel-Air. In one episode he plays himself at a Philadelphia diner, and in the other he helps Will Smith's character host bloopers from past episodes of that sitcom.

With Ed McMahon, Clark was a spokesman for American Family Sweepstakes until he quit over controversy from the company regarding their sales techniques. Though McMahon continued until the company went out of business, Clark's previous involvement in the Payola scandal motivated him to be sensitive about his public image.

== Business ventures ==
Dick Clark's AB Grill in Branson, Missouri (October 2007)

In 1965, Clark branched out from hosting, producing Where the Action Is, an afternoon television program shot at different locations every week featuring house band Paul Revere and the Raiders. In 1973, Clark began producing the highly successful American Music Awards. In 1987, Dick Clark Productions went public. Clark remained active in television and movie production into the 1990s.

Clark had a stake in a chain of music-themed restaurants licensed under the names "Dick Clark's American Bandstand Grill", "Dick Clark's AB Grill", "Dick Clark's Bandstand – Food, Spirits & Fun" and "Dick Clark's AB Diner". There are currently two airport locations in Newark, New Jersey and Phoenix, Arizona; one location in the Molly Pitcher Service Area on the New Jersey Turnpike in Cranbury, New Jersey; and one location at "Dick Clark's American Bandstand Theater" in Branson, Missouri. Until recently, Salt Lake City, Utah had an airport location. Other restaurants that have closed were located in King of Prussia (Pennsylvania); Miami; Columbus; Cincinnati; Indianapolis; and Overland Park (Kansas).

"Dick Clark's American Bandstand Theater" opened in Branson in April 2006, and nine months later, a new theater and restaurant titled "Dick Clark's American Bandstand Music Complex" opened near Dolly Parton's Dollywood theme park in Pigeon Forge, Tennessee.

From 1979 to 1980, Clark reportedly owned the former Westchester Premier Theatre in Greenburgh, New York, renaming it the Dick Clark Westchester Theatre.

== Personal life ==
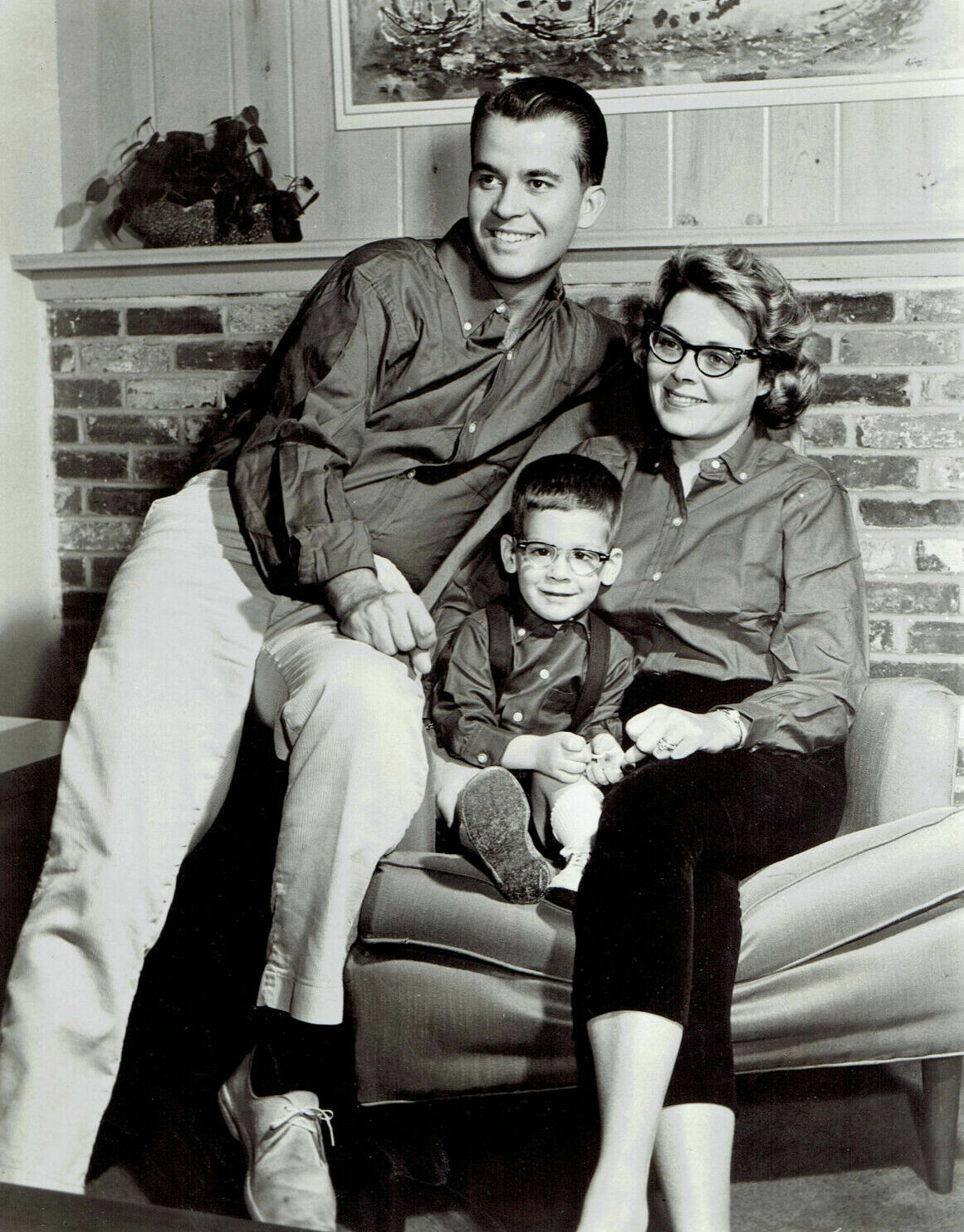
Clark with his first wife Barbara Mallery, and son Richard A. Clark, pictured 1960

Clark was the son of Richard A. Clark, who managed WRUN radio in Utica, New York.

He was married three times. His first marriage was to Barbara Mallery in 1952; the couple had one son, Richard A. Clark, and divorced in 1961. He married Loretta Martin in 1962; the couple had two children, Duane and Cindy, and divorced in 1971. His third marriage, to Kari Wigton, whom he married in 1977, lasted until his death. He also had three grandchildren.

== Illness and death ==
During an interview on Larry King Live in April 2004, Clark revealed that he had type 2 diabetes. His death certificate noted that Clark had coronary artery disease at the time of his death.

On December 6, 2004, Clark was hospitalized in Los Angeles after suffering what was initially termed a minor stroke. Although he was expected to be treated without any serious complications, it was later announced that Clark would be unable to host his annual New Year's Rockin' Eve broadcast, with Regis Philbin filling in for him. Clark returned to the series the following year, but the dysarthria that resulted from the stroke rendered him unable to speak clearly for the remainder of his life.

On April 18, 2012, Clark died from a heart attack at a hospital in Santa Monica, California, at the age of 82, shortly after undergoing a transurethral resection procedure to treat an enlarged prostate. After his estate obtained the necessary environmental permits, he was cremated on April 20 and his ashes were scattered over the Pacific Ocean.

== Legacy ==
Following Clark's death, longtime friend and House Rules Committee Chairman David Dreier eulogized Clark on the floor of the U.S. Congress. President Barack Obama praised Clark's career: "With American Bandstand, he introduced decades' worth of viewers to the music of our times. He reshaped the television landscape forever as a creative and innovative producer. And, of course, for 40 years, we welcomed him into our homes to ring in the New Year." Motown founder Berry Gordy and singer Diana Ross spoke of Clark's impact on the recording industry: "Dick was always there for me and Motown, even before there was a Motown. He was an entrepreneur, a visionary and a major force in changing pop culture and ultimately influencing integration," Gordy said. "He presented Motown and the Supremes on tour with the "Caravan of Stars" and on American Bandstand, where I got my start," Ross said.

== Credits ==
=== Filmography ===
- Jamboree (1957) – Himself
- Because They're Young (1960) – Neil Hendry
- The Young Doctors (1961) – Dr. Alexander
- Killers Three (1968) – Roger
- Psych-Out (1968) – producer
- The Phynx (1970) – Himself
- Spy Kids (2001) – Financier
- Bowling For Columbine (2002) – Himself (Documentary)

=== Television ===
- ABC 2000 Today – Times Square correspondent
- Adam-12 (1972) – as drag strip owner Mr. J. Benson in the season 4 episode "Who Won?"
- American Bandstand – host
- Branded – guest-starred as J.A. Bailey in season 2 episode "The Greatest Coward on Earth"
- Burke's Law – as Peter Barrows, the son of a murdered financier in season 1 episode "Who Killed What His Name?"
- Coronet Blue – guest-starred as Victor Brunswick in the episode "The Flip Side of Timmy Devon"
- The Challengers – host
- The Chamber – producer
- Friends (1994) – himself, season 1, episode 10, "The One with the Monkey"
- Futurama – himself (as a head in a jar), season 1, episode 1, "Space Pilot 3000"
- Greed – producer
- Happening (1968–69) – producer
- It Takes Two (1997) – host
- The Krypton Factor (1981) – host
- Lassie (1966) – as J.H. Alpert in the episode "The Untamed Land"
- Missing Links (1964) – host
- Miss Teen USA (1988, 1991–1993) – host
- Miss Universe (1990–1993) – host
- Miss USA (1989–1993) – host
- Final Draw: 1994 FIFA World Cup (1993) – host
- New Year's Rockin' Eve (1972–2004) – host, (2006–2012) – co-host, producer
- Perry Mason, (1966) Season 9, episode 30, "The Case of the Final Fadeout"
- The Object Is (1963–1964) – host
- The Other Half (2001-2003)- host
- The Partridge Family, guest star, season 1, episode 13, Star Quality
- Pyramid – host (1973–1988), guest (The $25,000 Pyramid, 1970s; Pyramid, 2002)
- The Saturday Night Beech-Nut Show (1958–1960) – host
- Scattergories – host
- The Simpsons – himself, in the "Treehouse of Horror X" segment, Life's a Glitch, Then You Die
- Stoney Burke (1963) – Sgt. Andy Kincaid in the episode "Kincaid"
- TV's Bloopers & Practical Jokes – co-host, producer
- Where the Action Is (1965–67) – host
- Police Squad! – himself, episode "Testimony of Evil (Dead Men Don't Laugh)"
- Wolf Rock TV – producer
- Winning Lines – host
- The Fresh Prince of Bel-Air – himself (two episodes)

=== Music videos ===
Year	Artist	Title	Role
1994	Pam Tillis	"When You Walk in the Room"	American Bandstand host
1995	Soul for Real	"If You Want It"	American Bandstand host

== Albums ==
- Dick Clark, 20 Years of Rock N' Roll (Buddah Records) (1973) (#9 Canada)
- Rock, Roll & Remember, Vol. 1,2,3 (CSP) (1983)
- Dick Clark Presents Radio's Uncensored Bloopers (Atlantic) (1984)

== Awards and honors ==
Television

- Five Emmy Awards
  - Four for Best Game Show Host (1979, 1983, 1985, and 1986)
  - Daytime Emmy Lifetime Achievement Award (1994)
- Peabody Award (1999)

Halls of Fame

- Hollywood Walk of Fame (1976)
- National Radio Hall of Fame (1990)
- Broadcasting Magazine Hall of Fame (1992)
- Broadcast Pioneers of Philadelphia Hall of Fame (1992)
- Television Hall of Fame (1992)
- Rock and Roll Hall of Fame (1993)
- Disney Legends (2013)

Organizational

- Broadcast Pioneers of Philadelphia Person of the Year (1980)

Awards and achievements
Preceded by Richard Dawson	Daytime Emmy Award for Outstanding Game Show Host; 1979	Succeeded by Peter Marshall
Preceded by Bob Barker	Daytime Emmy Award for Outstanding Game Show Host; 1985–1986	Succeeded by Bob Barker
Media offices
Preceded by Position created	Host of Pyramid; 1973–1988	Succeeded by John Davidson
Preceded by Position created	Executive producer/host of New Year's Rockin' Eve; 1973–2012; Served alongside: Regis Philbin (2005; as executive producer); Ryan Seacrest (2006–12; as host)	Succeeded by Ryan Seacrest
Preceded by Alan Thicke	Miss USA host 1989–1993	Succeeded by Bob Goen
Preceded by John Forsythe	Miss Universe host 1990–1993	Succeeded by Bob Goen
Preceded by Tony Mammarella	American Bandstand host 1956–1989	Succeeded by David Hirsch
