= Matthew Strachan =

English composer (1970–2021)

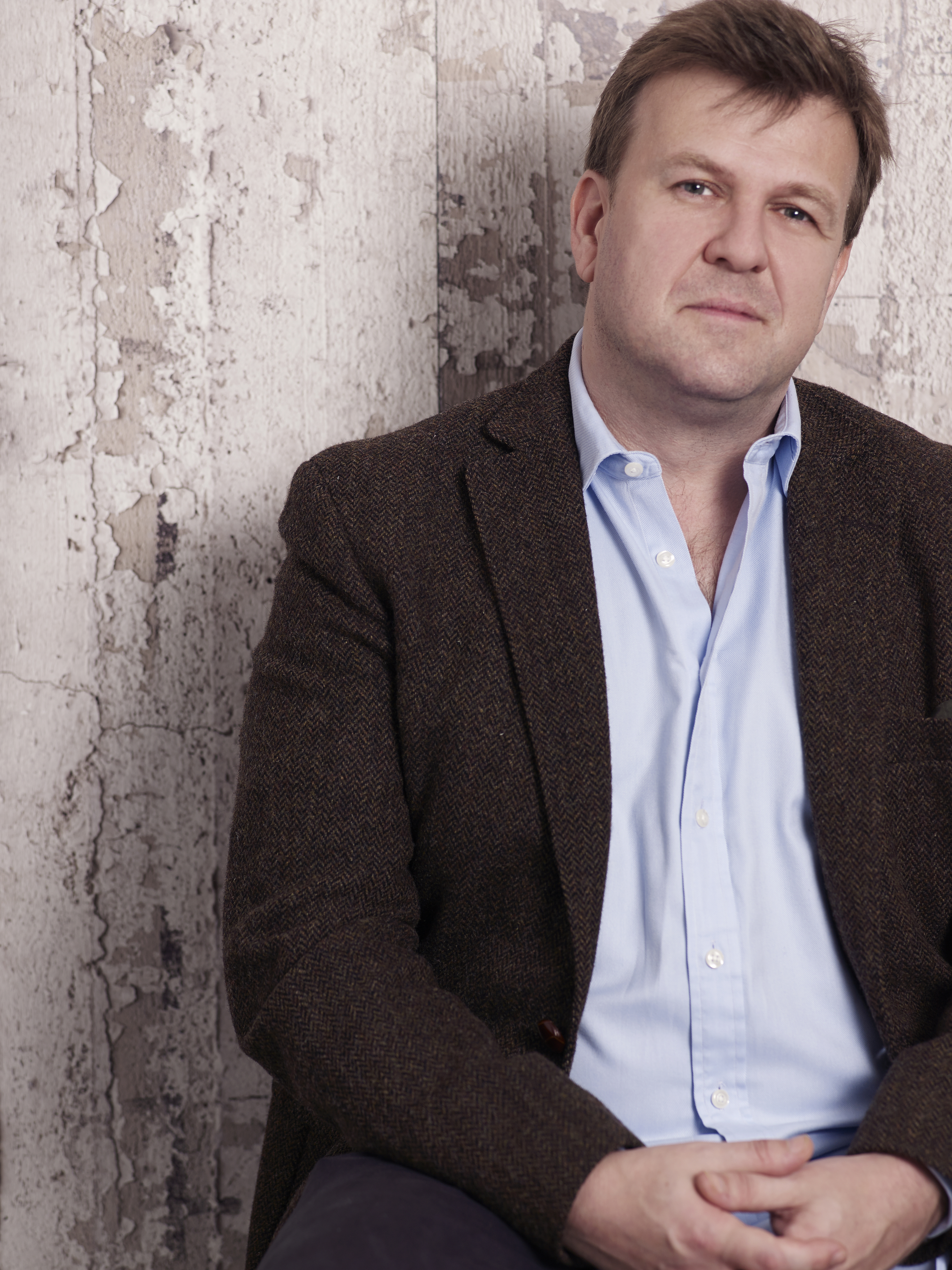
- Strachan in 2016

Background information
- Born: 11 December 1970
- Origin: London, England
- Died: 8 September 2021 (aged 50) Twickenham, London, England
- Genres: Rock/pop, country
- Occupations: Singer-songwriter; composer; lyricist
- Instrument: Piano
- Years active: 1986–2021
- Labels: Nono, Nessus, Lonely Goat Records
- Website: matthewstrachan.co.uk

Matthew Strachan (/ˈstrɔːn/ STRAWN or /ˈstrækən/ STRAK-ən; 11 December 1970 – 8 September 2021) was an English composer and singer-songwriter.

His best known work is the music for British television game show Who Wants to Be a Millionaire? written with his father Keith, which would become a global franchise, and the BBC Radio 4 World War I drama series Home Front. He also wrote music to film and television productions such as Extract, The Detectives, Question Time, Winning Lines, jingles for several television commercials, and scores for stage musicals.

== Biography ==
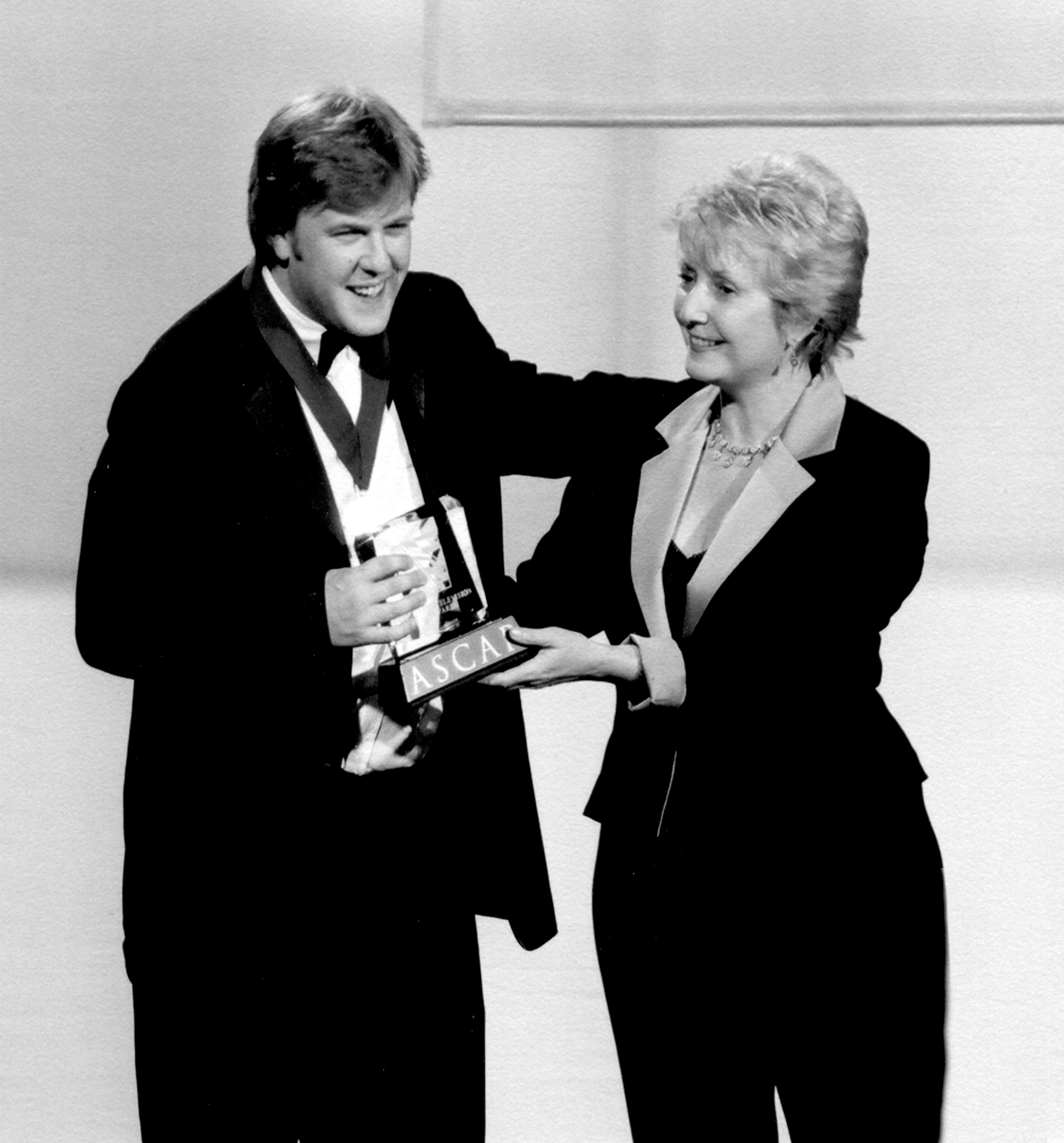
Strachan at the ASCAP 17th Film & TV Awards in Los Angeles

Strachan began writing songs as a teenager. His first professional job was to write five songs for the BBCTV drama Boogie Outlaws.

After training at Dartington College of Arts and Goldsmiths College, University of London, he worked as a soundtrack composer throughout the 1990s creating music for television, radio and theatre productions until concentrating on songwriting in Nashville, Tennessee where he collaborated with songwriters Don Henry, Tom Kimmel, J. Fred Knobloch, and Thom Schuyler.

Following two years in America he created score and lyrics for the stage musicals About Bill and Next Door's Baby. In 2012 he announced the creation of a comedy oratorio based on the life of the Coronation Street character Ken Barlow for inclusion in his live shows.

Strachan won twelve awards from the American Society of Composers, Authors and Publishers (ASCAP) and in 2012 received the ASCAP Hall of Fame Award in recognition of ten consecutive wins for the soundtrack of Who Wants to Be a Millionaire?

As a singer-songwriter Strachan was regarded as having a bittersweet style, often employing satire and characterisation to make political points about unusual subjects such as social networking and the media. As a composer of stage musicals he was noted for writing songs with a complete narrative arc.

A new studio album by Matthew Strachan titled Serious Men was released by Lonely Goat Records in August 2016.

He was also the creator of the comic fictional 1970s composer Klaus Harmony. In March 2017 Simon & Schuster announced that it would be publishing a series of crime fiction books co-written by Strachan and his wife, Bernadette Strachan.

In October 2020, he appeared at Lavender Hill Magistrates Court in London, charged with one count of arson. Prior to that, it was suspected that Matthew attempted to commit suicide by using beddings to set fire to the kitchen. He was then sentenced to ten months in jail and a two year suspension with a notice to undergo alcohol and mental health treatments.

On 22 September 2021, the BBC reported that Strachan had died at his home in Twickenham, London, at the age of 50.

== Discography ==
Albums

- A Quiet Place I've Waited, Nono Records (2017)
- Serious Men, Lonely Goat Records (2016)
- Perfect World Now Possible, Nono Records (2014)
- Live at the St James Theatre, Nono Records (2013)
- 25 Year Songbook Part II, Nono Records (2012)
- 25 Year Songbook, Nono Records (2012)
- 37203, Nono Records (2004)
- Even Warren Beatty (with Tim Whitnall), Nono Records (2002)
- Save The King's Head, Nono Records (2000)
- Fallen Angels, Nono Records (1999)
- The Rock Serious Electric Roadshow, Nono Records (1993)

Compilations

- Speed Limit Monkey, Nono Records (2008)
- Flot Some, Jet Some, Nono Records (2008)

Covered by other artists

- I Never Left You at All – J. Fred Knobloch, Hear Here, J. Fred Knobloch Music, (2015)
- Journeyman – Catherine Porter, single, Nono Records, (2011)
- Any More of You – Catherine Porter, 37203, Nono Records, (2004)
- Love is Enough – J. Fred Knobloch, 37203, Nono Records, (2004)
- The Note – Don Henry, 37203, Nono Records, (2004)
- Mama 'n' Them – J. Fred Knobloch, single, Nono Records, (2008)
- Just Because I Want To – Tommy Blaize, Even Warren Beatty, Nono Records, (2008)

Soundtracks and Musicals

- As Is & Passing By, Nessus Records (2013)
- About Bill, Nessus Records (2011)
- Music for Theatre, Nessus Records (2011)
- Silk, Nessus Records (2009)
- Next Door's Baby, Nessus Records (2006)
- Who Wants to Be a Millionaire? – Soundtrack, Celador Records (2000)
- Who Wants to Be a Millionaire? – Interactive Game, Sony PlayStation, Disney Interactive (2000)
- Toy Story Sing Along, Disney (1997)

A.k.a Klaus Harmony

- Oeuvre Cinq, HarmonSink (2010)
- Oeuvre 4, HarmonSink (2009)
- Oeuvre Derde, HarmonSink (2008)
- Oeuvre Zwei, HarmonSink (2007)
- Oeuvre I, HarmonSink (2006)

== Music for motion pictures ==
- Mostly Dead, UkFilm.co
- Love Is a Four Letter Word Worth Seven Points, Boxfly Media, (2015)
- In Limbo, Nine Ladies Films, (2015)

== Music featured in motion pictures ==
- Extract, Composer – Wundercrotchen, Miramax Films, (2009)
- Slumdog Millionaire, Composer – Who Wants to Be a Millionaire?, Fox Searchlight, (2008)
- Millions, Composer – Who Wants to Be a Millionaire?, Fox Searchlight, (2004)
- Celador Films Theme, Celador Films
- About a Boy, Composer – Who Wants to Be a Millionaire?, Universal Pictures, (2002)
- A Kind of Hush, Composer/lyricist – Confusions, First Film Company/Metrodome, (1998)

== Music for stage ==
- Twitstorm, Park Theatre (London)
- The Roundabout, Park Theatre (London)/59E59 Theaters, New York
- Acorn, Courtyard Theatre, London
- The Man Called Monkhouse, Edinburgh Fringe/National Tour
- As Is, Trafalgar Studios
- Passing By, Tristan Bates Theatre
- As Is, Finborough Theatre
- Yours for the Asking, Orange Tree Theatre
- About Bill, Landor Theatre
- Hungry Ghosts, Orange Tree Theatre
- The Promise, Orange Tree Theatre
- The Making of Moo, Orange Tree Theatre
- Silk, Workshopped at the Orange Tree Theatre
- Last Train to Nibroc, Orange Tree Theatre
- Next Door's Baby, Orange Tree Theatre
- Happy Birthday Dear Alice, Orange Tree Theatre
- The Lodger, Theatre Royal, Windsor
- The Fly, Old Fire Station Theatre
- Mad Dog Killer Leper Fiend, Man in the Moon Theatre
- Simpleton of the Unexpected Isles, Orange Tree Theatre
- The Good Woman of Setzuan, Orange Tree Theatre

== Music for television and radio ==
- Home Front, composer, BBC Radio 4
- Money, Composer Finding Schuyler & Can You See me From Over There? BBC2
- Who Wants to Be a Millionaire? 10th Anniversary American Broadcasting Company
- Super Millionaire American Broadcasting Company
- Sketch Show Story BBC1
- Who Wants to Be a Millionaire?, Celador Productions, ITV, American Broadcasting Company
- Winning Lines, Celador Productions, CBS, BBC
- Ben-Hur (syndicated US Radio Drama) Focus on the Family
- Britain's Brainiest, Celador Productions, International
- Question Time, Mentorn Films, BBC
- Car Wars, Mentorn Films, BBC
- The Gemini Apes, BBC Radio 4
- Mind the Gap ITV
- Nobblers, BBC Radio 2
- The Hypnotic World of Paul McKenna, Celador Productions, ITV
- Diggin' the Dancing Queens BBC
- The Detectives, Celador Productions, BBC
- Canned Carrott, Celador Productions, BBC
- The Jasper Carrott Trial, Celador Productions, BBC
- Children's Ward, Granada Television, ITV
- World Sport Esprit, TWI, International
- Legends of Wimbledon, TWI, International
- Scratchy and Co, Mentorn Films, ITV
- Boogie Outlaws BBC

== Awards ==
- ASCAP Awards, Hall of Fame Award, 2012, London
- ASCAP Awards, US TV Theme, 2011, London
- ASCAP Awards, US TV Theme, 2010, London
- ASCAP Awards, US TV Theme, 2009, London
- ASCAP Awards, US TV Theme, 2008, London
- ASCAP Awards, US TV Theme, 2007, London
- ASCAP Awards, US TV Theme, 2006, London
- ASCAP Awards, US TV Theme, 2005, London
- ASCAP Awards, US TV Theme, 2004, London
- ASCAP 17th Annual Film & TV Awards, Top TV Theme, 2002, Los Angeles
- ASCAP 16th Annual Film & TV Awards, Top TV Theme, 2001, Los Angeles
- ASCAP Awards, US TV Theme, 2000, London
