= Kim Ismay =

British actress and singer

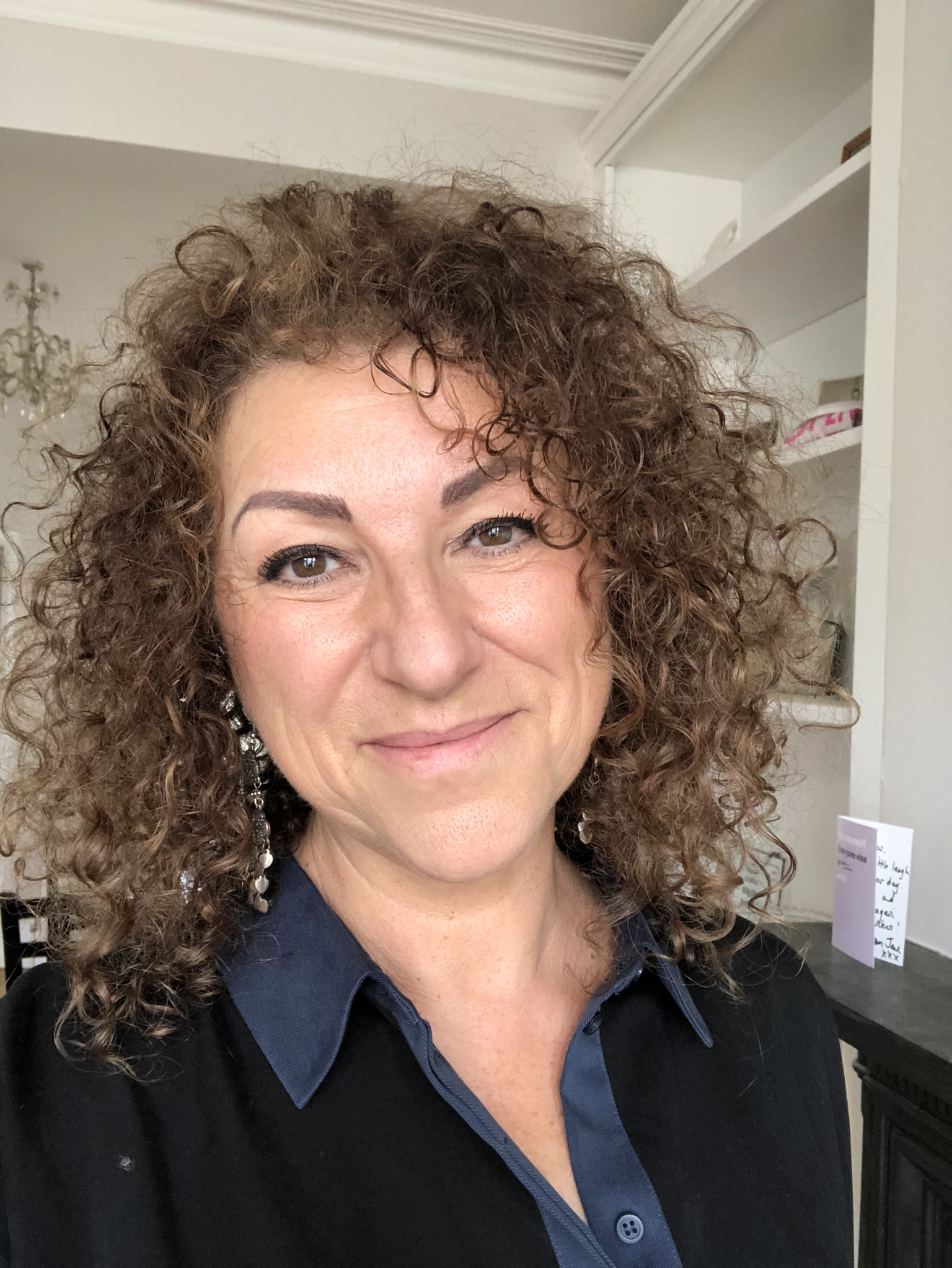
Kim Ismay in 2020

Kim Ismay is a British actress and singer and a former member of the Royal Shakespeare Company. She is perhaps best known for playing the role of Tanya in the London production of the stage musical Mamma Mia!, Madame Morrible in the international and UK & Ireland tours of Wicked and as the Baroness in Chitty Chitty Bang Bang.

== History ==
The daughter of Ellen Ismay (1923–2002), Kim Ismay took a Bachelor of Arts degree in Performing Arts at the University of Kent.

Since 1997 Ismay has been a Director and Fellow of the New Era Academy of Drama & Music. She is a patron of Momentum, the children's cancer charity, helping them to raise funds by producing and directing galas featuring West End stars. She is also an Ambassador for the Theatre charity Acting for Others, and an active supporter of Madtrust, the theatrical AIDS charity.

== Career ==
=== Theatre ===
Ismay's theatre appearances include Cabaret (1986) at the Strand Theatre; Stop the World – I Want to Get Off at the Lyric Theatre (1989); the Royal Shakespeare Company productions of Kiss Me, Kate (1986–87), The Wizard of Oz (1988–89) and The Comedy of Errors (1992–93); Joanna in the original London production of Sunset Boulevard (1993); Next Door's Baby (2008); Noises Off (2009); How the Other Half Loves (2009); Baroness Bomburst in the 2008 and 2009–10 UK tours of Chitty Chitty Bang Bang; Tanya in Mamma Mia! at the Prince Edward Theatre, Prince of Wales Theatre and the Novello Theatre; and Madame Morrible in the national and international tours and West End production of Wicked.

=== Television ===
Her television appearances include Never the Twain (1991), London's Burning (1998), Bob Martin (2000), The Bill (1994–2006), was interviewed for the documentary Super Troupers: Thirty Years of ABBA (2004), The Sound of Musicals (2006), EastEnders (2007), and Not Going Out (2012).

=== Other ===
A regular and popular radio guest, she also records audiobooks for Calibre.
