= And the Sky Full of Stars =

- Babylon 5 episode
- Episode no.: Season 1 Episode 8
- Directed by: Janet Greek
- Written by: J. Michael Straczynski
- Production code: 106
- Original air date: March 16, 1994

Guest appearances
- Christopher Neame as Knight Two; Judson Scott as Knight One; Jim Youngs as Benson; Justin Williams as Mitchell

Episode chronology
← Previous "The War Prayer"	Next → "Deathwalker"

"And the Sky Full of Stars" is the eighth episode of the first season of the science fiction television series, Babylon 5. It first aired on 16 March 1994.

== Title ==
The episode title is derived from a line from Babylon 5's pilot episode: "…and the sky was full of stars, and every star was an exploding ship — one of ours."

== Plot ==
Two men meet aboard Babylon 5, and prepare a device. They gain the help of Benson, a security officer, who provides them with a power cell in exchange for paying off illegal gambling debts he owes. That night the two men abduct Commander Sinclair and use the device on him. Sinclair finds that he is trapped within a virtual reality illusionary environment, in which one of his captors demands to know what happened to him at the Battle of the Line, the final battle in the Earth-Minbari war ten years earlier. Sinclair was leader of a squadron of fighters which was ambushed by Minbari vessels. While the rest of his squadron was wiped out, Sinclair managed to survive, though having lost a day's worth of memories. His captors want to know what he saw, in order to discover why the Minbari suddenly surrendered after Sinclair's disappearance.

Meanwhile, security chief Michael Garibaldi discovers that Sinclair is missing, and orders security teams to search the station. When he learns Benson is on one team, and that his gambling debts have been paid off, Garibaldi suspects Benson knows about Sinclair's disappearance. Benson returns to Sinclair's captors and begs for help, but they kill him and throw his body out through an airlock. The body is later found by the station staff, allowing them to narrow down the likely area where Sinclair is kept.

Meanwhile, Sinclair struggles to fight off his captors' influence on him, but they eventually break through to his subconsciousness. Sinclair relives his experiences of the Battle of the Line. After his fighter was damaged, Sinclair was taken aboard a Minbari vessel and was taken to the Grey Council, the ruling body of Minbar. Sinclair demanded to know who they were, and pulled the hood off one of them, to reveal Delenn. The Grey Council knocked Sinclair out, scanned him, and returned him to his ship so as to be found by human forces. The trauma of reliving the event for Sinclair enables him to escape his bonds, slamming the device into one captor, shocking him, and stunning the other one. As Sinclair runs, he is still heavily sedated and experiences hallucinations of the Grey Council instead of the regular station staff, and threatens to shoot any that cross his path. Garibaldi sets off to stop him, as does Minbari ambassador Delenn. At the Zocolo, Garibaldi tries to convince Sinclair of his hallucinatory condition, but when Delenn appears, Sinclair recognizes her. He breaks out of his trance in time to kill the pursuing captor.

Dr Franklin helps purge the sedatives from Sinclair's body. Learning that Earth's government has taken custody of the surviving captor, Sinclair tries to interview him before he is taken away, but discovers he has no memories of what happened. Sinclair goes to see Delenn, who asks if he remembered anything he saw; Sinclair feigns that he had forgotten it and leaves, only to record his memories in his personal log that night. A Minbari official approaches Delenn to see if Sinclair had remembered anything, saying that if he should ever recall his encounter with the Grey Council, he must be killed.

== Production, Visual and Sound Effects ==
=== Cast and filming ===
Michael O'Hare, who played Commander Sinclair, regarded this as one of his favorite episodes." It delves into the missing 24 hours of Sinclair's memories from the Earth-Minbari War and his pain and frustration from that. O'Hare was able to understand having everything taken away from him from experiences in his private life, where the same had happened. Additionally, he enjoyed playing the wartime experiences, as he had a brother who flew in navy F-14 aircraft, and another who was a captain involved in building aircraft carriers. He later stated, "Most of the [military] people have a tendency to be a very good sort, very noble, really care about God and country. And there's a moment... when I talk about everyone dying in front of me, and I really did that as a tribute to my brothers and the fact that what they do for a living involves the threat of loss of the most complete kind."

O'Hare also suggested to the director, Janet Greek, that during the scenes with Earth fighters exploding around him, that they have lights coming from different directions, "...the audience watches him turn and see another comrade killed, turn again and see another... and then another... It brings home to the audience that everyone's dying."

The role of Knight Two was played by English actor Christopher Neame. Neame appeared in a number of BBC dramas, including a number of roles in series set during World War 2. Neame later moved to the United States and appears in guest roles in a number of series, including Star Trek: Enterprise. Michael O'Hare stated, "He was great fun to work with. One of the things I liked about the show was I got the chance to work with a lot of Englishmen, and I love English actors." The role of Knight Two was originally offered to Walter Koenig, best known for he portrayal of Pavel Chekov in the original Star Trek series and films. Koenig was unable to accept at the time for health reasons, but was later cast as the recurring character of Bester in "Mind War". The role of Knight Two was then offered to The Prisoner star Patrick McGoohan, who likewise wished to accept, but was not going to be in the country at the time of filming, and also had to decline the role.

Actor Judson Scott played the character of Knight One. Scott is known for playing Khan's chief henchman in Star Trek: The Wrath of Khan, and became friends with Ricardo Montalbán, who played Khan. Scott has played characters in a number of stage productions, and television science fiction and action series, including The Phoenix (1982 TV series), the 1984 series V, and the Star Trek franchise.

=== Sound and Visual Effects ===
The Babylon 5 makeup department involved in this episode, consisted of the team from makeup design company Optic Nerve. The team – Everett Burrell, Greg Funk, Mary Kay Morse, Ron Pipes and John Vulich – won the 1994 Emmy Award for Outstanding Individual Achievement in Makeup for a Series for "The Parliament of Dreams", a previous episode of the season. The initial design for the Minbari characters was created by production designer Steve Burg, with the Optic Nerve team finalising the design.

For its visual effects scenes, Babylon 5 pioneered the use of computer-generated imagery (CGI) scenes – instead of using more expensive physical models – in a television series. This also enabled motion effects which are difficult to create using models, such as the rotation of fighter craft along multiple axes, or the rotation and banking of a virtual camera. The visual effects were created by Foundation Imaging using 24 Commodore Amiga 2000 computers with LightWave 3D software and Video Toaster cards, 16 of which were dedicated to rending each individual frame of CGI, with each frame taking on average 45 minutes to render. In-house resource management software managed the workload of the Amiga computers to ensure that no machine was left idle during the image rendering process.

The flashback sequence from the Battle of the Line contained a large number of CGI sequences, with 25 scenes in the space of one and a half minutes. For comparison, the entire 90-minute pilot episode only had around 55 CGI sequences. The Starfury fighters, also designed by Steve Burg, were a function-driven design for a plausible zero-gravity fighter. The positioning of the four engine pods at the extremities of the craft was inspired by Ron Cobb's design for the Gunstar fighter from The Last Starfighter. The basic shape of the Starfury's wings was inspired by an earlier unused design by Burg for a military robot fighting machine, which he had originally designed for Terminator 2. This was merged with the multi-engined configuration to form the Starfury design.

Despite having a similar wing configuration to the Star Wars X-Wing fighter, this was purely coincidental. Burg recollected, "The X-Wing is a very long needle shaped craft from most angles, whereas the Starfury is a very blunt shape. The X-Wing is also very much configured like a WWII fighter. Ideal for the 'Star Wars' universe but not what we were going for on Babylon 5." Burg also points out that the Starfury's wings/struts were not aerodynamic: they were there to lever the engines away from the center of mass.

The Minbari cruisers were designed by the animators at Foundation Imaging, with Ron Thornton contributing to the design. Thornton indicated that the design was influenced by the proud and impressive appearance of the lionfish, but was also designed to be more vertical, like the sunfish.

Music for the title sequence and the episode was provided by the series' composer, Christopher Franke. Franke developed themes for each of the main characters, the station, for space in general, and for the alien races, endeavoring to carry a sense of the character of each race.

== Reviews ==
Rowan Kaiser, writing in The A.V. Club, sees the episode as the first real demonstration of Babylon 5's heavily serialised overall storyline. Kaiser points out the dichotomy between an episode which, on its own, fails to answer the question of why the Minbari surrendered; and the episode as part of a larger story where there will be a payoff for what we see here. He writes,

"There's no way to understand 'And The Sky Full Of Stars' as an episode that exists on its own ... We now know that two of our main characters were involved, but precisely what they were involved in is a mystery. In that sense, 'And The Sky Full Of Stars' is a disappointment on an individual level. It started to move toward giving us a resolution as its main point, but it didn't give us that. Yet I still find 'And The Sky Full Of Stars' to be compelling on its own ... In the end, we get more information, but full answers are lost."

Elias Rosner, writing in the entertainment magazine website Multiversity Comics, in intrigued by the questions that the episode raises. He comments, "What is Delenn up to? Why is a member of the Grey Council acting as an ambassador? And why can he never know what they did to him? The questions are raised and they're all good ones. Certainly the strongest part of the episode."

While Kaiser regards the episode as moving "entertainingly quickly", Rosner finds the episode not very engaging. He does feel it is redeemed by a frank discussion between Sinclair and Garibaldi about how people lie out of insecurity: "Everyone lies. The innocent lie because they don't want to be blamed. The guilty because they have no choice. Find out why he's lying."

Writer Keith R.A. DeCandido regards the episode as one of the best so far. He singles out Michael O'Hare's portrayal of Sinclair's anger, confusion and frustration as his best performance up to that point. "It's a beautifully done set of sequences, culminating in some genuine revelations about Sinclair's missing time," DeCandido writes, "Of course, those revelations just prompt more questions...".

DeCandio also praises Mira Furlan's portrayal of Delenn, "Mira Furlan has done superb work in showing Delenn’s complexity and depth—and deviousness. There is a lot more to her than meets the eye, and Furlan expertly plays it without overdoing it or losing the character’s charisma and charm."
