= Christopher Neame =

English actor (born 1947)

- Born: 12 September 1947 (age 78); London, England
- Occupation: Actor

Christopher Neame (born 12 September 1947) is an English actor who resides in the United States.

== UK career ==
Neame's UK film credits include appearances in two Hammer Horror films: Lust for a Vampire (1971) and Dracula AD 1972 (1972). He also appeared in No Blade of Grass (1970).

He appeared in The Rivals of Sherlock Holmes as Sydney Wing in the episode entitled "The Secret of the Magnifique". In 1975 he played Kaiser Wilhelm II in the ITV 13-part drama series, Edward the Seventh.

He was featured in two BBC dramas dealing with the Second World War: as Lieutenant Dick Player in Colditz (1972–74), and as Flight Lieutenant John Curtis in the first season of the World War II drama, Secret Army (1977). In between those, in the TV film A Point in Time (1973), he appeared nude on the small screen.

Neame played the villain Skagra in the unfinished Doctor Who serial Shada in 1979. He provided his voice to complete the serial using animation in 2017. Neame made a guest appearance in another BBC period drama When the Boat Comes In in 1981 portraying Robin Cunningham. In 1983, he played Mark Antony in the BBC series The Cleopatras.

== US career ==
Neame emigrated to the United States and has made frequent appearances in American films and television. He appeared in the films, Steel Dawn (1987), D.O.A. (1988), Bloodstone (1988), Licence to Kill (1989), Ghostbusters II (1989), Edge of Honor (1991), Suburban Commando (1991), Hellbound (1994), Ground Zero (2000) and The Prestige (2006).

He played a psycho killer in an episode of MacGyver in 1985, and appeared in The Great Escape II: The Untold Story. In 1989, he played the character Gustav Hellstrom, a Swedish businessman, in the 12th season of the TV series Dallas, appearing in 3 episodes: "Serpent's Tooth", "April Showers", "And Away We Go". He also appeared in a two-part story of Star Trek: Enterprise, "Storm Front" and "Storm Front, Part II", in 2004. In 1994, he portrayed "Knight Two" in the Babylon 5 episode "And the Sky Full of Stars". Neame is one of the few actors to have appeared in Doctor Who, Blake's 7, the Star Trek franchise, Babylon 5, and Earth 2. Other television appearances include Dynasty, The A-Team, Benson, Beauty and the Beast, Northern Exposure (1994), JAG (1995), and the two-part mini-series The Apocalypse Watch (1996). He also starred in the Showtime film Street Knight (1994) and he appeared as "The One" in the last two episodes of Martial Law (2000). He also played the main villain in the live-action cutscenes of Star Wars Jedi Knight: Dark Forces II (1997). In 2018, he reunited with his Hammer film co-star Caroline Munro to appear in the film House of the Gorgon.

== Filmography ==
Year	Title	Role	Notes
1970	No Blade of Grass	Locke	
1971	Lust for a Vampire	Hans	
1972	Dracula A.D. 1972	Johnny Alucard	
1987	Steel Dawn	Sho	
1988	D.O.A.	Bernard	
1988	Bloodstone	Ludwig Van Hoeven	
1989	Licence to Kill	Fallon	
1989	Ghostbusters II	Maitre D	
1991	Edge of Honor	Blade	
1991	Suburban Commando	Commander	
1991	Diplomatic Immunity	Stefan Noll	
1993	Street Knight	James Franklin	
1994	Hellbound	Lockley	
1995	Walking Thunder	Ansel Richter	
2006	The Prestige	Defender	
2019	Missing Link	Old Worlder	Voice

== Television ==
Year	Title	Role	Notes
1971	ITV Sunday Night Theatre	Daniel Dirk	Episode: Giants and Ogres
1972	The Regiment	Lt. Raeburn	Episode: "The Fortunes of Peace"
1972	The Shadow of the Tower	Earl of Warwick	Episode: "The Fledgling"
1972–1974	Colditz	Lt. Dick Player	Series regular
1973	The Rivals of Sherlock Holmes	Sydney Wing	Episode: "The Secret of the Magnifique"
1974	The Protectors	Glen Bailey	Episode: "Blockbuster"
1974	Napoleon and Love	Captain Junot	3 episodes
1975	Quiller	Myers	Episode: "The Thin Red Line"
1977	Secret Army	Flight Lieutenant John Curtis	First season only
1978	Target	Billy	Episode: "The Run"
1980	Doctor Who	Skagra	Serial: "Shada" (incomplete, reconstructed in 2017)
1981	When the Boat Comes In	Robin Cunningham	Episode: "Friends, Romans Countrymen"
1981	Blake's 7	Colonel Quute	Episode: "Traitor"
1983	The Cleopatras	Mark Antony	3 episodes
1985	By the Sword Divided	Henry Snelling	Episode: "Witch Hunt"
1985	Lime Street		Pilot
1985	The A-Team	Jack Scarett	Episode: "The Road to Hope"
1985	Benson	Max Heimlich	Episode: "We Spy"
1986	The Fall Guy	Terrill	Episode: "No Rms Ocean Vu"
1986	Riptide	Klaus Gunter	Episode: "The Pirate and the Princess"
1986	Days of Our Lives	Ogden Vaughn/Dr. Vertigo	30 episodes
1986–1991	MacGyver	Various	4 episodes
1987	Love Among Thieves	Ian	TV film
1987	Spies	Hans Von Sykes	Episodes: "The Game's Not Over, 'Til the Fat Lady Sings"
1987	Second Chance	William Shakespeare	Episode: "Moving In"
1988	The Great Escape II: The Untold Story	Kiowski	TV film
1988–1989	Dynasty	Hamilton Stone	3 episodes
1989	Mancuso, F.B.I.		Episode: "Conflict of Interest"
1989	Life Goes On	Clive Graham	Episode: "Paige's Mom"
1990	L.A. Law	Alan Scott	Episode: "True Brit"
1990	Superboy	Deville	Episode: "Carnivale"
1991	The Flash	Brian Gideon	Episode: "Sight Unseen"
1991	P.S. I Luv U	Jack Truduae	Episode: "An Eye for an Eye"
1992	Parker Lewis Can't Lose	The Warrior	Episode: "Geek Tragedy"
1992	Boris and Natasha: The Movie	Fearless Leader	TV film
1992	Still Not Quite Human	Dr. Frederick Berrigon	TV film
1992	Human Target	Deguerre	Episode: "Designed by Chance"
1993	The Legend of Prince Valiant	Various	2 episodes
1993	Irresistible Force	James Barron	TV film
1993	Acapulco H.E.A.T.	Walter Steinholtz	Episode: "Code Name: Archangel"
1993–1995	Murder, She Wrote	Peter Jatich/Dr. John Sullivan	2 episodes
1994	Babylon 5	Knight Two	Episode: "And the Sky Full of Stars"
1994	Northern Exposure	Vladimir Ilyich Lenin	Episode: "Zarya"
1995	Star Trek: Voyager	Unferth	Episode: "Heroes and Demons"
1995	Earth 2	Dr. Franklin Bennett	Episode: "All About Eve"
1996	Deadly Games	Dr. Kramer	Episode: "Dr. Kramer"
1996	Sliders	Dr. Manfred Xang	Episode: "Into the Mystic"
1997	JAG	Minister Vartan Ketish	Episode: "Washington Holiday"
1997	C-16: FBI	Andre Divak aka The Sandman	Episode: "The Sandman"
1998	Killer Net	DS Collingwood	2 episodes
1999	Seven Days	KGB Captain	Episode: "There's Something About Olga"
2000	Martial Law	The One	2 episodes
2000	Movie Stars	Gestapo Officer	2 episodes
2000	Trial & Retribution	Ben Duffield	2 episodes
2001	The Invisible Man	Dr. Henrick	Episode: "Immaterial Girl"
2004	Star Trek: Enterprise	German General	Episode: "Storm Front"
2004	Species III	Dr. Nicholas Turner	TV film
2005	All Grown Up!	Manheim	Episode: "Executive"
2006	Vanished	Claude Alexander	2 episodes

== Video Games ==
Year	Title	Role	Notes
1996	Conqueror A.D. 1086	The King	
1997	Star Wars Jedi Knight: Dark Forces II	Jerec	
2011	Star Wars: The Old Republic	Various	
