= Judson Scott =

American actor (born 1952)

- Born: Judson Earney Scott; July 15, 1952 (age 73); Azusa, California, U.S.
- Education: California State University, Fullerton (BA); Juilliard School (GrDip)
- Occupation: Actor
- Years active: 1978–2002
- Spouse: Fabiana Udenio (m. 1986; div. 1995)

Judson Earney Scott (born July 15, 1952) is an American stage, film and television actor. He has appeared in a number of science fiction productions, especially within the Star Trek franchise, as well as V and three episodes of The X-Files.

== Early years ==
Scott was born in Azusa, California and attended Carl Sandberg Jr. High and Glendora High Schools. He then went to California State University, Fullerton, received a B.A. in Theatre Arts, and trained at the Actors Studio in Los Angeles. At the end of the school year in college, Scott entered the American College Theatre Festival and won the Irene Ryan Award for Best Actor in the Western United States. Scott was then offered a scholarship to Yale School of Drama, but instead attended the Juilliard School in New York City, where he again graduated with a B.A. in Theater Arts.

== Career ==
In 1979, Scott was in a Broadway production of Shakespeare's Richard III at the Cort Theatre for a one-month run. Appearing under the name Judson Earney, Scott took the role of Lord Grey in a cast featuring Al Pacino in the title role. Scott's credited film appearances in later years included I, the Jury (1982), Escape (1990), True Identity (1991), and Blade (1998).

Scott starred in the short-lived 1982 science fiction television series The Phoenix. His other television roles include Lt. James in seven episodes of V, and as Sacha Malenkov on The Colbys. He also portrayed Peter Harrell on General Hospital in 1984–85 and Clay Monroe in One Life to Live in 1985.

Other guest appearances include Mission: Impossible (as Ernst Graff in "The Legacy"), Voyagers!, The Dukes of Hazzard, The A-Team, Babylon 5 (as "Knight One" in "And the Sky Full of Stars", 1994), Charmed (as "Necron" in episodes "A Witches Tale" 1 & 2), The Adventures of Brisco County, Jr. (Episode: "No Man's Land", as outlaw Gill Swill), The X-Files and The Greatest American Hero (as Dak Hampton in the episode "Rock 'n' Roll"). He also made three appearances on Matt Houston as a Navajo shaman turned assassin.

=== Star Trek roles ===
In the 1982 film Star Trek II: The Wrath of Khan, Scott played Joachim, chief lieutenant of Khan Noonien Singh. Despite having many lines of dialogue, Scott's name does not appear in the credits. According to TV Guide, Scott's agent was in negotiations with Paramount to get his name high billing in the movie, but the tactic backfired and somehow Scott wound up with no credit at all. He played opposite Ricardo Montalbán, which resulted in a friendship that lasted until Montalbán's death in January 2009. When Montalbán received a lifetime achievement award in 2003, Scott was the presenter.

Scott's next role in the Star Trek franchise was Sobi, a central character in "Symbiosis", a first-season episode of Star Trek: The Next Generation. In this episode Scott played opposite Merritt Butrick, who played Admiral Kirk's son in Star Trek II and Star Trek III.

Scott also played a Romulan in the fourth-season Star Trek: Voyager episode "Message in a Bottle".

Scott still makes appearances at science fiction conventions and has his own fan club composed mostly of Star Trek fans.

== Filmography ==
- The Dukes of Hazzard (1979–1985) - Lee Benson
- The Phoenix (1982 TV series) (1981 - TV Movie, 1982 - TV series) - Bennu
- I, the Jury (1982) - Charles Kendricks
- Star Trek II: The Wrath of Khan (1982) - Joachim (uncredited)
- The Greatest American Hero (1983) - Dak Hampton, lead singer of a rock group called Elvira
- The A-Team (1984) - Episode: "Incident at Cristal Lake"
- V: The Series (1984) - Lieutenant James
- Mission : impossible (TV Series) Episode : The Legacy (1988) - Ernst Graff
- Star Trek: The Next Generation (TV Series) Episode: "Symbiosis" (1988) - Sobi
- Escape (1989) - Gabriel LaFontaine
- True Identity (1991) - Iago
- Walker, Texas Ranger (1993-2001) - Travis Braxton
- The Adventures of Brisco County, Jr. (TV Series) Episode: "No Man's Land" (1993) - Gil Swill
- Blade (1998) - Pallantine
- Babylon 5 (TV Series) Episode: And The Sky Full Of Stars (1994) - Knight One
- Star Trek: Voyager (TV Series) Episode: Message in a Bottle (1998) - Rekar
