= Felicity Waterman =

British actress

- Born: England
- Occupation: Actress
- Years active: 1989–2000

Felicity Waterman is an English actress known for her role as Vanessa Hunt during the final two seasons of the television drama series Knots Landing, and for her role as regular cast member Lt. Abigail Hawling on the syndicated television series Pensacola: Wings of Gold (1999–2000).

She has also appeared in other TV series such as Thunder in Paradise (as Megan Whitaker Spencer, two episodes, 1994) Babylon 5 (as "Kelsey" in "Mind War", 1994), SeaQuest DSV, Ellen, Northern Exposure, Weird Science and La Femme Nikita, and in direct-to-video movies including Unlawful Passage, Lena's Holiday, and Miracle Beach.

== Personal life ==
Waterman's father was in the British Army. Her grandfather flew Spitfires during World War II. Her mother taught children with learning disabilities.

Waterman attended boarding school at Millfield, in Somerset, England. Waterman focused on athletics, but a back injury curtailed a promising career as a high jumper. Switching to a more academic course of study, she entered Oxford University in 1982, where she read Geography at Christ Church. After graduating in 1985, she began modelling as a way to see the world, and was eventually brought to Los Angeles by the prestigious Elite Agency.

Her first roles were bit parts in Side Out and Die Hard 2, playing a stewardess in both films. Her first film in a lead role was 1991's Lena's Holiday, in which she played an East German tourist in Los Angeles who gets caught up in a murder plot.

She currently resides in California, USA.

== Filmography ==
=== Film ===
Year	Title	Role	Notes
1990	Side Out	Stewardess	
1991	Lena's Holiday	Lena Jung	
1992	Miracle Beach	Dana Stanford	
1992	Space Case	Melissa	
1994	Unlawful Passage	Gale	
1995	Hard Bounty	Rachel	
1998	Freedom Strike	Maddie Reese	

=== Television ===
Year	Title	Role	Notes
1992–1993	Knots Landing	Vanessa Hunt	
1994	Babylon 5	Ms. Kelsey	Episode: "Mind War"
1994	Thunder in Paradise	Megan Whitaker Spencer	Episode: "Thunder in Paradise (Parts 1 & 2)"
1997	La Femme Nikita	Karyn	Episode: "Recruit"
1999–2000	Pensacola: Wings of Gold	Lt. Abigail Hawling	
