= Joachim (Star Trek) =

- Star Trek character
- First appearance: "Space Seed" (1967)
- Last appearance: The Wrath of Khan (1982)
- Portrayed by: Mark Tobin; Judson Scott

In-universe information
- Species: Genetically-engineered human

Joachim (also Joachin and Joaquin) is a genetically engineered character in the fictional Star Trek universe who appears as one of Khan Noonien Singh's henchmen in the Star Trek episode "Space Seed" and the film Star Trek II: The Wrath of Khan, in which he is played by Mark Tobin and Judson Scott, respectively.

The official Star Trek site maintained by Paramount Pictures describes Joachim as a "genetically superior blonde-haired young man". The script for Star Trek II: The Wrath of Khan describes Joachim as "the largest and brightest of Khan's group".

== Name and identity ==
In the text commentary for the Star Trek II director's edition DVD, Michael Okuda, co-author of The Star Trek Encyclopedia and a consultant on various Star Trek films and TV shows, points out that in "Space Seed", the character's name is Joachin (or Joaquin, according to the end credits of "Space Seed", as well as StarTrek.com) but that he was accidentally renamed Joachim in the film.

In contrast, Greg Cox's non-canon novels The Eugenics Wars (Volume 1 & 2) and To Reign in Hell: The Exile of Khan Noonien Singh depict Joachim as the son of Joaquin and another SS Botany Bay survivor, Suzette Ling. In Cox's books, Joachim and the others who accompany Khan in Star Trek II were born in exile on Ceti Alpha V.

Paramount Pictures' official Star Trek website maintains separate entries for Joaquin and Joachim.

== Portrayal ==
=== Mark Tobin ===
Mark Tobin played Joaquin in "Space Seed". He also played a Klingon in the episode "Day of the Dove".

=== Judson Scott ===
In Star Trek II: The Wrath of Khan, Joachim was played by Judson Scott. However, Scott's name does not appear in the credits. According to TV Guide, Scott's agent was in negotiations with Paramount Pictures to get Scott high billing, but the tactic backfired and Scott wound up with no credit at all.

While this was one of a few Star Trek roles for Scott, he:

made his most memorable Trek appearance as Khan's son, Joachim, in Star Trek: The Wrath of Khan. Not only did he get a featured role in the best Star Trek movie ever, but he got to play opposite Ricardo Montalbán. The two entered into a friendship which is still alive and well today. Recently, when Ricardo received a lifetime achievement award, Judson was the presenter.

Scott also played a Brekkan in Star Trek: The Next Generation's "Symbiosis" (opposite Star Trek II co-star Merritt Butrick) and a Romulan in Star Trek: Voyager's "Message in a Bottle". As of 2003, Scott still made appearances at science fiction conventions and had his own fan club composed mostly of Star Trek fans.

== Character history ==
=== Eugenics Wars ===
Joaquin was born in the 20th century on Earth. In 1993, Khan is among 40 "supermen" who seize control of Earth. Khan, along with Joaquin and his other disciples, ruled Southeast Asia and half of the Middle East.

According to dialog in the Star Trek: Enterprise episode "Borderland", the Eugenics Wars of the 1990s was a conflict between genetic "augments" that lead to 30 million deaths. In the wake of this turmoil, Khan, Joaquin, and 82 other followers escaped Earth aboard the SS Botany Bay, a modified freighter that carried them in suspended animation for nearly 300 years.

=== "Space Seed" ===
In the Star Trek episode "Space Seed", the crew of the USS Enterprise discovers the Botany Bay adrift with its crew still in suspended animation. After being revived, Khan woos Lieutenant Marla McGivers and, with her help, revives Joaquin and the rest of his surviving followers. After briefly taking control of the Enterprise, Captain James T. Kirk exiles Khan and his followers—including Joaquin and McGivers—to Ceti Alpha V.

=== Star Trek II: The Wrath of Khan ===
Fifteen years later, Khan and his followers escape Ceti Alpha V by taking control of the USS Reliant with Joachim at the helm. Khan is intent on exacting revenge on Kirk, but Joachim attempts to convince Khan that by escaping exile and acquiring a ship, Khan has already bested Kirk. However, Khan continues his pursuit.

Joachim later refuses to take the Reliant into the Mutara Nebula, where the ship's defenses and sensors would be useless; Khan pilots the ship in himself.

The Enterprise's attacks cause a bulkhead to collapse on Joachim, mortally wounding him. Khan removes the bulkhead and cradles Joachim, whose last words are "yours is superior". Khan then says he will avenge Joachim's death.

Khan shortly thereafter detonates the Genesis device in an unsuccessful attempt to kill Kirk, destroying the Reliant and everyone aboard. Spock sacrifices his own life to enable the Enterprise to escape.

== Role-playing games ==
Joachim is a card in the Star Trek Customizable Card Game. He is a "gold" card, meaning that he is neutral rather than allied with the Federation, the Klingons or the Romulans. The card identifies Joachim as "Khan's lieutenant and most trusted friend."

FASA's Star Trek role-playing game has a supplement that gives full statistics for Joachim so that he can be used as a non-player character. FASA also made a 25 mm lead figurine of Joachim.
