= The War Prayer (Babylon 5) =

- Babylon 5 episode
- Episode no.: Season 1 Episode 7
- Directed by: Richard Compton
- Written by: D. C. Fontana
- Production code: 107
- Original air date: March 9, 1994

Guest appearances
- Tristan Rogers as Malcolm Biggs; Nancy Lee Grahn as Shaal Mayan; Michael Paul Chan as Roberts; Rodney Eastman as Kiron Maray; Danica McKellar as Aria Tensus

Episode chronology
← Previous "Mind War"	Next → "And the Sky Full of Stars"

"The War Prayer" is the seventh episode of the first season of the science fiction television series, Babylon 5. It first aired on 9 March 1994. The episode deals with a string of anti-alien attacks on Babylon 5, and the arrival of Malcolm Biggs, who formerly had romantic ties with Lt Commander Ivanova, and who is involved with the anti-alien Home Guard movement.

== Plot ==
A string of attacks on aliens has occurred on Babylon 5, the latest being the stabbing and branding of a Minbari poet, Shaal Mayan. Commander Sinclair is pressured by Minbari ambassador Delenn to find the culprit, and he orders Security Chief Garibaldi to investigate in depth. Narn ambassador G'kar, however, insists more action must be done, and beings to rally the other aliens aboard, creating a tense situation.

Meanwhile, Centauri ambassador Londo Mollari must deal with his aide Vir Cotto's cousin Kiron and his girlfriend Aria, who have fled the Centauri homeworld as they have been arranged to be wed into different families. Mollari asserts that arranged marriages are a Centauri tradition, love having no place in their society. That evening, Kiron and Aria are attacked, leaving Kiron in a coma.

Elsewhere, Ivanova discovers that her former associate from the academy, Malcolm Biggs, has arrived on the station. While he remains secretive as to his business reasons for being there, Malcolm does express interest in rekindling his relationship with Ivanova.

Aria stays by Kiron's side, though Mollari suggests that there is no point in her spending time with Kiron in the hospital. Shaal talks with Mollari about love, stating that she found all sentient beings to be characterized by their capacity to love others and be loved. When Vir later finds Mollari, the latter tells him a tale from his father who had complained that his shoes were too tight, adding that it did not matter as he had forgotten how to dance. Mollari says he now feels the same way.

When Kiron wakes, Mollari tells him and Aria that he has arranged for them to return to Centauri Prime and stay with his cousin, a powerful figure in the government, to be fostered by him and schooled in Centauri customs. He promises that once they are old enough, they will be allowed to choose whom to marry. He explains this defiance of the usual customs by them being still "children" who should be allowed to "dance". This solution pleases both them and Vir.

Ivanova brings Malcolm to a reception where Sinclair purposely speaks out against the alien presence, hoping to gain the trust of the hidden attackers. Indeed, Malcolm later invites Sinclair and Ivanova to a meeting where he introduces them to his allies that have been behind the attacks, using advanced stealth technology developed by Earthforce. Malcolm explains that they plan to assassinate the four key ambassadors on Babylon 5 in order to provoke an even larger attack against aliens on Earth. They then ask Sinclair to kill an alien woman they have captured in order to prove his loyalty. Instead Sinclair and Ivanova turn on Malcolm and his allies, as security officers arrive to arrest them.

As the arrested conspirators are taken off the station, Malcolm and Ivanova mutually express their disappointment at each other.

== Production ==
=== Cast ===
The Home Guard leader Malcolm Biggs was played by Australian-American actor Tristan Rogers, best known for playing Robert Scorpio in General Hospital. Earlier, he played roles in a number of prominent Australian serials such as Number 96, Bellbird. and The Box. In 2019 he won a Daytime Emmy Award for his role as Doc in the series Studio City.

Minbari poet Shaal Mayan was played by Nancy Lee Grahn, who also appears in General Hospital, playing Alexis Davis, winning a Daytime Emmy Award in 2012. Grahn also starred as Julia Wainwright Capwell on Santa Barbara, winning an Emmy Award in 1989.

Vir's cousin Kiron Maray was played by Canadian actor Rodney Eastman, best known for playing Joey Crusel in the A Nightmare on Elm Street film series. He is also a musician with the Los Angeles band King Straggler with fellow actors John Hawkes and Brentley Gore.

Kiron's girlfriend Aria Tensus was played by actress, mathematician and mathematics educator Danica McKellar. McKellar played Winnie Cooper in The Wonder Years, and Elsie Snuffin in The West Wing. She later wrote several mathematics books for children and secondary school students, some of which became New York Times bestsellers.

American actor Michael Paul Chan played Roberts, a suspect in the attack on Shaal Mayan. Chan is known for playing the role of Lieutenant Michael Tao in The Closer and Major Crimes. He also played roles in The Goonies, Batman Forever, Batman & Robin and Falling Down.

=== Music, sound and visual effects ===
The Babylon 5 makeup department involved in this episode – consisting of Everett Burrell, Greg Funk, Mary Kay Morse, Ron Pipes and John Vulich – won the 1994 Emmy Award for Outstanding Individual Achievement in Makeup for a Series for episode 5 of the season, "The Parliament of Dreams"

The design for the Vorlon ambassador, Kosh, who appears in this episode, was created by Steve Burg for the pilot episode. The suit he wears had remote-controlled servo motors to operate the eye lens and the movements of various appendages on the suit, with the lights on the front being operated by the person inside.

For its visual effects scenes, Babylon 5 pioneered the use of computer-generated imagery (CGI) scenes – instead of using more expensive physical models – in a television series. This also enabled motion effects which are difficult to create using models, such as the rotation of fighter craft along multiple axes, or the rotation and banking of a virtual camera. The visual effects were created by Foundation Imaging using 24 Commodore Amiga computers with Lightwave 3D software.

Music for the title sequence and the episode was provided by the series' composer, Christopher Franke. Franke developed themes for each of the main characters, the station, for space in general, and for the alien races, endeavoring to carry a sense of the character of each race. The voice effects for the Vorlon ambassador Kosh, were also designed by Franke, with the character voiced by Ardwight Chamberlain.

== Writing ==
According to showrunner J. Michael Straczynski, the title refers to a short prose writing of the same title – written to highlight the humanity of participants of both sides in war – by Mark Twain, which, according to Straczynski, "should be read by everyone".

Regarding Mark Twain, Straczynski wrote, "He's always been a seminal influence on my work. I have pretty much everything he's ever written, absent the five volume set of his journals that's only available to libraries. 'The Man Who Corrupted Hadleyburg' is still one of my favorite pieces, as is 'The War Prayer', leading to its nod in B5."

As Babylon 5 was conceived with an overall five-year story arc, the episode was written as both an individual story and with another level, where the hints of the larger story arc were given. The series' creator, J. Michael Straczynski indicates that the episodes can be watched for the individual stories, the character stories, or the story arc.

The episode was written by D.C. Fontana who has written episodes for many television series, including a large number of episodes for various Star Trek series. Fontana was a writer for the Star Trek: The Next Generation pilot episode, "Encounter at Farpoint". She also wrote two other Babylon 5 scripts, "Legacies" and "A Distant Star". Fontana wrote the episode, based on a premise by Straczynski. Only the pilot was available for research purposes, so she spent some time speaking with Straczynski to get a feel for the series.

== Commentary and Reviews ==
Writers Ensley Guffey and Dale Koontz observe that Londo refers to his wives as Pestilence, Famine and Death, three of the four horsemen of the Apocalypse, and that as the fourth member, Londo himself would thus seem to be War, which bodes ill for the events to come.

Rowan Kaiser, writing in The A.V. Club, notes that the episode develops the idea that human culture in the year 2258 isn't entirely pleasant. Kaiser writes, "This isn't a necessary revelation after 'Infection' and 'Mind War', but it's not meant to be a revelation—it's a premise."

Kaiser also identifies the theme of regret appearing throughout the episode. He writes,

Ivanova has regrets, though she claims not to, about leaving Malcolm eight years prior. Delenn has a conversation with her friend, where she's asked "Do you regret the choices that you've made?" "Sometimes", responds Delenn, but she makes it clear that those don't define her. Londo, on the other hand, lets his regrets define him. "My shoes are too tight. But it does not matter, for I have forgotten how to dance", he tells Vir, as a metaphor for him forgetting himself in favor of tradition, of propriety, and of power.

Elias Rosner, writing in the Multiversity Comics website, also singles out this scene, with Londo discussing with Vir about what it means to be trapped in his own ways, to have forgotten what it is to be young. Rosner observes, "It's a profound scene that's the right balance of clarity and mystique. Londo's words carry all the weight in the world and in that moment, we understand where he is and what he is thinking ... It's a fantastic bit of dialogue that is revealing in all the right ways."
