= Miracle Beach =

1992 film

- Directed by: Skott Snider
- Written by: Scott Bindley
- Produced by: Brad Krevoy
- Starring: Dean Cameron; Ami Dolenz; Felicity Waterman; Pat Morita
- Cinematography: Bernard Salzmann
- Edited by: Emma E. Hickox
- Music by: Eric Allaman
- Production company: Motion Picture Corporation of America
- Distributed by: Columbia Tri-Star Home Video
- Release date: September 30, 1992
- Running time: 88 minutes
- Country: United States
- Language: English

Miracle Beach (released in the Philippines as Genie, My Love and subtitled Hardbodies II in Australia) is a 1992 fantasy/comedy film starring Dean Cameron, Ami Dolenz, Felicity Waterman and Pat Morita.

== Plot ==
Scotty McKay (Cameron) is just an everyday beach-bum who used to have it all, when he finds an attractive genie named Jeannie (Dolenz). Her mission is to assist Scotty. With Jeannie's help, Scotty has everything again and more, as Jeannie does his bidding and answers to his every beck and call; that is until he asks Jeannie to make him more desirable to the next door supermodel, Dana (Felicity Waterman).

Jeannie can't help as far as love is concerned, and besides, Dana is just not interested. Jeannie soon runs into problems when she finds herself attracted to Scotty and finds it difficult to help him win Dana's heart.

When Dana starts cheating with her ex, Scott is convinced by Jeannie to make Dana jealous by wishing her visible to others as his lover. Scotty starts seeing Jeannie's love for him and begins ignoring Dana. Scott ultimately decides to choose Jeannie, who becomes human after his declaration of love; the genie couldn't declare her love first due to the same magic.

== Cast ==
- Dean Cameron as Scotty McKay
- Ami Dolenz as Jeannie Peterson
- Felicity Waterman as Dana
- Pat Morita as Gus
- Allen Garfield as Magnus O'Leary
- Alexis Arquette as Lars
- Martin Mull as Donald Burbank
- Vincent Schiavelli as "Mystic"
- Dean Cain as Volleyball Player #1
- Frances Buchsbaum as Scotty's Grandmother
- Johnny Cocktails as Mac
- Cecile Krevoy as Scotty's Mother
- Brian Perry as "Soup"
- Gary Grant as Himself
- Monique Gabrielle as Cindy Beatty (credited as Monique Gabriel)
- Mark Blutman as Bernie

== Release ==
Miracle Beach was released direct-to-video on VHS by Sony Pictures Home Entertainment on September 30, 1992. In the Philippines, the film was released in theaters as Genie, My Love on October 20, 1992; it was marketed as "suitable for the whole family".

It was released on DVD as part of the MGM Limited Edition Collection on November 17, 2015. It was released on Blu-ray by Kino Lorber on April 19, 2016.
