= The Phoenix (1982 TV series) =

- Genre: Science fiction
- Created by: Anthony Lawrence; Nancy Lawrence
- Starring: Judson Scott; E. G. Marshall; Richard Lynch
- Composer: Arthur B. Rubinstein
- Country of origin: United States
- Original language: English
- No. of seasons: 1
- No. of episodes: 5

Production
- Executive producer: Mark Carliner
- Producers: Leigh Vance; Christopher Kochoff; Anthony Lawrence; Nancy Lawrence
- Cinematography: Donald H. Birnkrant; Frank Beascoechea; Frank Tidy
- Editors: Marvin Adelson; David Berlatsky; Tony de Zarraga
- Running time: 60 minutes (including commercials)
- Production company: Mark Carliner Productions

Original release
- Network: ABC
- Release: March 19 – April 16, 1982

The Phoenix is an American science fiction television series starring Judson Scott that aired on ABC for about one month. The series premiered on March 19, 1982. The plot revolved around an ancient extraterrestrial, Bennu of the Golden Light, who is discovered in a sarcophagus in Peru and awakened in the 20th century. The series was preceded by a TV movie on April 26, 1981.

== Characters ==
- Bennu of the Golden Light (played by Judson Scott), the protagonist, is an alien who possesses special abilities including physical levitation, telepathy, precognition, clairvoyance, astral projection and telekinesis. Some of these are made possible or amplified by his Phoenix Amulet, which draws power from the Sun. Bennu's home planet was originally called Aurica, but this was changed to Eldebran for broadcast.
- Yago is another being from the planet Eldebran. He is evil and Bennu's primary opponent. Yago is connected to the Moon, as Bennu is to the Sun. The series bible explicitly compares Yago to Lucifer and Dracula. He wears a bracelet called "The Bells of Thon" around his right wrist, which has the power to deafen. He also carries a musical instrument called "The Black Moonball", which can alter his appearance or teleport him to another location. In the series bible Yago was named Aiwaz, presumably after the alleged being who dictated The Book of the Law to Aleister Crowley.
- Mira (played by Sheila Frazier) is another being from the planet Eldebran. 40,000 years ago she was placed on Earth as Bennu's companion, and when the series begins he is searching for her.
- Justin Preminger (played by Richard Lynch) is the recurring human antagonist of the story, a tough, cynical and relentless former P.O.W. in Vietnam turned government agent. He is obsessed with capturing Bennu, who, despite what his superiors say, he believes to be nothing more than some sort of New Age con man. He is generally only one step behind his alien quarry.
- Dr. Ward Frazier (played by E. G. Marshall) is a scientist sympathetic to Bennu and his goals.

== Sources and influences ==
- The series bible mentions Erich von Däniken's books Chariots of the Gods? (1968) and Gods from Outer Space (1970) as the source of the idea that aliens may have visited the Earth roughly 40,000 years ago.
- Yago's ability to create illusions using the power of the Moon was, according to the series bible, "implied in the Lunacy Act of 1842 [sic]".
- Bennu is the Egyptian word for the mythological phoenix bird.

== Episodes ==
No.	Title	Original release date
1	"The Phoenix"	April 26, 1981
2	"In Search of Mira"	March 26, 1982
3	"One of Them"	April 2, 1982
4	"A Presence of Evil"	April 9, 1982
5	"The Fire Within"	April 16, 1982
