= Star Trek II: The Wrath of Khan =

1982 US science fiction film by Nicholas Meyer

- Theatrical release poster art by Bob Peak
- Directed by: Nicholas Meyer
- Screenplay by: Jack B. Sowards
- Story by: Harve Bennett; Jack B. Sowards
- Based on: Star Trek by Gene Roddenberry
- Produced by: Robert Sallin
- Starring: William Shatner; Leonard Nimoy; DeForest Kelley; James Doohan; Walter Koenig; George Takei; Nichelle Nichols; Bibi Besch; Merritt Butrick; Paul Winfield; Kirstie Alley; Ricardo Montalbán
- Cinematography: Gayne Rescher
- Edited by: William Paul Dornisch
- Music by: James Horner
- Production company: Paramount Pictures
- Distributed by: Paramount Pictures
- Release date: June 4, 1982
- Running time: 113 minutes
- Country: United States
- Language: English
- Budget: $12 million
- Box office: $97 million

Star Trek II: The Wrath of Khan is a 1982 American science fiction film directed by Nicholas Meyer and based on the television series Star Trek. It is the second film in the Star Trek film series following Star Trek: The Motion Picture (1979), and is a sequel to the television episode "Space Seed" (1967). The plot features Admiral James T. Kirk (William Shatner) and the crew of the starship USS Enterprise facing off against the genetically engineered tyrant Khan Noonien Singh (Ricardo Montalbán). When Khan escapes from a 15-year exile to exact revenge on Kirk, the crew of the Enterprise must stop him from acquiring a powerful terraforming device named Genesis. The film is the beginning of a three-film story arc that continues with the film Star Trek III: The Search for Spock (1984) and concludes with the film Star Trek IV: The Voyage Home (1986).

After the lackluster critical response to the first film, series creator Gene Roddenberry was forced out of the sequel's production. Executive producer Harve Bennett wrote the film's original outline, which Jack B. Sowards developed into a full script. Director Nicholas Meyer completed its final script in twelve days, without accepting a writing credit. Meyer's approach evoked the swashbuckling atmosphere of the original series, referring to the film as "Horatio Hornblower in space", a theme reinforced by James Horner's musical score. Leonard Nimoy had not intended to have a role in the sequel, but was enticed back on the promise that his character would be given a dramatic death scene. Negative test audience reaction to Spock's death led to significant revisions of the ending over Meyer's objections. The production team used various cost-cutting techniques to keep within budget, including using miniature models from past projects and reusing sets, effects footage, and costumes from the first film. The film was the first feature film to contain a sequence created entirely with computer graphics.

Star Trek II: The Wrath of Khan was released in North America on June 4, 1982, by Paramount Pictures. It was a box office success, earning US$97 million worldwide and setting a world record for its first-day box office gross. Critical reaction to the film was positive; reviewers highlighted Khan's character, Meyer's direction, improved performances, the film's pacing, and the character interactions as strong elements. Negative reactions focused on weak special effects and some of the acting. The Wrath of Khan is often considered to be the best film in the Star Trek series, and is often credited with renewing interest in the franchise. In 2024, the film was selected by the Library of Congress for preservation in the United States National Film Registry as being "culturally, historically or aesthetically significant".

== Plot ==
In 2285, Admiral James T. Kirk oversees a simulator session of Captain Spock's trainees. In the simulation, Lieutenant Saavik commands USS Enterprise, a starship on a rescue mission to save the crew of the damaged ship Kobayashi Maru, but is attacked by Klingon cruisers and critically damaged. The simulation is a no-win scenario designed to test the character of Starfleet officers. Later, Dr. Leonard McCoy visits Kirk on his birthday; seeing Kirk in low spirits due to his age, the doctor advises Kirk to get a new command instead of growing old behind a desk.

Meanwhile, the starship Reliant is on a mission to search for a lifeless planet to test the Genesis Device, a technology designed to reorganize dead matter into habitable worlds. Reliant's captain Clark Terrell and first officer Pavel Chekov beam down to evaluate a planet they mistakenly believe to be Ceti Alpha VI. Once there, they are captured by the genetically engineered tyrant Khan Noonien Singh, who explains that they are on Ceti Alpha V. Fifteen years prior, Kirk exiled Khan and his followers there after they attempted to take over Enterprise; six months later, Ceti Alpha VI exploded, shifting the orbit of Ceti Alpha V and turning it into a desert wasteland. The catastrophe killed many of Khan's followers, while others, including his wife, were killed by native parasitic Ceti eels.

Khan implants Chekov and Terrell with eel larvae, rendering them susceptible to mind control, and uses the pair to capture Reliant. While Khan's lieutenant, Joachim, suggests abandoning his quest for revenge, Khan insists on killing Kirk. Learning of the Genesis Device, Khan attacks space station Regula I, where the device is being developed by Kirk's former lover, Dr. Carol Marcus, and their son, David.

Kirk assumes command of Enterprise after the ship, deployed on a training cruise, receives a distress call from Regula I. En route, Enterprise is ambushed and crippled by Reliant. Khan offers to spare Kirk's crew if they relinquish all material related to Genesis; Kirk instead stalls for time and, taking advantage of Khan's unfamiliarity with starships, remotely lowers Reliant's shields, enabling a counter-attack. Khan is forced to retreat and effect repairs, while Enterprise limps to Regula I. Kirk, McCoy, and Saavik beam to the station and find Terrell and Chekov alive and Carol Marcus's team slaughtered. They find Carol and David hiding Genesis deep inside the nearby planetoid. Khan, having used Terrell and Chekov as spies, orders them to kill Kirk; Terrell resists the eel's influence and kills himself, while Chekov collapses and the eel leaves his body. Khan transports Genesis aboard Reliant, intending to maroon Kirk on the planetoid, but is tricked by Kirk and Spock's coded arrangements for a rendezvous. Kirk directs Enterprise into the nearby Mutara Nebula, successfully taunting Khan into following him; conditions inside the nebula render shields useless and compromise targeting systems, making Enterprise and Reliant evenly matched. Spock notes that Khan's tactics indicate inexperience in three-dimensional combat, which Kirk exploits to disable Reliant.

Mortally wounded, Khan activates Genesis, quoting Captain Ahab as he dies. Kirk's crew detects the activation and attempts to move out of range, but with the ship's warp drive damaged, they cannot escape the nebula in time. Spock goes to the irradiated engine room to restore warp power. When McCoy tries to prevent Spock's entry, Spock incapacitates him with a Vulcan nerve pinch and performs a mind meld, telling him to "remember". Spock repairs the warp drive, and Enterprise jumps to warp, escaping the explosion, which forms a new planet. Before dying of radiation poisoning, Spock urges Kirk not to grieve, as his decision to sacrifice himself to save Enterprise was a logical one. Kirk and the ship's crew host a space burial for Spock, whose casket lands on the new Genesis planet.

== Cast ==
The Wrath of Khan's cast includes all the major characters from the original television series, as well as new actors and characters.

- William Shatner as James T. Kirk, a Starfleet admiral and former commander of the Enterprise. Kirk and Khan never confront each other face-to-face during the film; all of their interactions are over a viewscreen or through communicators, and their scenes were filmed four months apart. Meyer described Shatner as an actor who was naturally protective of his character and himself, and who performed better over multiple takes.
- Ricardo Montalbán as Khan Noonien Singh, a genetically enhanced superhuman who had used his strength and intellect to briefly rule much of Earth in the 1990s. Montalbán said that he believed all good villains do villainous things, but think that they are acting for the "right" reasons; in this way, Khan uses his anger at the death of his wife to justify his pursuit of Kirk. Contrary to speculation that Montalbán used a prosthetic chest, the director insisted no artificial devices were added to Montalbán's muscular physique. Montalbán enjoyed making the film, so much so that he played the role for much less than was offered him, and counted the role as a career highlight. His major complaint was that he was never face-to-face with Shatner for a scene. "I had to do my lines with the script girl, who, as you might imagine, sounded nothing like Bill [Shatner]", he explained. Bennett noted that the film was close to getting the green light when it occurred to the producers that no one had asked Montalbán if he could take a break from filming the television series Fantasy Island to take part.
- Leonard Nimoy as Spock, the captain of the Enterprise who relinquishes command to Kirk after Starfleet sends the ship to Regula I. Nimoy had not intended to have a role in The Motion Picture's sequel, but was enticed back on the promise that his character would be given a dramatic death scene. Nimoy reasoned that since The Wrath of Khan would be the final Star Trek film, having Spock "go out in a blaze of glory" seemed like a good way to end the character.
- DeForest Kelley as Leonard McCoy, the Enterprise's chief medical officer and a close friend of Kirk and Spock. Kelley was dissatisfied with an early version of the script to the point that he considered not taking part. Kelley noted his character spoke many of the film's funnier lines, and felt that this role was essential in bringing a lighter side to the onscreen drama.
- James Doohan as Montgomery Scott, the Enterprise's chief engineer. Kelley felt that McCoy speaking his catchphrase "he's dead, Jim" during Spock's death scene would ruin the moment's seriousness, so Doohan instead says the line "he's dead already" to Kirk. Scott loses his young nephew following Khan's attacks on Enterprise. The cadet, played by Ike Eisenmann, had many of his lines cut from the original theatrical release, including a scene that explains he is Scott's relative. These scenes were reintroduced in a television edit and in the director's edition, making Scott's grief at the crewman's death more understandable.
- George Takei as Hikaru Sulu, Enterprise's helm officer. Takei had not wanted to reprise his role for The Wrath of Khan, but Shatner persuaded him to return.
- Walter Koenig as Pavel Chekov, the Reliant's first officer and former Enterprise crewmember. During filming, Kelley noted that Chekov never met Khan in "Space Seed" (Koenig had not yet joined the cast), and thus Khan's recognizing Chekov on Ceti Alpha did not make sense. Non-canon Star Trek books attempted to rationalize this discrepancy; in the film's novelization by Vonda N. McIntyre, Chekov met Khan during "Space Seed" in an off-screen scene, while the novel To Reign in Hell: The Exile of Khan Noonien Singh has Chekov escort Khan to the surface of Ceti Alpha V after the events of the television episode. The real cause of the error was a simple oversight by the filmmakers. Meyer defended the mistake by noting that Arthur Conan Doyle made similar oversights in his Sherlock Holmes stories. Chekov's screaming while being infested by the Ceti eel caused Koenig to jokingly dub the film Star Trek II: Chekov Screams Again, in reference to a similar screaming scene in The Motion Picture.
- Nichelle Nichols as Uhura, the Enterprise's communications officer. Nichols helped convince Meyer and Bennett to marginally cut back their vision of a more militaristic depiction of Starfleet, with which Star Trek creator Gene Roddenberry also took issue.
- Bibi Besch as Carol Marcus, the lead scientist working on Project Genesis, and the mother of Kirk's son. Meyer wanted an actress for the role who was beautiful enough that it was plausible a womanizer such as Kirk would fall for her, yet who could also project a sense of intelligence.
- Merritt Butrick as David Marcus, a Project Genesis scientist and Kirk's son. Meyer liked that Butrick's hair was blond like Besch's and curly like Shatner's, making him a plausible child of the two.
- Paul Winfield as Clark Terrell, the captain of Reliant. Meyer had seen Winfield's work in films such as Sounder and thought highly of him; there was no reason for casting the actor as the Reliant's captain other than Meyer's desire to direct him. Meyer thought in retrospect that the Ceti eel scenes might have been corny, but felt that Winfield's performance helped add gravity.
- Kirstie Alley as Saavik, Spock's protege and a Starfleet commander-in-training aboard Enterprise. The movie was Alley's first feature film role. Serving on board as the navigator in Chekov's absence, she has a strong habit of questioning Kirk's eccentric heroic methods, preferring a more by-the-book approach. Saavik cries during Spock's funeral. Meyer said that during filming someone asked him, "'Are you going to let her do that?' And I said, 'Yeah', and they said, 'But Vulcans don't cry', and I said, 'Well, that's what makes this such an interesting Vulcan.'" The character's emotional outbursts can be partly explained by the fact that Saavik was described as of mixed Vulcan-Romulan heritage in the script, though no indication is given on film. Alley was so fond of her Vulcan ears that she would take them home with her at the end of each day.
- Judson Scott as Joachim, Khan's chief henchman. Scott took the role believing that it would be more prominent and requested top billing. When Paramount refused, Scott waived billing, believing that he would still appear in the end credits. Instead his performance went uncredited.

== Production ==
=== Development ===
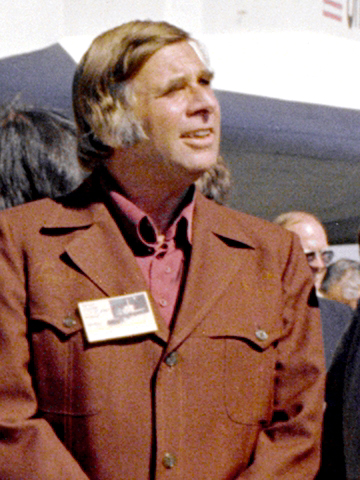
Gene Roddenberry was removed from a direct role in the development of The Wrath of Khan due to concerns that he was the main reason behind The Motion Picture's lukewarm reception.

After the release of Star Trek: The Motion Picture, producer Gene Roddenberry wrote his own sequel. In his plot, the Enterprise crew travel back in time to set right a corrupted time line after Klingons use the Guardian of Forever to prevent the assassination of John F. Kennedy. This was rejected by Paramount Pictures executives, who blamed the tepid reception and costs of the first film on its plodding pace and the constant rewrites Roddenberry demanded. As a consequence, Roddenberry was removed from the production and, according to William Shatner, "kicked upstairs" to the ceremonial position of executive consultant.

Harve Bennett, a new Paramount television producer, was made producer for the next Star Trek film. According to Bennett, he was called in front of a group including Jeffrey Katzenberg and Michael Eisner and asked if he thought he could make a better film than The Motion Picture, which Bennett confessed he found "really boring". When Bennett replied in the affirmative, Charles Bluhdorn asked, "Can you make it for less than forty-five-fucking-million-dollars?" Bennett replied that "Where I come from, I can make five movies for that." Bennett realized he faced a serious challenge in developing the new Star Trek film, partly due to his never having seen the television series. Watching episodes of the show convinced Bennett that what the first picture lacked was a real villain; after seeing the episode "Space Seed", he decided that the character of Khan Noonien Singh was the perfect enemy for the new film. Bennett selected Robert Sallin, a director of television commercials and a college friend, to produce the film. Sallin's job would be to produce Star Trek II quickly and cheaply. Bennett hired Michael Minor as art director to shape the direction of the film.

Bennett wrote his first film treatment in November 1980. In his version, titled The War of the Generations, Kirk investigates a rebellion on a distant world and discovers that his son is the leader of the rebels. Khan is the mastermind behind the plot, and Kirk and son join forces to defeat the tyrant. Bennett then hired Jack B. Sowards, an avid Star Trek fan, to turn his outline into a filmable script. Sowards wrote an initial script before a writer's strike in 1981. Sowards' draft, The Omega Syndrome, involved the theft of the Federation's ultimate weapon, the "Omega system". Sowards was concerned that his weapon was too negative, and Bennett wanted something more uplifting "and as fundamental in the 23rd century as recombinant DNA is in our time", Minor recalled. Minor suggested to Bennett that the device be turned into a terraforming tool instead. At the story conference the next day, Bennett hugged Minor and declared that he had saved Star Trek. In recognition of the Biblical power of the weapon, Sowards renamed the "Omega system" to the "Genesis Device".

By April 1981, Sowards had produced a draft that moved Spock's death to later in the story, because of fan dissatisfaction of the event after the script was leaked. Spock had originally died in the first act, in a shocking demise that Bennett compared to Janet Leigh's early death in Psycho. This draft had a twelve-page face-to-face confrontation between Kirk and Khan inside the Genesis cave. Sowards' draft introduced a male character named Saavik. As pre-production began, Samuel A. Peeples, writer of the Star Trek episode "Where No Man Has Gone Before", was invited to offer his own script. Peeples' draft replaced Khan with two new villains named Sojin and Moray; the alien beings are so powerful they almost destroy Earth by mistake. This script was considered inadequate; the aliens resembled too closely the villains on a typical TOS (Star Trek: The Original Series) episode. Deadlines loomed for special effects production to begin (which required detailed storyboards based on a finished script), which did not exist.

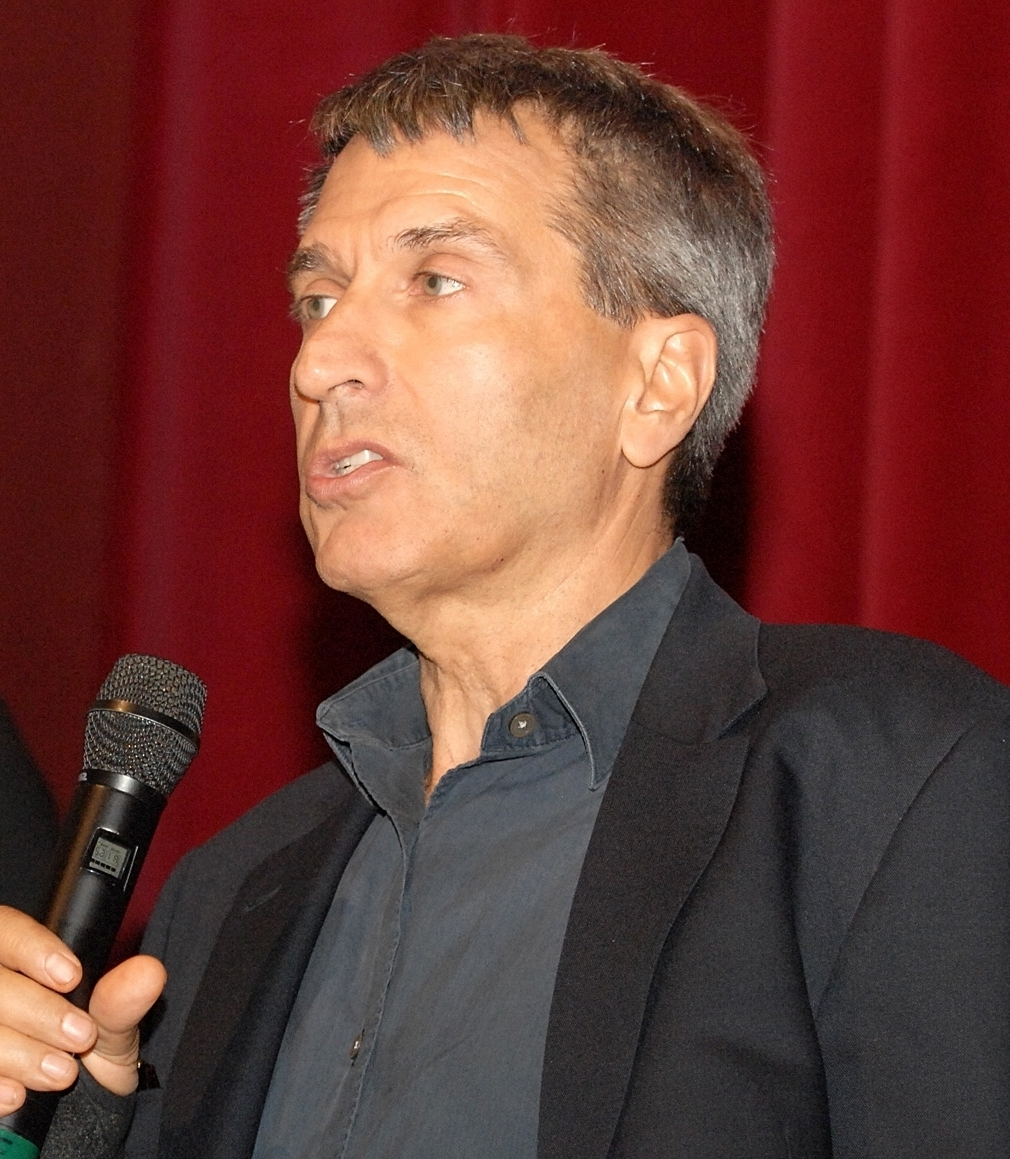
Director Nicholas Meyer (pictured in 2008) had never seen an episode of Star Trek when approached to direct the film and rewrite the script.

Karen Moore, a Paramount executive, suggested that Nicholas Meyer, writer of The Seven-Per-Cent Solution and director of Time After Time, could help resolve the screenplay issues. Meyer had also never seen an episode of Star Trek. He had the idea of making a list consisting of everything that the creative team had liked from the preceding drafts—"it could be a character, it could be a scene, it could be a plot, it could be a subplot, [...] it could be a line of dialogue"—so that he could use that list as the basis of a new screenplay made from all the best aspects of the previous ones. To offset fan expectation that Spock would die, Meyer had the character "killed" in the Kobayashi Maru simulator in the opening scene. The effects company required a completed script in just 12 days. Meyer wrote the screenplay uncredited and for no pay before the deadline, surprising the actors and producers, and rapidly produced subsequent rewrites as necessary. One draft, for example, had a baby in Khan's group, who is killed with the others in the Genesis detonation. Meyer later said:

The chief contribution I brought to Star Trek II was a healthy disrespect ... Star Trek was human allegory in a space format. That was both its strength and, ultimately, its weakness. I tried through irreverence to make them more human and a little less wooden. I didn't insist that Captain Kirk go to the bathroom, but did Star Trek have to be so sanctified?

Meyer described his script as "'Hornblower' in outer space", using nautical references and a swashbuckling atmosphere. (Hornblower was an inspiration to Roddenberry and Shatner when making the show, although Meyer was unaware of this.) Sallin was impressed with Meyer's vision for the film: "His ideas brought dimension that broadened the scope of the material as we were working on it." Gene Roddenberry disagreed with the script's naval texture and Khan's Captain Ahab undertones, but was mostly ignored by the creative team.

=== Design ===
Meyer attempted to change the look of Star Trek to match the nautical atmosphere he envisioned while staying within budget. The Enterprise, for example, was given a ship's bell, boatswain's call, and more blinking lights and signage. Meyer had a "No Smoking" sign added to the Enterprise's bridge, which he recalled "Everyone had a fit over [...] I said, 'Why, have they stopped smoking in the future? They've been smoking for four hundred years, you think it's going to stop in the next two?'" The sign appeared in the first shot of the film, but was removed for all others appearing in the final cut.

To save money on set design, production designer Joseph Jennings used existing elements from The Motion Picture that had been left standing after filming was completed. Sixty-five percent of the film was shot on the same set; the bridge of the Reliant and the "bridge simulator" from the opening scene were redresses of the Enterprise's bridge. The Klingon bridge from The Motion Picture was redressed as the Regula I transporter room and the Enterprise's torpedo bay. The filmmakers stretched The Wrath of Khan's budget by reusing models and footage from the first film, including footage of Enterprise in spacedock. The original ship miniatures were used where possible, or modified to stand in as new constructions. The orbital office complex from The Motion Picture was inverted and retouched to become the Regula I space station. Elements of the cancelled Star Trek: Phase II television show, such as bulkheads, railings, and sets, were cannibalized and reused. A major concern for the designers was that Reliant should be easily distinguishable from Enterprise. The ship's design was flipped after Bennett accidentally opened and approved the preliminary Reliant designs upside-down.

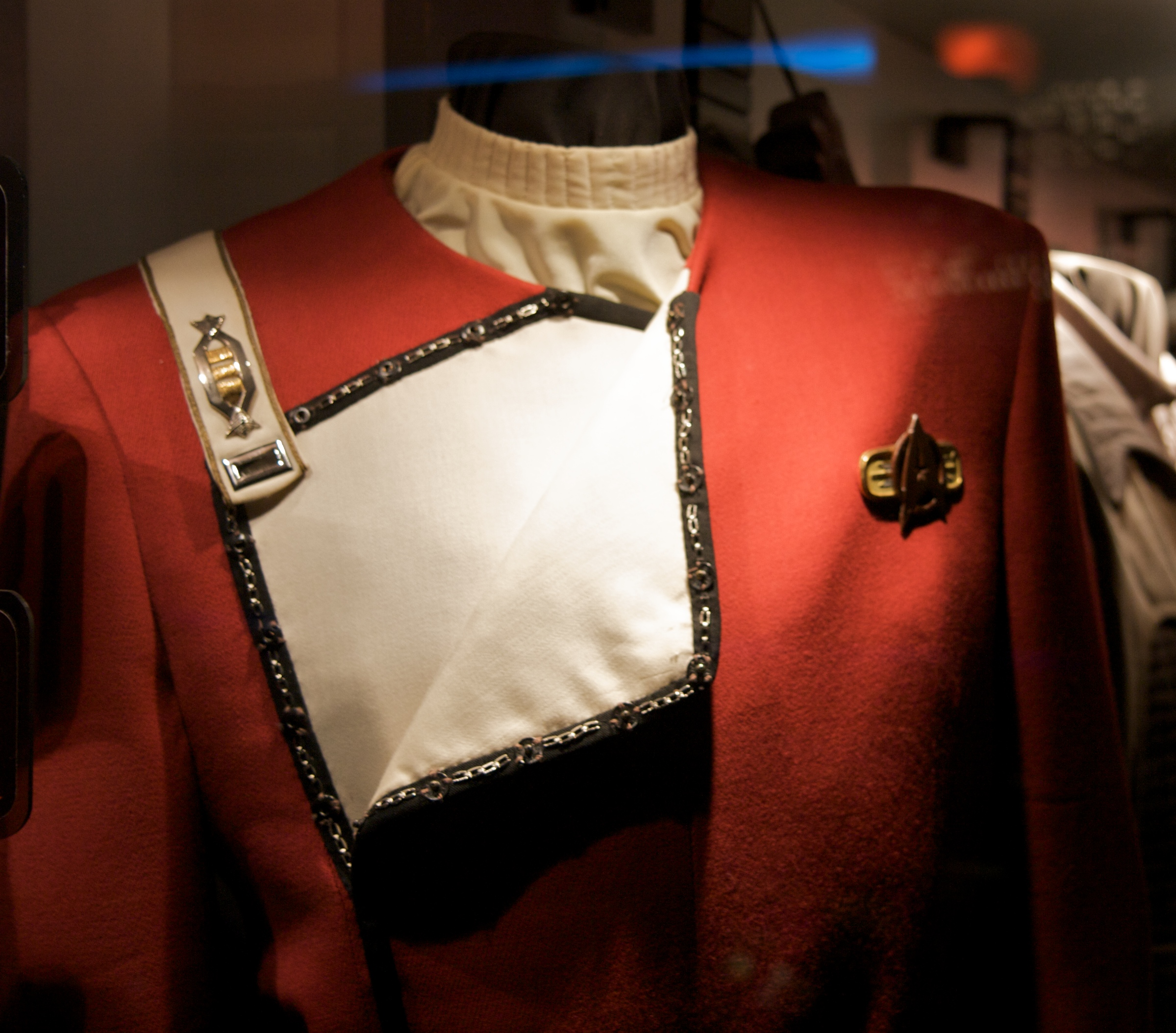
Uniform example from The Wrath of Khan on display at Star Trek: The Experience

Designer Robert Fletcher was brought in to redesign existing costumes and create new ones. Fletcher decided on a scheme of "corrupt colors", using materials with colors slightly off from the pure color. "They're not colors you see today, so in a subtle way [they] indicate another time." Meyer did not like the Starfleet uniforms from either the television series or The Motion Picture and wanted them changed, but could not be discarded entirely because of the budget. Dye tests of the fabric showed that the old uniforms took three colors well: blue-gray, gold, and dark red. Fletcher decided to use the dark red due to the strong contrast it provided with the background. The resulting naval-inspired designs would be used in Star Trek films until First Contact (1996). The first versions of the uniforms had stiff black collars, but Sallin suggested changing it to a turtleneck, using a form of vertical quilting called trapunto. The method creates a bas-relief effect to the material by stuffing the outlined areas with soft thread shot via air pressure through a hollow needle. By the time of The Wrath of Khan's production, the machines and needles needed to produce trapunto were rare, and Fletcher was only able to find one needle for the wardrobe department. The crew was so worried about losing or breaking the needle that one of the department's workers took it home with him as a security measure, leading Fletcher to think it had been stolen.

For Khan and his followers, Fletcher created a strong contrast with the highly organized Starfleet uniforms; his idea was that the exiles' costumes were made out of whatever they could find. Fletcher said, "My intention with Khan was to express the fact that they had been marooned on that planet with no technical infrastructure, so they had to cannibalize from the spaceship whatever they used or wore. Therefore, I tried to make it look as if they had dressed themselves out of pieces of upholstery and electrical equipment that composed the ship." Khan's costume was designed with an open chest to show Ricardo Montalbán's physique. Fletcher also designed smocks for the Regula I scientists, and civilian clothes for Kirk and McCoy that were designed to look practical and comfortable.

=== Filming ===
Principal photography began on November 9, 1981, and ended on January 29, 1982. The Wrath of Khan was more action-oriented than its predecessor, but less costly to make. The project was supervised by Paramount's television unit rather than its theatrical division. Bennett, a respected television veteran, made The Wrath of Khan on a budget of $12 million. The budget was initially lower at $8.5 million, but it rose when the producers were impressed by the first two weeks of footage. Meyer used camera and set tricks to spare the construction of large and expensive sets. For a scene taking place at Starfleet Academy, a forced perspective was created by placing scenery close to the camera to give the sense the set was larger than it really was. To present the illusion that the Enterprise's elevators moved between decks, corridor pieces were wheeled out of sight to change the hall configuration while the turbolift doors were closed. Background equipment such as computer terminals were rented when possible instead of purchased outright. Some designed props, such as a redesigned phaser and communicator, were vetoed by Paramount executives in favor of existing materials from The Motion Picture. Additional communicator props were built by John Zabrucky of Modern Props.

The Enterprise was refurbished for its space shots, with its shiny exterior dulled down and extra detail added to the frame. Compared to the newly built Reliant, the Enterprise was hated by the effects artists and cameramen; it took eight people to mount the model, and a forklift truck to move it. The Reliant, meanwhile, was lighter and had less complex internal wiring. The spaceship miniatures were photographed against a blue screen, which in post production allowed them to be composited with background scenery which had itself been photographed independently of the foreground miniatures. Any reflection of blue on the ship's hull would appear as a hole on the film; the gaps had to be patched frame by frame for the final film. The Dykstraflex motion control system was used for filming the miniature photography shots of the Enterprise and other ship exteriors.

The barren desert surface of Ceti Alpha V was simulated on stage 8, the largest sound stage at Paramount's studio. The set was elevated 25 feet off the ground and covered in wooden mats, over which tons of colored sand and powder were dumped. A cyclorama was painted and wrapped around the set, while massive industrial fans created a sandstorm. The filming was uncomfortable for actors and crew alike. The spandex environmental suits Koenig and Winfield wore were unventilated, and the actors had to signal by microphone when they needed air. Filming equipment was wrapped in plastic to prevent mechanical troubles and everyone on set wore boots, masks, and coveralls as protection from flying sand.

Spock's death was shot over three days, during which no visitors were allowed on set. Spock's death was to be irrevocable, but Nimoy had such a positive experience during filming that he asked if he could add a way for Spock to return in a later film. The mind meld sequence was initially filmed without Kelley's prior knowledge of what was going on. Shatner disagreed with having a clear glass separation between Spock and Kirk during the death scene; he instead wanted a translucent divider allowing viewers to see only Spock's silhouette, but his objection was overruled. During Spock's funeral sequence Meyer wanted the camera to track the torpedo that served as Spock's coffin as it was placed in a long trough and slid into the launcher. The camera crew thought the entire set would have to be rebuilt to accommodate the shot, but Sallin suggested putting a dolly into the trough and controlling it from above with an offset arm. Scott's rendition of "Amazing Grace" on the bagpipes was James Doohan's idea.

Spock's death in the film was widely reported during production. "Trekkies" wrote letters to protest, one paid for trade press advertisements urging Paramount to change the plot, and Nimoy even received death threats. Test audiences reacted badly to Spock's death and the film's ending's dark tone, so it was made more uplifting by Bennett. The scene of Spock's casket on the planet and Nimoy's closing monologue were added; Meyer objected, but did not stand in the way of the modifications. Nimoy did not know about the scene until he saw the film, but before it opened, the media reassured fans that "Spock will live" again. Due to time constraints, the casket scene was filmed in an overgrown corner of San Francisco's Golden Gate Park, using smoke machines to add a primal atmosphere. The shoot lasted from midday to evening, as the team was well aware there would be no time for reshoots.

Special consideration was given during filming to allow for integration of the planned special effects. Television monitors standing in for computer displays were specially calibrated so that their refresh rate did not result in banding on film. Due to a loss of resolution and quality resulting from rephotographing an element in an optical printer, live action sequences for effects were shot in 65mm or VistaVision formats to compensate. When the larger prints were reduced through an anamorphic lens on the printer, the result was a Panavision composite.

=== Effects ===
With a short timeframe to complete The Wrath of Khan's special effects sequences, effects supervisor Jim Veilleux, Meyer, Jennings, Sallin, and Minor worked to transform the written ideas for the script into concrete storyboards and visuals. The detailed sequences were essential to keep the film's effects from spiraling out of control and driving up costs, as had occurred with The Motion Picture. Each special and optical effect, and the duration of the sequences, was listed. By the end of six weeks, the producers determined the basic look and construction of nearly all the effects; the resulting shots were combined with film footage five months later. Industrial Light & Magic (ILM) produced many of the effects, and created the new models; the Reliant was the first non-Constitution-class Federation starship seen in the series. Originally, the Reliant was conceived as a Constitution-class starship identical to the Enterprise, but it was felt audiences would have difficulty distinguishing between two alike ships, especially during the battle scene in the Mutara Nebula. As the script called for the Reliant and Enterprise to inflict significant damage on each other, ILM developed techniques to illustrate the damage without physically harming the models. Rather than move the models on a bluescreen during shooting, the VistaVision camera was panned and tracked to give the illusion of movement. Damage to the Enterprise was cosmetic, and simulated with pieces of aluminum that were colored or peeled off. Phaser damage was created using stop motion. The script called for large-scale damage to the Reliant, so larger versions of the ship's model were created to be blown up.

Enterprise (left) maneuvers away from the severely damaged Reliant in the Mutara Nebula. The sparks coming from Reliant's nacelle were hand-animated, frame by frame.

The battle in the nebula was a difficult sequence to accomplish without the aid of computer-generated models. The swirling nebula was created by injecting a latex rubber and ammonia mixture into a cloud tank filled with fresh and salt water. All the footage was shot at two frames per second to give the illusion of faster movement. The vibrant abstract colors of the nebula were simulated by lighting the tank using colored gels. Additional light effects such as auroras were created by the ILM animation department. The ships were combined with the nebula background plates via bluescreen mattes to complete the shot. The destruction of the Reliant's engine nacelle was created by superimposing shots of the engine blowing apart and explosions over the model.

The scene in which Terrell kills Jedda, a Regula scientist, by vaporizing him with a phaser was filmed in two takes. Winfield and the related actors first played out the scene; this footage became the background plate. A blue screen was wheeled onto the set and actor John Vargas, the recipient of the phaser blast, acted out his response to being hit with the energy weapon. A phaser beam element was placed on top of the background plate, and Vargas' shots were optically dissolved into an airbrushed disintegration effect which matched Vargas' position in every frame.

The Ceti eel shots used several models, overseen by visual effects supervisor Ken Ralston, who had just finished creature design for Return of the Jedi. He tied a string to the eels to inch the models across the actors' faces before they entered the ear canal. The scene of a more mature eel leaving Chekov's ear was simulated by threading a microfilament through the floor of the set up to Koenig's ear. The scene was filmed with three variations, which Ralston described as "a dry shot, one with some blood, and the Fangoria shot, with a lot of gore." Footage of a giant model of Koenig's ear was discarded from the theatrical release due to the visceral reaction it elicited in test audiences.

Additional optical effects were provided by Visual Concept Engineering (VCE), a small effects company headed by Peter Kuran; Kuran had previously worked at ILM and left after finishing The Empire Strikes Back. VCE provided effects including phaser beams, the Enterprise reactor, additional sand on Ceti Alpha V, and an updated transporter effect. Meyer and the production staff were adamant about not using freeze frames for the transporter, as had been done in the original television series. Scenes were shot so that conversations would continue while characters were in mid-transport, although much of the matte work VCE created was discarded when the production decided not to have as much action during transports. Computer graphics company Evans & Sutherland used the computer graphics-based Digistar planetarium system to generate the fields of stars, based on a database of real stars. The models of the ships were composited atop the star fields. The Evans & Sutherland team also produced the vector graphics tactical displays seen on the Enterprise and the simulator bridge.

The Wrath of Khan was one of the first films to extensively use computer graphics to improve the visual quality and production speed of special effects shots. Among the film's technical achievements was cinema's first entirely computer-generated sequence, ILM's animation for the demonstration of the effects of the Genesis Device on a barren planet.

CGI was used for the first time in this shot of the Genesis Device striking a planet

The first concept for the shot took the form of a laboratory demonstration, where a rock would be placed in a chamber and turned into a flower. Veilleux suggested the sequence's scope be expanded to show the Genesis effect taking over a planet. While Paramount appreciated the more dramatic presentation, they wanted the simulation to be more impressive than traditional animation. Having seen research done by Lucasfilm's computer graphics group, Veilleux offered them the task. Introducing the novel technique of particle systems for the sixty-second sequence, the graphics team paid attention to detail such as ensuring that the stars visible in the background matched those visible from a real star light-years from Earth. The animators hoped it would serve as a "commercial" for the studio's talents. The studio would later branch off from Lucasfilm to form Pixar.

=== Music ===
Jerry Goldsmith had composed the music for The Motion Picture, but was not an option for The Wrath of Khan given the reduced budget; Meyer's composer for Time After Time, Miklós Rózsa, was likewise prohibitively expensive. Bennett and Meyer wanted the music for the film to go in a different direction, but had not decided on a composer by the time filming began. Meyer initially hoped to hire an associate named John Morgan, but Morgan lacked film experience, which would have troubled the studio.

Paramount's vice-president of music Joel Sill took a liking to a 28-year-old composer named James Horner, feeling that his demo tapes stood out from generic film music. Horner was introduced to Bennett, Meyer and Sallin. Horner said that "[The producers] did not want the kind of score they had gotten before. They did not want a John Williams score, per se. They wanted something different, more modern." When asked about how he landed the assignment, the composer replied that "the producers loved my work for Wolfen, and had heard my music for several other projects, and I think, so far as I've been told, they liked my versatility very much. I wanted the assignment, and I met with them, we all got along well, they were impressed with my music, and that's how it happened." Horner agreed with the producers' expectations and agreed to begin work in mid-January 1982.

In keeping with the nautical tone, Meyer wanted music evocative of seafaring and swashbuckling, and the director and composer worked together closely, becoming friends in the process. As a classical music fan, Meyer was able to describe the effects and sounds he wanted in the music. While Horner's style was described as "echoing both the bombastic and elegiac elements of John Williams' Star Wars and Goldsmith's original Star Trek (The Motion Picture) scores," Horner was expressly told to not use any of Goldsmith's score. Instead Horner adapted the opening fanfare of Alexander Courage's Star Trek television theme. "The fanfare draws you in immediately — you know you're going to get a good movie," Horner said.

In comparison to the flowing main theme, Khan's leitmotif was designed as a percussive texture that could be overlaid with other music and emphasized the character's insanity. The seven-note brass theme was echoplexed to emphasize the character's ruminations about the past while on Ceti Alpha V, but does not play fully until Reliant's attack on the Enterprise. Many elements drew from Horner's previous work (a rhythm that accompanies Khan's theme during the surprise attack borrows from an attack theme from Wolfen, in turn influenced by Goldsmith's score for Alien). Musical moments from the original television series are also heard during investigation of the Regula space station and elsewhere.

To Horner, the "stuff underneath" the main story was what needed to be addressed by the score; in The Wrath of Khan, this was the relationship between Kirk and Spock. The main theme serves as Kirk's theme, with a mellower section following that is the theme for the Starship Enterprise. Horner also wrote a motif for Spock, to emphasize the character's depth: "By putting a theme over Spock, it warms him and he becomes three-dimensional rather than a collection of schticks." The difference in the short, French horn-based cues for the villain and longer melodies for the heroes helped to differentiate characters and ships during the battle sequences.

The soundtrack was Horner's first major film score, and was written in four and a half weeks. The resulting 72 minutes of music was then performed by the 91-piece Hollywood Studio Symphony. Recording sessions for the score began on April 12, 1982, at the Warner Bros. lot, The Burbank Studios and continued until April 15. A pickup session was held on April 30 to record music for the Mutara nebula battle, while another session held on May 3 was used to cover the recently changed epilogue. Horner used synthesizers for ancillary effects; at the time, science fiction films such as E.T. the Extra-Terrestrial and The Thing were eschewing the synthesizer in favor of more traditional orchestras. Craig Huxley performed his invented instrument—the Blaster beam—during recording, as well as composing and performing electronic music for the Genesis Project video. While most of the film was "locked in" by the time Horner had begun composing music, he had to change musical cue orchestration after the integration of special effects caused changes in scene durations.

== Themes ==
The Wrath of Khan features several recurring themes, including death, resurrection, and growing old. Upon writing his script, Meyer hit upon a link between Spock's death and the age of the characters. "This was going to be a story in which Spock died, so it was going to be a story about death, and it was only a short hop, skip, and a jump to realize that it was going to be about old age and friendship," Meyer said. "I don't think that any of [the other preliminary] scripts were about old age, friendship, and death." In keeping with the theme of death and rebirth symbolized by Spock's sacrifice and the Genesis Device, Meyer wanted to call the film The Undiscovered Country, in reference to Prince Hamlet's description of death in William Shakespeare's Hamlet. However, during editing, Paramount changed the title to Vengeance of Khan without consulting with Meyer or the producers. Meyer disliked the new title; it was later changed to Wrath of Khan at Lucasfilm's request due to a conflict with their forthcoming Revenge of the Jedi (renamed Return of the Jedi late in production).

Meyer added elements to reinforce the aging of the characters. Kirk's unhappiness about his birthday is compounded by McCoy's gift of reading glasses. The script stated that Kirk was 49, but Shatner was unsure about being specific about Kirk's age. Bennett remembers that Shatner was hesitant about portraying a middle-aged version of himself, and believed that with proper makeup he could continue playing a younger Kirk. Bennett convinced Shatner that he could age gracefully like Spencer Tracy; the producer did not know that Shatner had worked with Tracy on Judgment at Nuremberg (1961), and was fond of the actor. Meyer made sure to emphasize Kirk's parallel to Sherlock Holmes in that both characters waste away in the absence of their stimuli; new cases, in Holmes' case, and starship adventures in Kirk's.

Khan's pursuit of Kirk is central to the film's theme of vengeance, and The Wrath of Khan deliberately borrows heavily from Herman Melville's Moby-Dick. To make the parallels clear to viewers, Meyer added a visible copy of Moby-Dick to Khan's dwelling. Khan liberally paraphrases Ahab, with "I'll chase him round the moons of Nibia and round the Antares maelstrom and round perdition's flames before I give him up!" Khan quotes Ahab's tirade at the end of the novel verbatim with his final lines: "To the last I grapple with thee; from Hell's heart I stab at thee; for hate's sake, I spit my last breath at thee."

== Release ==
The film's novelization, written by Vonda N. McIntyre, stayed on the New York Times paperback bestsellers list for more than three weeks. Unlike the previous film, Wrath of Khan was not promoted with a toy line, although Playmates Toys created Khan and Saavik figures in the 1990s, and in 2007 Art Asylum crafted a full series of action figures to mark the film's 25th anniversary. In 2009, IDW Publishing released a comic adaptation of the film, and Film Score Monthly released an expanded score.

The Wrath of Khan opened on June 4, 1982, in 1,621 theaters in the United States. It made $14,347,221 in its opening weekend, at the time the largest opening weekend gross in history. It went on to earn $78,912,963 in the US, becoming the sixth highest-grossing film of 1982. It made $97,000,000 worldwide. Although the total gross of The Wrath of Khan was less than that of The Motion Picture, it was more profitable due to its much lower production cost.

== Reception ==
After the lukewarm reaction to the first film, critical and fan response to The Wrath of Khan were positive. The film's success was credited with renewing interest in the franchise. Marc Bernardin of Entertainment Weekly went further, calling The Wrath of Khan "the film that, by most accounts, saved Star Trek as we know it"; it is now considered one of the best films in the series. Pauline Kael of The New Yorker called the film "wonderful dumb fun." Gene Siskel gave the film three and a half stars out of four, calling it "a flat-out winner, full of appealing characters in engaging relationships in a futuristic film that has a delightfully old-fashioned sense of majesty about its characters and the predicaments they get into."

The film's pacing was praised by reviewers in The New York Times and The Washington Post as being much swifter than its predecessor and closer to that of the television series. Janet Maslin of The New York Times credited the film with a stronger story than The Motion Picture and stated the sequel was everything the first film should have been. Variety agreed that The Wrath of Khan was closer to the original spirit of Star Trek than its predecessor. Strong character interaction was cited as a strong feature of the film, as was Montalbán's portrayal of Khan. In 2016, Playboy ranked the film number four on its list of 15 Sequels That Are Way Better Than The Originals. Popular Mechanics would later rate Spock's death the tenth greatest scene in science fiction.

Roger Ebert of the Chicago Sun-Times and Derek Adams of Time Out complained about what were seen as tepid battle sequences and perceived melodrama. While Ebert and TV Guide felt that Spock's death was dramatic and well-handled, The Washington Post's Gary Arnold stated Spock's death "feels like an unnecessary twist, and the filmmakers are obviously well-prepared to fudge in case the public demands another sequel". Negative reviews of the film focused on some of the acting, and Empire singled out the "dodgy coiffures" and "Santa Claus tunics" as elements of the film that had not aged well.

Christopher John reviewed Star Trek II: The Wrath of Khan in Ares Magazine No. 13 and commented that "By not taking itself so seriously – that is, realizing the film should be an action adventure with elements of pathos and philosophy gently added – The Wrath of Khan succeeded brilliantly. For those who loved the series, it was a dream come true (to such an extent that many refuse to acknowledge the existence of the first film as part of the Star Trek epos)."

The Wrath of Khan won two Saturn Awards in 1982, for best actor (Shatner) and best direction (Meyer). The film was also nominated in the "best dramatic presentation" category for the 1983 Hugo Awards, but lost to Blade Runner. The Wrath of Khan has influenced later movies: Meyer's rejected title for the film, The Undiscovered Country, was finally put to use when Meyer directed the sixth film, which retained the nautical influences. Director Bryan Singer cited the film as an influence on X2 and his abandoned sequel to Superman Returns. The film is also a favorite of director J. J. Abrams, producer Damon Lindelof, and writers Roberto Orci and Alex Kurtzman, the creative team behind the franchise relaunch film Star Trek. Abrams' second entry in the relaunched film series, Star Trek Into Darkness, drew significantly from Wrath of Khan.

In December 2024, the film was deemed "culturally, historically, or aesthetically significant" by the United States Library of Congress and selected for preservation in the United States National Film Registry.

Review aggregator Rotten Tomatoes reports that 86% of 73 critics have given the film a positive review, recording an average score of 8.1/10.

== Home media ==
Paramount released The Wrath of Khan on RCA CED Videodisc in 1982 and on VHS and Betamax in 1983. The studio sold the VHS for $39.95, $40 below contemporary movie cassette prices and it sold a record 120,000 copies. The successful experiment was credited with instigating more competitive VHS pricing, an increase in the adoption of increasingly cheaper VHS players, and an industry-wide move away from rentals to sales as the bulk of videotape revenue.

Paramount released The Wrath of Khan on DVD in 2000; no special features were included on the disc. Montalbán drew hundreds of fans of the film to Universal City, California where he signed copies of the DVD to commemorate its release. In August 2002, the film was re-released in a two-disc "Director's Edition" format. In addition to remastered picture quality and 5.1 Dolby surround sound, the DVD set included director commentary, cast interviews, storyboards and the theatrical trailer. The expanded cut of the film was given a Hollywood premiere before the release of the DVD. Meyer stated that he didn't believe directors' cuts of films were necessarily better than the original but that the re-release gave him a chance to add elements that had been removed from the theatrical release by Paramount. The four hours of bonus content and expanded director's cut were favorably received.

The film's original theatrical cut was released on Blu-ray Disc in May 2009 to coincide with the new Star Trek feature, along with the other five films featuring the original crew in Star Trek: Original Motion Picture Collection. Of all six original films, Wrath of Khan was the only one to be remastered in 1080p high-definition from the original negative. Nicholas Meyer stated that the Wrath of Khan negative "was in terrible shape," which is why it needed extensive restoration. All six films in the set have new 7.1 Dolby TrueHD audio. The disc also features a new commentary track by director Nicholas Meyer and Star Trek: Enterprise showrunner Manny Coto. On April 24, 2016, Paramount Pictures announced the Director's Edition of the film would be released for Blu-ray Disc on June 7, 2016. On July 7, 2021, it was announced that the first four films in the Star Trek franchise (including both the theatrical cut and the Director's Edition of The Wrath of Khan) would be released on 4K Ultra HD Blu-ray on September 7 of that year to commemorate the franchise's 55th anniversary, alongside individual remastered Blu-rays of the same films.

== See also ==
- Star Trek film series
- List of films featuring extraterrestrials
- List of films featuring space stations
