= Conqueror A.D. 1086 =

1995 video game

- Cover art of Conqueror A.D. 1086
- Developer: Software Sorcery
- Publisher: Sierra On-Line
- Platforms: MS-DOS, Microsoft Windows
- Release: NA: 1995; EU: 1995
- Genre: Strategy
- Mode: Single-player

Conqueror A.D. 1086 is a medieval strategy computer game released in 1995 by Sierra On-Line, Inc.

== Gameplay ==
The player must control a lord as he tries to develop an army of knights and soldiers in order to challenge the king for the throne of England. Travelling on the medieval roads is not like traveling on today's superhighways (and requires months to get from one end of England to the other). Rivers also provide a quick path to get to the target village but the player must watch out for bandits that will attack him and his hired men. Starting the game as a 12-year-old boy, you are given only some money and a basic sword. The player can either answer a variety of moral questions or choose a pre-generated character.

At the age of 18, the player is assigned a fiefdom to oversee in addition to a substantial amount of land. All games end at the player's 30th birthday. If the player doesn't slay a dragon or overthrow the King of England by then, the game is considered to be lost. While not fighting in battles or tournaments, the player can develop his fiefs with agricultural and civic developments similar to SimCity; examples of these buildings include chapels, stables, storehouses, and farms. Marriage is also possible as the player can acquire his wife through socializing with the ladies prior to the jousting. The moneylender can provide the player with loans at 50% interest.

== Reception ==
Reception

Review scores
Publication	Score
Computer Game Review	66/100 (Note: In Computer Game Review, three critics gave Conqueror A.D. 1086 different scores: 60, 58, and 79.)
Hyper	60/100

Computer Game Review argued, "The scope of this project was more than either its budget or its talent could handle."
