= Mind War =

- Babylon 5 episode
- Episode no.: Season 1 Episode 6
- Directed by: Bruce Seth Green
- Written by: J. Michael Straczynski
- Production code: 110
- Original air date: March 2, 1994

Guest appearances
- William Allen Young as Jason Ironheart; Felicity Waterman as Kelsey; Julia Nickson as Catherine Sakai; Walter Koenig as Bester

Episode chronology
← Previous "The Parliament of Dreams"	Next → "The War Prayer"

"Mind War" is the sixth episode of the first season of the science fiction television series, Babylon 5. The episode deals with the arrival on the station of a telekinetically-enhanced fugitive telepath fleeing from Psi Corps experimentation, and introduces the Psi Cop Alfred Bester, who leads the manhunt.

== Plot ==
Jason Ironheart, Talia Winters' old instructor at Psi-Corps, arrives at Babylon 5, having recently evaded capture. Psi-Corps agents Alfred Bester and his assistant Kelsey arrive shortly thereafter, and meet with Sinclair, Ivanova, and Winters, warning them that Ironheart is aboard and they need to perform a manhunt for them. To verify that Winters has not yet met him, Bester and Kelsey put Winters under an intense mind probe, but find no contact. Sinclair asks Bester if there is any danger to the station from Ironheart, but Bester tells him not to worry.

Ironheart contacts Winters and asks her to visit. In his guest quarters, he explains that he is an advanced test subject from Psi-Corps, an attempt to raise the telepathic abilities of humans well beyond any known levels. The experimentation they performed on him gave him advanced telekinesis, for which he believes that Psi-Corps wants to use him as a secret assassin. However, his abilities are growing beyond his control, and as he speaks to Winters, he suffers a "mind quake", shaking the nearby area violently. He begs Winters to leave, after which he creates a psychic barrier around his quarters and several sections around it. Alerted to the situation, Sinclair accosts Bester in lying to him because several people were wounded by the mind quake.

Some time later, Winters convinces Ironheart to let her in. Ironheart warns Talia that he cannot control his powers and must leave the station. Winters discreetly relays this to Sinclair, who agrees to meet with Ironheart; after hearing his story, Sinclair agrees to help him escape. He has security clear a path to the docking bay, but Bester learns of this and attempts to stop them. As both Bester and Kelsey places Ironheart under a psychic assault, but Ironheart resists and uses his powers to psychically destroy Kelsey and reduce her to dust. Sinclair knocks Bester out, giving Winters time to escort Ironheart to his ship. Once launched, Ironheart's powers fully transform him into an ethereal being. He thanks Sinclair for his help and gives Winters a "gift" before his form departs. Later, Sinclair convinces Bester to lie in his report by stating that Ironheart was killed in his ship, threatening that he would otherwise reveal how Bester endangered the station and how his acts lead to Kelsey's death. In her quarters, Winters finds she is now capable of simple telekinesis.

Meanwhile, Catherine Sakai is told of a planet named Sigma 957 which an excavation company would like a survey of, willing to pay her a handsome sum for it. As she prepares, Narn ambassador G'Kar warns her not to go, as the planet is inhospitable and dangerous, but she goes anyway. When she arrives, a huge, unidentifiable ship passes hers in orbit before disappearing, and her ship loses power, causing her orbit to decay. However, she is rescued in time by two Narn fighters summoned to help her by G'Kar. Back on Babylon 5 she asks G'Kar why he helped, and he says he had a good reason, without explaining much further. She also asks about the strange ship, and he compares her encounter to that of an ant being picked up by a human – incomprehensible for the ant, not worthy of attention for the human.

== Production, visual and sound effects ==
=== Characters, cast and filming ===
Actor Walter Koenig, who played the recurring role of Psi Cop Alfred Bester, is best known for he portrayal of Pavel Chekov in the original Star Trek series and films. Koenig was originally offered the role of Knight Two in the episode 'And the Sky full of Stars', but was unable to do so because of health issues. Koenig was shifted to the role of Bester in this episode, with the character being specifically written with Koenig in mind. Straczynski had seen Koenig's theater work, and felt that Koenig had been typecast as Chekov. Koenig's performance as Bester was so well received that Bester – intended to be a one-off appearance – became a recurring character, with Koenig becoming a semi-regular cast member. Bester is named after Alfred Bester, who had been a friend of series conceptual consultant Harlan Ellison, and author of The Demolished Man, a futuristic novel featuring a telepathic police force.

In the scene where Bester and Kelsey confront Commander Sinclair and Talia Winters, as they escort Ironheart through the Zocolo, actress Andrea Thompson, playing Winters, arranged to add in part of the scene which wasn't in the script. Thompson felt that it was unnatural that she would just stand and watch when Ironheart was being attacked: "I had to fight for that moment... I said, 'Here's the love of her life, and they're attacking him, and she's not going to jump in there? And then they said, 'No, she wouldn't because she knows she'll be killed." But I said, "Don't you realize love overcomes all that?"

In the final scene, Talia discovers that Ironheart had left her the gift of telekinesis. Straczynski originally had planned to use these powers later in the series. The way that Thompson played this final scene was inspired by her recently becoming pregnant with her child with her real-life partner, co-star Jerry Doyle. She reflected, "When I first found out that Jerry and I were expecting. It's a magical gift, but at the same time, you're terribly afraid. It's all about the unknown, and you have that sense that your life is changing, that something has happened, you can never turn back."

The character of Catherine Sakai was played by Julia Nickson. Catherine Sakai previously appeared in The Parliament of Dreams, and would make a final series appearance in Chrysalis. Catherine Sakai also features in Kathryn M. Drennan's novel, To Dream in the City of Sorrows.

Jason Ironheart was played by William Allen Young, an actor and director who has starred in numerous television, stage, and film projects, including two Academy Award-nominated films, A Soldier's Story and District 9. At the end of the episode, when he transforms into an energy-like state, Ironheart says, "I'll see you in a million years", which is a timeframe which has significance at the end of the series.

Bester's aide Kelsey was played by English actress Felicity Waterman, who played Vanessa Hunt in the series Knots Landing; and played Lt. Abigail Hawling on the series Pensacola: Wings of Gold. In the scene when Kelsey threatens Ironheart, he tells her, "You cannot harm one who has dreamed a dream like mine." This line is a prayer for protection from enemies from the Ojibwe culture.

=== Visual effects ===
The Babylon 5 makeup department involved in this episode – consisting of Everett Burrell, Greg Funk, Mary Kay Morse, Ron Pipes and John Vulich – won the 1994 Emmy Award for Outstanding Individual Achievement in Makeup for a Series for the previous episode, "The Parliament of Dreams"

For its visual effects scenes, Babylon 5 pioneered the use of computer-generated imagery (CGI) in a television series. This also enabled motion effects which are difficult to create using models, such as the rotation of fighter craft along multiple axes, or the rotation and banking of a virtual camera. The visual effects were created by Foundation Imaging using Commodore Amiga computers with LightWave 3D software.

The scenes of the rail car travelling through the interior of the station were created by effects designer Eric Chauvin. The production team built a set of the rail car, which was filmed in front of blue screen, and the core background was rendered and composited by Chauvin.

The Starfury fighter design seen in the episode was designed by Steve Burg as a plausible zero-gravity fighter. The positioning of the four engine pods at the extremities of the craft was inspired by Ron Cobb's design for the Gunstar fighter from The Last Starfighter. The basic shape of the Starfury's wings was inspired by an earlier unused design by Burg for a military robot fighting machine, which he had originally designed for Terminator 2. This was merged with the multi-engined configuration to form the Starfury design. Burg points out that the wings/struts were not aerodynamic: they were there to lever the engines away from the center of mass.

=== Music ===
Music for the title sequence and the episode was provided by the series’ composer, Christopher Franke. Franke developed themes for each of the main characters, the station, for space in general, and for the alien races, endeavoring to carry a sense of the character of each race.

== Reviews ==
Rowan Kaiser, writing in The A.V. Club, identifies transcendence as a key theme of the episode. He singles out an exchange between Ironheart and Talia: "'I am becoming.' 'Becoming what?' 'Everything.' And he does. The episode ends with him becoming an awkward CGI energy being, essentially a god." Kaiser also notes that how G'Kar describes the beings at Sigma 957 is going to apply equally to Ironheart.

Elias Rosner, writing in Multiversity Comics, highlights the performance of Walter Koenig as Bester. Rosner writes, "He does a great job of making telepathy and, well, everything look menacing and shady. He's transparently evil but not in a way that's cliché or over-the-top. You never know if he's hiding around a corner, listening in, and he makes sure you know that. He's the right amount of cold evil and gives just the best deliveries of the episode. He is Bester."

Jules-Pierre Malartre, writing in the science fiction review site, Den of Geek, notes that the episode is "heavy on sci-fi and social issues" and deals with concepts such as "equality and the potential of human evolution". Malartre also highlights Walter Koenig's performance as Bester: "Babylon 5 would produce a number of villains over the course of its five seasons, but Bester comes out as the best of the lot, thanks in great part to Koenig's unique performance, at once charismatic and chilling."
