= List of science fiction television programs by genre =

This is an inclusive list of science fiction television programs classified by genre.

== Listing by genre ==
=== Aliens on Earth ===
- Extraterrestrials in fiction
- 3rd Rock from the Sun (1996–2001)
- ALF (franchise):
  - ALF: The Animated Series (1987–1989, ALF spin-off, animated)
  - Project ALF (1996, ALF sequel, film)
  - ALF (1986–1990)
- Alien Nation (franchise):
  - Alien Nation (1989–1990)
  - Alien Nation: Dark Horizon (1990, first film)
  - Alien Nation: Body and Soul (1995, second film)
  - Alien Nation: Millennium (1996, third film)
  - Alien Nation: The Enemy Within (1996, fourth film)
  - Alien Nation: The Udara Legacy (1997, fifth film)
- Alienators: Evolution Continues (2001–2002, US, animated) a.k.a. Evolution: the Animated Series (UK)
- American Horror Story: Asylum (2012–2013)
- Andro-Jäger, Der (1982–1984, Germany)
- Ben 10 (franchise):
  - Ben 10 (2005–2008, animated)
  - Ben 10: Secret of the Omnitrix (2007, animated, film)
  - Ben 10: Race Against Time (2007, film)
  - Ben 10: Alien Force (2008–2010, animated)
  - Ben 10: Alien Swarm (2009, film)
  - Ben 10: Ultimate Alien (2010–2012, animated)
  - Ben 10: Destroy All Aliens a.k.a. Ben 10: Alien Dimensions (2012, film, animated)
  - Ben 10: Omniverse (2012–2014, animated)
  - Ben 10 (2016–2021, animated)
- Code Name: Eternity (1999–2000, Canada)
- Cybergirl (2001–2002, Australia)
- Defiance (2013–2015)
- Doctor Who (franchise):
  - Doctor Who (1963–1989, 1996, 2005–present, UK)
  - K-9 and Company (1981, UK, Doctor Who spin-off, pilot)
  - A Fix with Sontarans (1985, UK, segment)
  - Dimensions in Time (1993, UK, special, crossover)
  - P.R.O.B.E. (1994–1996, UK, Doctor Who spin-offs, films):
    - Zero Imperative, The (1994, UK, Doctor Who spin-off, film)
    - Devil of Winterborne, The (1995, UK, Doctor Who spin-off, film)
    - Unnatural Selection (1996, UK, Doctor Who spin-off, film)
    - Ghosts of Winterborne (1996, UK, Doctor Who spin-off, film)
  - Doctor Who and the Curse of Fatal Death a.k.a. The Curse of Fatal Death (1999, UK, special)
  - Doctor Who: Children in Need a.k.a. Born Again (2005, UK, special)
  - Attack of the Graske (2005, UK, interactive mini-episode)
  - Torchwood (2006–2011, UK, Doctor Who spin-off):
    - Torchwood: Children of Earth (2009, miniseries, third season)
    - Torchwood: Miracle Day (2011, fourth season)
  - Totally Doctor Who (2006–2007, UK)
  - Sarah Jane Adventures, The (2007–2011, UK, Doctor Who spin-off)
  - Time Crash (2007, UK, mini-episode)
  - Doctor Who: The Infinite Quest (2007, UK, animated)
  - Music of the Spheres (2009, UK, mini-episode)
  - Doctor Who: Tonight's the Night (2009, UK, special)
  - Doctor Who: Dreamland (2009, UK, animated)
  - K-9 (2009–2010, UK/Australia, Doctor Who spin-off)
- Dork Hunters from Outer Space (2008–2009, UK/Germany, animated) IMDb
- Event, The (2010–2011)
- Gabby Duran & the Unsittables (2019-2021)
- Hard Time on Planet Earth (1989)
- Human Kind Of (2018, animated)
- Invader Zim (2001–2002, 2006, animated)
- Lilo & Stitch (franchise):
  - Lilo & Stitch: The Series (2003–2006, animated)
  - Stitch! (2008–2011, Japan, animated)
- Marvin Marvin (2012–2013)
- Men in Black: The Series a.k.a. Men in Black: The Animated Series a.k.a. MIB: The Series (1997–2001, animated)
- Monsters vs. Aliens (franchise):
  - B.O.B.'s Big Break (2009, Monsters vs. Aliens spin-off, short film, animated)
  - Monsters vs. Aliens: Mutant Pumpkins from Outer Space (2009, Monsters vs. Aliens spin-off, special, animated)
  - Night of the Living Carrots (2011, Monsters vs. Aliens spin-off, Monsters vs. Aliens: Mutant Pumpkins from Outer Space sequel, special, animated)
  - Monsters vs. Aliens a.k.a. MvA (2013–2014, Monsters vs. Aliens spin-off, animated)
- Mork & Mindy (1978–1982)
- My Favorite Martian (franchise):
  - My Favorite Martian (1963–1966)
  - My Favorite Martians (1973–1975, animated)
- The Neighbors (2012–2014)
- Ocean Girl (1994–1998, Australia) a.k.a. Ocean Odyssey (UK)
- Phoenix, The (1982)
- Planet Lulin (2024, Australia)
- Powers of Matthew Star, The (1982–1983)
- Pretty Cure (franchise):
  - HappinessCharge PreCure! (2014-2015, Japan)
  - Star Twinkle PreCure (2019-2020, Japan)
- Resident Alien (2021–present)
- Roswell (1994, film)
- Roswell Conspiracies: Aliens, Myths and Legends (1999–2000, animated)
- Roswell (franchise):
  - Roswell (1999–2002)
  - Roswell, New Mexico (2019–2022)
- Sgt. Frog (2004–2011, Japan, animated)
- Solar Opposites (2020–present, animated)
- Star-Crossed (2014)
- Starman (1986–1987)
- Superman (franchise):
  - Adventures of Superman (1952–1958)
  - Adventures of Superboy, The (1961, pilot)
  - New Adventures of Superman, The (1966–1970, animated)
  - Superman/Aquaman Hour of Adventure, The (1967–1968, animated)
  - Superman (1988, animated)
  - Superboy a.k.a. Adventures of Superboy, The (1988–1992)
  - Lois & Clark: The New Adventures of Superman (1993–1997)
  - Superman: The Animated Series (1996–2000, animated)
  - Smallville (2001–2011)
  - Krypto the Superdog (2005–2006, animated)
  - Superman & Lois (2021–present)
- Something Is Out There (1988)
- Steven Universe (franchise)
  - Steven Universe (2013–2019, animated)
  - Steven Universe: The Movie (2019, film, animated)
  - Steven Universe Future (2019–2020, animated)
- Taken (2002, miniseries)
- The Strangerers (2000)
- Tracker (2001–2002)
- Under the Mountain (1981–1982, New Zealand, miniseries)
- Widget (1990–1991, animated)

=== Alien invasion ===
- Alienators: Evolution Continues (2001–2002, US, animated) a.k.a. Evolution: the Animated Series (UK)
- Big Pull, The (1962, UK)
- BrainDead (2016)
- Captain Scarlet (franchise):
  - Captain Scarlet and the Mysterons (1967–1968, UK, puppetry)
  - Captain Scarlet vs the Mysterons (1980, Captain Scarlet and the Mysterons compilation, puppetry, film)
  - Revenge of the Mysterons from Mars (1981, Captain Scarlet and the Mysterons compilation, puppetry, film)
  - New Captain Scarlet (2005, UK, animated)
- Code Name: Eternity (1999–2000, Canada)
- Colony (2015–2018)
- Coneheads, The (1983, animated) IMDb
- Dark Skies (1996–1997)
- Earth: Final Conflict (1997–2002)
- Falling Skies (2011–2015)
- Family's Defensive Alliance, The (2001, Japan, animated)
- First Wave (1998–2001, Canada/US)
- Fist of the North Star (franchise):
  - Fist of the North Star (1984–1987, Japan, animated)
  - Fist of the North Star 2 (1987–1988, Japan, animated)
  - Legends of the Dark King: A Fist of the North Star Story (2008, Japan, animated)
- Hunters (2016)
- Invaders, The (1967–1968)
- Invaders from Space (1964, film)
- Invasion (1997, film)
- Invasion (2005–2006)
- Invasion (2021–present)
- Invasion America (1998, miniseries, animated)
- Invasion: Earth (1998, UK)
- Kamen Rider (franchise):
  - Kamen Rider (1971–1973, Japan)
  - Kamen Rider X (1974, Japan)
  - Kamen Rider Amazon (1974–1975, Japan)
  - Kamen Rider Stronger (1975, Japan)
  - Kamen Rider (Skyrider) (1979–1980, Japan)
  - Kamen Rider Super-1 (1980–1981, Japan)
  - Birth of the 10th! Kamen Riders All Together!! (1984, Japan)
  - Kamen Rider Black (1987–1988, Japan)
  - Kamen Rider Black RX (1988–1989, Japan)
  - Kamen Rider Kuuga (2000–2001, Japan)
  - Kamen Rider Agito (2001–2002, Japan)
  - Kamen Rider Ryuki (2002–2003, Japan)
  - Kamen Rider 555 (2003–2004, Japan)
  - Kamen Rider Blade (2004–2005, Japan)
  - Kamen Rider Hibiki (2005–2006, Japan)
  - Kamen Rider Kabuto (2006–2007, Japan)
  - Kamen Rider Den-O (2007–2008, Japan)
  - Kamen Rider Kiva (2008–2009, Japan)
  - Kamen Rider Decade (2009, Japan)
  - Kamen Rider G (2009, Japan, special)
  - Masked Rider (1995–1996, Kamen Rider Black RX US adaptation)
  - Kamen Rider: Dragon Knight (2009, US, adaptation)
  - Kamen Rider W a.k.a. Kamen Rider Double (2009–2010, Japan)
  - Kamen Rider OOO (2010–2011, Japan)
- Monsters vs. Aliens (franchise):
  - B.O.B.'s Big Break (2009, Monsters vs. Aliens spin-off, short film, animated)
  - Monsters vs. Aliens: Mutant Pumpkins from Outer Space (2009, Monsters vs. Aliens spin-off, special, animated)
  - Night of the Living Carrots (2011, Monsters vs. Aliens spin-off, Monsters vs. Aliens: Mutant Pumpkins from Outer Space sequel, special, animated)
  - Monsters vs. Aliens a.k.a. MvA (2013–2014, Monsters vs. Aliens spin-off, animated)
- Parasyte (2014, Japan, animated)
- Pet Alien a.k.a. Alién Bazaar (2005, US/France, animated)
- Planet Lulin (2024, Australia)
- Project UFO (1978–1979)
- Sgt. Frog (2004–2011, Japan, animated)
- Terrahawks (1983–1986, UK, puppetry)
- Threshold (2005–2006)
- Tripods, The (1984–1985, UK/Australia)
- UFO (1970–1971, UK)
- V (franchise):
  - V: The Original Miniseries (1983, miniseries)
  - V: The Final Battle a.k.a. V:TFB (1984, miniseries)
  - V: The Series (1984–1985)
  - V (2009–2011)
- War of the Worlds (franchise):
  - War of the Worlds (1988–1990)
  - War of the Worlds, The (2019, UK)
  - War of the Worlds (2019–2022, US/UK/France)
- Whispers, The (2015)
- Widget (1990–1991, animated)
- X-Files, The (1993–2002, 2016–2018)

=== Alternate history ===
- Alternate History: Television
- List of alternate history fiction: TV Shows
- Code Geass (franchise):
  - Code Geass: Lelouch of the Rebellion a.k.a. Code Geass (2006–2007, Japan, animated)
  - Code Geass: Lelouch of the Rebellion R2 (2008, Japan, animated)
- Doctor Who (franchise):
  - Doctor Who (1963–1989, 1996, 2005–present, UK)
  - K-9 and Company (1981, UK, Doctor Who spin-off, pilot)
  - A Fix with Sontarans (1985, UK, segment)
  - Dimensions in Time (1993, UK, special, crossover)
  - P.R.O.B.E. (1994–1996, UK, Doctor Who spin-offs, films):
    - Zero Imperative, The (1994, UK, Doctor Who spin-off, film)
    - Devil of Winterborne, The (1995, UK, Doctor Who spin-off, film)
    - Unnatural Selection (1996, UK, Doctor Who spin-off, film)
    - Ghosts of Winterborne (1996, UK, Doctor Who spin-off, film)
  - Doctor Who and the Curse of Fatal Death a.k.a. The Curse of Fatal Death (1999, UK, special)
  - Doctor Who: Children in Need a.k.a. Born Again (2005, UK, special)
  - Attack of the Graske (2005, UK, interactive mini-episode)
  - Torchwood (2006–2011, UK, Doctor Who spin-off):
    - Torchwood: Children of Earth (2009, miniseries, third season)
    - Torchwood: Miracle Day (2011, fourth season)
  - Totally Doctor Who (2006–2007, UK)
  - Sarah Jane Adventures, The (2007–2011, UK, Doctor Who spin-off)
  - Time Crash (2007, UK, mini-episode)
  - Doctor Who: The Infinite Quest (2007, UK, animated)
  - Music of the Spheres (2009, UK, mini-episode)
  - Doctor Who: Tonight's the Night (2009, UK, special)
  - Doctor Who: Dreamland (2009, UK, animated)
  - K-9 (2009–2010, UK/Australia, Doctor Who spin-off)
- For All Mankind (2019–present)
- Harsh Realm (1999–2000, Canada/US)
- Man in the High Castle, The (2015–2019)
- Sliders (1995–2000)
- Star Trek: The Original Series (1966–1969) (in episode The City on the Edge of Forever)
- Tomorrow People, The (1973–1979, UK)
- Twilight Zone, The (anthology) (franchise):
  - Twilight Zone, The (1959–1964, anthology)
  - Twilight Zone, The (1985–1989, anthology)
  - Twilight Zone, The (2002, anthology)
- Unnatural History (2010, US/Canada, anthology) (elements of science fiction in some episodes)

=== Anthology ===
- Anthology series: Television
- Alfred Hitchcock Presents (1955–1965, anthology)
- Amazing Stories (1985–1987, anthology)
- Babylon 5: The Lost Tales (2007, anthology)
- Black Mirror (2011–present, UK, anthology)
- Collector, The a.k.a. Sakupljac (2005–2006, Serbia, anthology)
- Dark Realm (2001, anthology)
- Darkroom (1981–1982, anthology)
- Dead Man's Gun (1997–1999, anthology) (elements of science fiction in some episodes)
- Dimension 404 (2017, anthology)
- Disneyland a.k.a. Wonderful World of Disney, The (1954–2008, anthology) (elements of science fiction in some episodes)
- Friday the 13th: The Series (1987–1990, Canada)
- Hora Marcada, La a.k.a. Marked Time, The (1986, Mexico, anthology)
- Infinite Worlds of H. G. Wells, The a.k.a. The Scientist (2001, UK/US, miniseries, anthology)
- Love, Death & Robots (2019–present, anthology, animated)
- Masters of Science Fiction (2007, anthology)
- Métal Hurlant Chronicles (2012–2014, France/Belgium, anthology)
- Monsters (1988-1991, anthology)
- Night Gallery (1970–1973, anthology)
- Night Visions (2001, anthology)
- Outer Limits, The (anthology) (franchise):
  - Outer Limits, The (1963–1965, anthology)
  - Outer Limits, The (1995–2002, anthology)
- Out of the Unknown (1965–1971, UK, anthology)
- Perversions of Science (1997)
- Philip K. Dick's Electric Dreams (2017, US/UK, anthology)
- Ray Bradbury Theatre (1985–1992, anthology)
- Science Fiction Theatre (1955–1957, anthology)
- Space Stars (1981–1982, anthology, animated) (franchise):
  - Herculoids, The (1967–1969, 1981–1982, animated)
  - Astro and the Space Mutts (1981–1982, Jetsons, The spin-off, animated)
  - Space Ghost (1966–1968, animated)
  - Space Ghost Coast to Coast a.k.a. SGC2C (1994–2001, Space Ghost parody, animated)
  - Teen Force (1981–1982, animated)
  - Cartoon Planet (1995–2000, 2012–2014, Space Ghost Coast to Coast spin-off, animated)
- Spicy City (1997, anthology, animated)
- Tales from the Cryptkeeper (1993–1997, anthology, animated)
- Tales from the Darkside (1983–1988, anthology)
- Tales of the Unexpected (1979–1988, UK, anthology)
- Tales of Tomorrow (1951–1953, anthology)
- Third Eye, The (1981–1983, anthology)
- Twilight Zone, The (anthology) (franchise):
  - Twilight Zone, The (1959–1964, anthology)
  - Twilight Zone, The (1985–1989, anthology)
  - Twilight Zone, The (2002, anthology)
  - Twilight Zone, The (2019–2020, anthology)
- Unforeseen, The (1960, UK, anthology) IMDb
- Unnatural History (2010, US/Canada, anthology) (elements of science fiction in some episodes)
- Westinghouse Studio One (1948–1958, anthology) (elements of science fiction in this episode)

=== Apocalyptic, post-apocalyptic and World War III ===
- List of apocalyptic, post-apocalyptic and World War III science fiction television programs
- List of nuclear holocaust science fiction television programs

=== Children and young-adult ===
  - List of BBC children's television programmes
  - List of local children's television series (United States)
- Twenty Thousand Leagues Under the Seas (franchise):
  - Undersea Adventures of Captain Nemo, The (1975, Canada, animated)
  - 20,000 Leagues Under the Sea (1985, Australia, film, animated)
  - 20,000 Leagues Under the Sea (2002, film, animated) IMDb
- 2030 CE (2002, Canada)
- Aaron Stone (2009–2010, US/Canada)
- Action Man (franchise):
  - Action Man (1995, UK, animated)
  - Action Man (2000, UK, animated)
  - A.T.O.M. (Alpha Teens On Machines) (2005–2006, Action Man spin-off, France, animated)
- Adventures of Jimmy Neutron: Boy Genius, The a.k.a. Jimmy Neutron (franchise):
  - Adventures of Jimmy Neutron: Boy Genius, The (2002–2006, animated)
  - The Egg-pire Strikes Back (2003, special, animated)
  - Operation: Jet Fusion (2003, film, animated)
  - Jimmy Timmy Power Hour, The (2004, film, animated)
  - Attack of the Twonkies (2004, film, animated)
  - League of Villains, The (2005, film, animated)
  - Jimmy Timmy Power Hour 2: When Nerds Collide, The (2006, film, animated)
  - Jimmy Timmy Power Hour 3: The Jerkinators, The (2007, film, animated)
  - Planet Sheen (2010–2012, Adventures of Jimmy Neutron: Boy Genius, The spin-off, animated)
- Adventures of the Galaxy Rangers, The (1986–1989, animated)
- ALF (franchise):
  - ALF: The Animated Series (1987–1989, ALF spin-off, animated)
  - Project ALF (1996, ALF sequel, film)
  - ALF (1986–1990)
- Alien Racers (2005, animated)
- Alienators: Evolution Continues (2001–2002, US, animated) a.k.a. Evolution: the Animated Series (UK)
- Aliens in the Family (1987, UK) IMDb
- Alpha Scorpio (1974, Australia)
- Amazing 3, The (1965–1966, Japan, animated)
- Andra (1976, Australia) IMDb
- Android Announcer Maico 2010 (1998, Japan, animated)
- Angel Links (1999, Japan, animated)
- Ani*Kuri15 (2007–2008, Japan, animated short) (elements of science fiction in some episodes)
- Animorphs (1998–1999)
- Aquaman (1968–1970, animated)
- Aquatic Language (2002, Japan, short film, animated)
- Aquila (1997–1998, UK)
- Archie's Weird Mysteries (1999–2000, animated)
- Argai: The Prophecy a.k.a. Argaï: La prophétie (2000, France, animated)
- Armored Police Metal Jack (1981, Japan, animated)
- Astro Boy (franchise):
  - Astro Boy (1963–1966, Japan, animated)
  - Astro Boy (1980–1981, Japan, animated)
  - Astro Boy (2003–2004, Japan, animated)
- Attack of the Killer Tomatoes: The Animated Series (1990–1992, animated)
- Atomic Betty (2004–2008, Canada/France, animated)
- Aura Battler Dunbine (1983–1984, Japan, animated)
- Avengers, The (franchise):
  - Avengers Assemble (2013–2019, animated)
  - Avengers: Earth's Mightiest Heroes, The (2010–2012, animated)
  - Avengers: United They Stand, The (1999–2000, animated)
- Back to the Future: The Animated Series (1991–1992, animated)
- Batman (franchise):
  - Batman (1966–1968)
  - Batman/Superman Hour, The (1968–1969, animated)
  - Adventures of Batman and Robin the Boy Wonder, The (1969–1970, animated)
  - New Adventures of Batman, The (1977–1981, animated)
  - Batman: The Animated Series (1992–1995, animated)
  - New Batman Adventures, The a.k.a. TNBA (1997–1999, Batman: The Animated Series sequel, animated)
  - Batman Beyond (1999–2001, animated)
  - Batman, The (2004–2008, animated)
  - Batman: The Brave and the Bold (2008–2011, animated)
  - Beware the Batman (2013–2014, animated)
- BattleTech: The Animated Series (1994, animated)
- Battletoads (1992, Canada/US, special, pilot, animated)
- Ben 10 (franchise):
  - Ben 10 (2005–2008, animated)
  - Ben 10: Secret of the Omnitrix (2007, animated, film)
  - Ben 10: Race Against Time (2007, film)
  - Ben 10: Alien Force (2008–2010, animated)
  - Ben 10: Alien Swarm (2009, film)
  - Ben 10: Ultimate Alien (2010–2012, animated)
  - Ben 10: Destroy All Aliens a.k.a. Ben 10: Alien Dimensions (2012, film, animated)
  - Ben 10: Omniverse (2012–2014, animated)
  - Ben 10 (2016–2021, animated)
- Big Bad Beetleborgs a.k.a. Beetleborgs Metallix (1996–1998)
- Big Guy and Rusty the Boy Robot, The (1999–2001, animated)
- Big O, The (1999–2000, 2003, Japan, animated)
- Biker Mice from Mars (franchise):
  - Biker Mice from Mars (1993–1996, animated)
  - Biker Mice from Mars (2006 TV series) (2006–2007, animated)
- Bill & Ted's Excellent Adventures (1990–1991, animated)
- Bionic Six (1987–1989, animated)
- Birdman and the Galaxy Trio (1967–1969, animated)
- Black Panther (2010, animated)
- Blue Comet SPT Layzner (1985–1986, Japan, animated) a.k.a. Blue Meteor SPT Layzner (US)
- Bodacious Space Pirates (2012, Japan, animated)
- Boy from Andromeda, The (1991, New Zealand, miniseries) IMDb
- Brats of the Lost Nebula (1998–1999, animated, puppetry)
- BraveStarr (1987–1988, animated)
- Bucky O'Hare and the Toad Wars (1991, UK/US, animated)
- Bureau of Alien Detectors (1996, animated)
- C.O.P.S. (1988, animated)
- Cadillacs and Dinosaurs (1993–1994, animated)
- Captain Future a.k.a. Capitaine Flam (France), a.k.a. Capitan Futuro (Italy), a.k.a. Capitán Futuro (Spain/Latin America), a.k.a. Knight of Space, The (Arabic) (1978–1979, Japan, animated)
- Captain Harlock (manga) (franchise):
  - Space Pirate Captain Harlock (1978–1979, Japan, animated)
  - Galaxy Express 999 (1978–1981, Japan, animated)
  - Space Symphony Maetel (2004–2005, Japan, Galaxy Express 999 sequel, animated)
  - Space Pirate Captain Herlock: The Endless Odyssey (2002, Japan, animated)
  - Harlock Saga (1998–1999, Japan, animated)
  - Arcadia of My Youth: Endless Orbit SSX (1982–1983, Japan, animated)
  - Queen Emeraldas (1998–1999, Japan, animated)
  - Captain Harlock and the Queen of a Thousand Years (1985–1986, US/Japan, animated)
  - Queen Millennia (1981–1982, Japan, animated)
- Captain Power and the Soldiers of the Future (1987–1988, Canada/US, partly animated)
- Captain Simian & the Space Monkeys (1996–1997, animated)
- Captain Scarlet (franchise):
  - Captain Scarlet and the Mysterons (1967–1968, UK, puppetry)
  - Captain Scarlet vs the Mysterons (1980, Captain Scarlet and the Mysterons compilation, puppetry, film)
  - Revenge of the Mysterons from Mars (1981, Captain Scarlet and the Mysterons compilation, puppetry, film)
  - New Captain Scarlet (2005, UK, animated)
- Captain Z-Ro (1951–1956)
- Captain Zep – Space Detective (1983–1984, UK)
- Cars Toons: Mater's Tall Tales (2008–2012, animated) (elements of science fiction in the Unidentified Flying Mater episode)
- Casshern (franchise):
  - Casshern Sins (2008–2009, Japan, animated, Neo-Human Casshern reboot)
  - Neo-Human Casshern (1973–1974, Japan, animated)
- Centurions, The (1985–1987, animated)
- Century Falls (1993, UK)
- Children of the Dog Star (1984, New Zealand, miniseries)
- Children of the Stones (1977, UK, elements of science fiction)
- Chocky (1984–1985, UK)
- Clangers (1969–1974, UK)
- Cleopatra in Space (2019–2021, animated)
- Cobra (franchise):
  - Space Cobra (1982–1983, Japan, animated)
  - Cobra the Animation: Rokunin no Yushi (2010, Japan, animated)
- Code Geass (franchise):
  - Code Geass: Lelouch of the Rebellion a.k.a. Code Geass (2006–2007, Japan, animated)
  - Code Geass: Lelouch of the Rebellion R2 (2008, Japan, animated)
- Code Lyoko (franchise):
  - Garage Kids (2001, France/US, Code Lyoko pilot, animated)
  - Code Lyoko (2003–2007, France, animated)
  - Code Lyoko: Evolution (2012–2013, France, partly animated)
- Combat Mecha Xabungle (1982–1983, Japan, animated)
- Cosmic Quantum Ray (2009, Germany, animated)
- Cosmo Warrior Zero (2001, Japan, animated)
- Crash – Truslen fra det sorte hul a.k.a. Crash – The Menace from the Black Hole (1984, Denmark)
- Crest of the Stars Trilogy (franchise):
  - Crest of the Stars (1999, Japan, animated)
  - Banner of the Stars (2001, Japan, animated)
  - Banner of the Stars II (2001, Japan, animated)
- Cubix (2001–2003, South Korea, animated) a.k.a. Cubix: Robots for Everyone (US)
- Cybergirl (2001–2002, Australia)
- Cybersix (franchise):
  - Cybersix (1995, Argentina)
  - Cybersix (1999, Canada/Argentina, animated)
- Cyborg 009 (franchise):
  - Cyborg 009 (1968, Japan, animated)
  - Cyborg 009 (1979–1980, Japan, animated)
  - Cyborg 009 (2001–2002, Japan, animated)
- D.Gray-man (2006–2008, Japan, animated)
- Dan Dare: Pilot of the Future (2001, UK, animated)
- Danball Senki (franchise):
  - Danball Senki a.k.a. Cardboard Chronicles (2011–2012, Japan, animated)
  - Danball Senki W (Dabaru) a.k.a. Cardboard Chronicles W (Double) (2012–2013, Japan, animated)
  - Danball Senki Wars (2013, Japan, animated)
- Dark Season (1991, UK)
- Darkstalkers (1995, animated) Epguides IMDb (elements of science fiction)
- Darkwing Duck (1991–1992, animated) (elements of science fiction in some episodes)
- DC Nation Shorts (2012, shorts, animated)
- Defenders of the Earth (1986–1987, animated)
- Delilah and Julius (2005–2008, Canada, animated, elements of science fiction)
- Dex Hamilton: Alien Entomologist (2007, Canada/Australia/UK, animated)
- Dexter's Laboratory (franchise):
  - Dexter's Laboratory a.k.a. Dexter's Lab (1996–2003, animated)
  - Dial M for Monkey (1996–1999, Dexter's Laboratory backup segment, animated)
  - Justice Friends, The (1996–1998, Dexter's Laboratory backup segment, animated)
- Di-Gata Defenders (2006–2008, Canada, animated) (elements of science fiction)
- Dick Spanner, P.I. (1986–1987, UK, stop-motion animation)
- Dino-Riders (1988, animated)
- Dinosapien (2007, UK/Canada)
- Dinosaucers (1987, animated)
- Dinosaur King (franchise):
  - Dinosaur King a.k.a. Ancient Ruler Dinosaur King DKidz Adventure (2007–2008, Japan, animated)
  - Ancient Ruler Dinosaur King DKidz Adventure: Pterosaur Legend (2008, Japan, animated)
- Dinosaur War Izenborg (1977–1978, Japan, animated)
- Dino Squad (2007–2008, animated)
- Disney's Fluppy Dogs (1986, special, animated)
- Disneyland a.k.a. Wonderful World of Disney, The (1954–2008, anthology) (elements of science fiction in some episodes)
- Dirty Pair (1985, Japan, animated)
- Doctor Who (franchise):
  - Doctor Who: Children in Need a.k.a. Born Again (2005, UK, special)
  - Totally Doctor Who (2006–2007, UK)
  - Sarah Jane Adventures, The (2007–2011, UK, Doctor Who spin-off)
  - Doctor Who: The Infinite Quest (2007, UK, animated)
  - Music of the Spheres (2008, UK, mini-episode)
  - Doctor Who: Tonight's the Night (2009, UK, special)
  - Doctor Who: Dreamland (2009, UK, animated)
  - K-9 (2009–2010, UK/Australia, Doctor Who spin-off)
- Doom Runners (1997, Australia, film)
- Doraemon (franchise):
  - Doraemon (1973, Japan, animated)
  - Doraemon (1979–2005, Japan, animated)
  - Doraemon (2005–present, Japan, animated)
- Dork Hunters from Outer Space (2008–2009, UK/Germany, animated) IMDb
- Dr. Slump (franchise):
  - Dr. Slump – Arale-chan (1981–1986, Japan, animated)
  - Doctor Slump (1997–1999, Japan, animated)
- Dragon Ball (franchise):
  - Dragon Ball (1986–1989, Japan, animated)
  - Dragon Ball Z a.k.a. DBZ (1989–1996, Japan, animated)
  - Dragon Ball Z: Bardock – The Father of Goku (1990, Japan, special, animated)
  - Dragon Ball Z: The History of Trunks (1993, Japan, special, animated)
  - Dragon Ball GT a.k.a. Dragon Ball G(rand) T(our) (1996–1997, Japan, animated)
  - Dragon Ball GT: A Hero's Legacy (1997, Japan, special, animated)
  - Dragon Ball Z Kai (2009–2015, Japan, animated)
- Dragon Booster (2004–2006, Canada, animated)
- Dragon Drive (2002–2003, Japan, animated)
- Dragon Flyz (1996–1997, France, animated)
- Duck Dodgers (franchise):
  - Duck Dodgers in the 24½th Century (1953, animated)
  - Duck Dodgers and the Return of the 24½th Century (1980, animated)
  - Duck Dodgers (2003–2006, animated)
- Eerie, Indiana (franchise):
  - Eerie, Indiana (1991–1992)
  - Eerie, Indiana: The Other Dimension (1998)
- Emerald Soup (1963, UK)
- Eon Kid a.k.a. Iron Kid (2006–2008, South Korea/Spain, animated)
- Escape from Jupiter (1994, Australia)
- Evil Con Carne (2003–2004, animated)
- Exosquad (1993–1994, animated)
- Extreme Dinosaurs (1997, animated)
- Fairly OddParents, The (franchise) (elements of science fiction):
  - Jimmy Timmy Power Hour, The (2004, film, animated)
  - Jimmy Timmy Power Hour 2: When Nerds Collide, The (2006, film, animated)
  - Jimmy Timmy Power Hour 3: The Jerkinators, The (2007, film, animated)
  - Fairly OddParents, The (2001–2017, animated)
  - Fairly OddParents: Abra-Catastrophe!, The (2003, film, animated)
  - Channel Chasers (2004, film, animated)
  - School's Out! The Musical (2005, film, animated)
  - Fairy Idol (2006, film, animated)
  - Fairly OddBaby (2008, film, animated)
  - Fairly OddParents: Wishology, The (2009, film, animated)
  - A Fairly Odd Movie: Grow Up, Timmy Turner! (2011, film)
- Family's Defensive Alliance, The (2001, Japan, animated)
- Fang of the Sun Dougram (1981–1983, Japan, animated)
- Fantastic Four (franchise):
  - Fantastic Four (1967–1970, animated)
  - Fantastic Four (1978, animated)
  - Fantastic Four (1994–1996, animated)
  - Fantastic Four: World's Greatest Heroes (2006–2007, animated)
- Fantastic Max (1988–1990, animated)
- Fantastic Voyage (1968–1969, animated)
- Far Out Space Nuts (1975–1976)
- Final Fantasy (franchise):
  - Final Fantasy: Unlimited (2001–2002, Japan, animated) (elements of science fiction in some episodes)
- Fireball (franchise):
  - Fireball (2009, Japan/US, animated)
  - Fireball Charming (2011, Japan/US, animated)
- Fireball XL5 (1962–1963, puppetry)
- Firebreather (2010, film, animated)
- Firestorm (2002–2003, Japan/UK, animated)
- Flash Gordon (franchise):
  - New Adventures of Flash Gordon, The a.k.a. Adventures of Flash Gordon, The a.k.a. Flash Gordon (1979–1980, animated)
  - Flash Gordon: The Greatest Adventure of All (1982, animated)
  - Flash Gordon a.k.a. The Adventures of Flash Gordon, The (1996–1997, US/France/Canada, animated)
- Freedom Force, The (1978, animated, Tarzan and the Super 7 segment)
- Freaky (2003, New Zealand)
- Full Metal Panic! a.k.a. FMP! (franchise):
  - Full Metal Panic? Fumoffu (2003, Japan, animated)
  - Full Metal Panic!: The Second Raid (2006, Japan, animated)
- Fullmetal Alchemist (franchise):
  - Fullmetal Alchemist a.k.a. Hagane no Renkinjutsushi (2003–2004, Japan, animated)
  - Fullmetal Alchemist: Brotherhood a.k.a. Hagane no Renkinjutsushi: Furumetaru Arukemisuto (2009–2010, Japan, animated)
- Future Boy Conan (1978, Japan, animated)
- Future is Wild, The (2007–2008, US, docufiction, animated)
- G.I. Joe (franchise):
  - G.I. Joe: A Real American Hero (1985–1987, animated)
  - G.I. Joe: A Real American Hero (1989–1991, animated)
  - G.I. Joe Extreme (1995–1997, animated)
  - G.I. Joe: Sigma 6 (2005–2007, animated)
  - G.I. Joe: Resolute (2009, animated)
  - G.I. Joe: Renegades (2010–2011, animated)
- Galactik Football (2006–2011, France, animated)
- Galaxy Angel (franchise):
  - Galaxy Angel (2001–2002, Japan, animated)
  - Galaxy Angel Z (2002, Japan, animated)
  - Galaxy Angel A (2002, Japan, animated)
  - Galaxy Angel AA (2003, Japan, animated)
  - Galaxy Angel S (2003, Japan, special, animated)
  - Galaxy Angel X (2004, Japan, animated)
  - Galaxy Angel Rune (2006, Japan, animated)
- Galaxy High (1986, animated)
- Galidor: Defenders of the Outer Dimension (2002)
- Gargantia on the Verdurous Planet a.k.a. Suisei no Gargantia (2013, Japan, animated)
- Gasaraki (1998–1999, Japan, animated)
- Gatchaman (franchise):
  - Science Ninja Team Gatchaman a.k.a. Gatchaman (1972–1974, Japan, animated)
  - Gatchaman II a.k.a. Science Ninja Team Gatchaman II (1978–1979, Japan, animated)
  - Battle of the Planets (1978–1985, Science Ninja Team Gatchaman adaptation, US/Japan, animated)
  - Gatchaman Fighter a.k.a. Science Ninja Team Gatchaman Fighter (1979–1980, Japan, animated)
  - G-Force: Guardians of Space (1986, Science Ninja Team Gatchaman adaptation, US/Japan, animated)
  - Eagle Riders (1996–1997, Gatchaman II and Gatchaman Fighter adaptation, US/Australia/Japan, animated)
- Gate Keepers (2000, Japan, animated)
- Generator Rex (2010–2013, animated)
- Genesis Climber MOSPEADA (1983–1984, Japan, animated)
- Getter Robo (franchise):
  - Getter Robo (1974–1975, Japan, animated)
  - Getter Robo G (1975–1976, Japan, animated)
  - Getter Robo Go (1991–1992, Japan, animated)
- Giant Robo (franchise):
  - Giant Robo (1967–1968, Japan) a.k.a. Johnny Sokko and his Flying Robot (US)
  - GR: Giant Robo (2007, Japan, animated)
- Gilligan's Planet (1982–1983, animated)
- Gintama (franchise):
  - Gintama (2006–2010, Japan, animated)
  - Yorinuki Gintama-san (2010–2011, Japan, animated)
  - Gintama' (2011–2013, Japan, animated)
- Girl from Tomorrow, The (franchise):
  - Girl from Tomorrow, The (1992, Australia)
  - Girl from Tomorrow Part II: Tomorrow's End, The (1993, Australia)
- GoBots (franchise):
  - GoBots (1984, miniseries, animated)
  - Challenge of the GoBots a.k.a. Mighty Machine Men (1985, animated)
- Godzilla (franchise):
  - Godzilla (1978–1981, Japan/US, animated)
  - Godzilla: The Series (1998–2000, US/Japan, animated)
- Great Space Coaster, The (1981–1986, puppetry)
- Green Lantern: The Animated Series (2011–2013, animated)
- Guardians of the Galaxy (2015–2019, animated)
- Gulliver's Travels (franchise):
  - Adventures of Gulliver, The (1968–1970, animated)
  - Gulliver's Travels (1992, Canada/US, animated) IMDb
- Gundam (franchise):
  - Mobile Suit Gundam (1979–1980, Japan, animated)
  - Mobile Suit Zeta Gundam (1985–1986, Japan, animated)
  - Mobile Suit Gundam ZZ (1986–1987, Japan, animated)
  - Mobile Suit Victory Gundam (1993–1994, Japan, animated)
  - Mobile Fighter G Gundam (1994–1995, Japan, animated)
  - Mobile Suit Gundam Wing (1995–1996, Japan, animated)
  - After War Gundam X a.k.a. Mobile New Century Gundam X (1996, Japan, animated)
  - Turn A Gundam a.k.a. ∀ Gundam (1999, Japan, animated)
  - G-Saviour (2000, US/Japan, film)
  - Mobile Suit Gundam SEED (2002–2003, Japan, animated)
  - Superior Defender Gundam Force (2004, Japan, animated)
  - Mobile Suit Gundam SEED Destiny (2004–2005, Japan, animated)
  - Mobile Suit Gundam 00 (2007–2009, Japan, animated)
  - SD Gundam Sangokuden Brave Battle Warriors (2010–2011, Japan, animated)
  - Mobile Suit Gundam AGE (2011–2012, Japan, animated)
- .hack (franchise):
  - .hack//Sign (2002, Japan, animated)
  - .hack//Legend of the Twilight (2003, Japan, animated)
  - .hack//Roots (2006, Japan, animated)
- Hand Maid May (2000, Japan, animated)
- HaShminiya a.k.a. The Octette (2005–2007, 2013–2014, Israel)
- He-Man and the Masters of the Universe (franchise):
  - He-Man and the Masters of the Universe (1983–1985, animated)
  - She-Ra: Princess of Power (1985–1987, animated)
  - New Adventures of He-Man, The (1990, animated)
  - He-Man and the Masters of the Universe (2002–2004, animated)
- Heavy Gear: The Animated Series (2001, Canada, animated)
- Hero: 108 (2010–2012, US/Canada/Taiwan/UK, animated)
- Hero Factory (2010–2014, miniseries, animated)
- Hero High (1981–1982, animated)
- Heroman (2010, Japan, animated)
- Hilarious House of Frightenstein, The (1971, Canada)
- Honey, I Shrunk the Kids (1997–2000)
- Hot Wheels (franchise):
  - Hot Wheels AcceleRacers (2005, animated)
  - Hot Wheels Battle Force 5 a.k.a. Battle Force 5 (UK/Ireland) (2009–2011, animated)
- Huntik: Secrets & Seekers (2009–2012, animated)
- Hypernauts (1996)
- Incredible Hulk, The (franchise):
  - Incredible Hulk, The (1982–1983, animated)
  - Incredible Hulk, The a.k.a. Incredible Hulk and She-Hulk, The (1996–1997, animated)
  - Hulk and the Agents of S.M.A.S.H. (2013–2015, animated)
- Infinite Ryvius (1999–2000, Japan, animated)
- Inhumanoids (1986, animated)
- Interster (1983, South Africa, puppetry)
- Inspector Gadget (franchise):
  - Inspector Gadget (1983–1986, Canada/France/Japan/US, animated)
  - Inspector Gadget Saves Christmas (1992, animated)
  - Gadget Boy & Heather (1995, France, animated)
  - Inspector Gadget's Field Trip (1996–1998, animated)
  - Gadget and the Gadgetinis (2001–2003, Canada, animated)
  - Inspector Gadget (2015–2018, Canada/US, animated)
- Invader Zim (2001–2002, 2004, animated)
- Invasion America (1998, miniseries, animated)
- Invincible Steel Man Daitarn 3 a.k.a. Unchallengeable Daitarn 3, The (1978–1979, Japan, animated)
- Invincible Super Man Zambot 3 a.k.a. Super Machine Zambot 3 (1977–1978, Japan, animated)
- Invisible Man, The (2005, France, animated)
- Iron King (1972–1973, Japan)
- Iron Man (franchise):
  - Iron Man (1994–1996, animated)
  - Iron Man: Armored Adventures (2009–2012, animated)
  - Marvel Anime: Iron Man (2010, Japan, animated)
- Irresponsible Captain Tylor, The (1993–1996, Japan, animated)
- Jason of Star Command (1978–1979, Tarzan and the Super 7 segment)
- Jayce and the Wheeled Warriors (1985, France/Canada/Japan, animated)
- Jimmy Two-Shoes (2009–2011, Canada/UK/US, animated)
- Jing: King of Bandits (2002, Japan, animated)
- Joe 90 (1968–1969, UK, puppetry)
- Johnny Test (2005–2014, animated)
- Jonny Quest (franchise):
  - Real Adventures of Jonny Quest, The (1996–1999, animated)
  - Jonny Quest vs. The Cyber Insects (1995, animated, film, New Adventures of Jonny Quest, The sequel)
  - Jonny's Golden Quest (1993, animated, film, New Adventures of Jonny Quest, The sequel)
  - New Adventures of Jonny Quest, The (1986–1987, animated, Jonny Quest sequel)
  - Jonny Quest (1964–1965, animated)
- Josie and the Pussycats in Outer Space (1972, animated)
- Journey of Allen Strange, The (1997–2000)
- Journey to the Center of the Earth (franchise):
  - Journey to the Center of the Earth (1967, animated)
  - A Journey to the Center of the Earth (1977, Australia, animated) IMDb
  - Journey to the Center of the Earth (1996, Canada, animated) IMDb
  - Journey to the Center of the Earth (2001, France, animated) IMDb
- Jushin Liger (1989–1990, Japan, animated)
- Justice League (franchise):
  - Justice League of America (1997, pilot, film)
  - Justice League (2001–2004, animated)
  - Justice League Unlimited (2004–2006, animated)
  - Young Justice (2010–2013, animated)
  - Justice League Action (2016–2018, animated)
- Kaijudo: Rise of the Duel Masters (2012–2013, animated) (elements of science fiction)
- Kamen Rider (franchise):
  - Kamen Rider (1971–1973, Japan)
  - Kamen Rider X (1974, Japan)
  - Kamen Rider Amazon (1974–1975, Japan)
  - Kamen Rider Stronger (1975, Japan)
  - Kamen Rider (Skyrider) (1979–1980, Japan)
  - Kamen Rider Super-1 (1980–1981, Japan)
  - Birth of the 10th! Kamen Riders All Together!! (1984, Japan)
  - Kamen Rider Black (1987–1988, Japan)
  - Kamen Rider Black RX (1988–1989, Japan)
  - Kamen Rider Kuuga (2000–2001, Japan)
  - Kamen Rider Agito (2001–2002, Japan)
  - Kamen Rider Ryuki (2002–2003, Japan)
  - Kamen Rider 555 (2003–2004, Japan)
  - Kamen Rider Blade (2004–2005, Japan)
  - Kamen Rider Hibiki (2005–2006, Japan)
  - Kamen Rider Kabuto (2006–2007, Japan)
  - Kamen Rider Den-O (2007–2008, Japan)
  - Kamen Rider Kiva (2008–2009, Japan)
  - Kamen Rider Decade (2009, Japan)
  - Kamen Rider G (2009, Japan, special)
  - Masked Rider (1995–1996, Kamen Rider Black RX US adaptation)
  - Kamen Rider: Dragon Knight (2009, US, adaptation)
  - Kamen Rider W a.k.a. Kamen Rider Double (2009–2010, Japan)
  - Kamen Rider OOO (2010–2011, Japan)
- Kappatoo (1990, UK)
- Kids from OWL, The (1985, New Zealand)
- King of Braves GaoGaiGar, The (franchise):
  - King of Braves GaoGaiGar, The (1997–1998, Japan, animated)
  - King of Braves GaoGaiGar Final -Grand Glorious Gathering-, The (2005, Japan, animated)
- Kitu and Woofl (1997, Australia, animated)
- Kino's Journey (2003, Japan, animated)
- Knights of God (1987, UK)
- Kong: The Animated Series (2000–2001, animated) (elements of science fiction)
- Krofft Supershow, The (1976–1978) (franchise):
  - Dr. Shrinker (1976–1977)
  - Electra Woman and Dyna Girl (1976–1977)
- Lab Rats (2008, UK) (elements of science fiction)
- Lampies, The (2001–2002, UK, animated)
- Land of the Lost (franchise):
  - Land of the Lost (1974–1976)
  - Land of the Lost (1991–1992, Land of the Lost remake)
- Lavender Castle (1999–2000, UK, stop-motion animation)
- Lazer Tag Academy (1986, animated)
- League of Super Evil a.k.a. L.O.S.E. (2009–2012, Canada, animated)
- Legacy of the Silver Shadow (2002, Australia) Legacy of the Silver Shadow IMDb
- Legends of the Superheroes (1979)
- Legion of Super Heroes (2006–2008, animated)
- Lilo & Stitch (franchise):
  - Lilo & Stitch: The Series (2003–2006, animated)
  - Stitch! (2008–2011, Japan, animated)
- Lloyd in Space (2001–2004, animated)
- Loonatics Unleashed (2004–2007, animated)
- Lost Saucer, The (1975–1976)
- Luna (1983–1984, UK)
- M.A.S.K. (1985–1986, animated)
- Macross (franchise):
  - Super Dimension Fortress Macross, The (1982–1983, Japan, animated)
  - Super Dimension Cavalry Southern Cross (1984, Japan, animated)
  - Super Dimension Century Orguss (1983–1984, Japan, animated)
  - Macross 7 (1994–1995, Japan, animated)
  - Macross Frontier (2008, Japan, animated)
  - Macross Delta (2016, Japan, animated)
- Magician, The a.k.a. Magicien, Le (1997–1998, France, animated)
- Mandog (1972, UK) IMDb
- Manta and Moray (1979, animated, Tarzan and the Super 7 segment)
- Marine Boy a.k.a. Undersea Boy Marine (franchise):
  - Dolphin Prince (1966, Japan, animated)
  - Hang On! Marine Kid (1969, Japan, animated)
  - Undersea Boy Marine (1969–1971, Japan, animated)
- Mario (franchise):
  - Saturday Supercade: Space Ace (1984, segment, animated)
  - Super Mario Bros. Super Show!, The (1989, animated)
  - Captain N: The Game Master (1989–1991, animated)
  - Adventures of Super Mario Bros. 3, The (1990, animated)
  - Super Mario World (1991, animated)
- Martin Mystery (2003–2006, Italy/France/Canada, animated) (elements of science fiction)
- Marvin Marvin (2012–2013)
- Max Steel (franchise):
  - Max Steel (2013–2016, animated)
  - Max Steel (2000–2002, animated)
- Mazinger (franchise):
  - Mazinger Z (1972–1974, Japan, animated) a.k.a. Tranzor Z (US)
  - Great Mazinger (1974–1975, Japan, animated)
  - Grendizer (1975–1977, Japan, animated)
  - God Mazinger (1984, Japan, animated)
  - Shin Mazinger Shougeki! Z Hen (2009, Japan, animated)
- Mech-X4 (2016–2018)
- Medabots a.k.a. Medarot (1999–2001, Japan, animated)
- Mega Man (US) a.k.a. Rockman (Japan) (franchise):
  - Mega Man a.k.a. Mega Man: A Rockman series (1994–1995, Japan/US, animated)
  - MegaMan NT Warrior a.k.a. Mega Man Battle Network a.k.a. Rockman.EXE (2002–2003, Japan, animated)
  - MegaMan NT Warrior Axess a.k.a. Rockman.EXE Axess (2003–2004, Japan, animated)
  - MegaMan NT Warrior Stream a.k.a. Rockman.EXE Stream (2004–2005, Japan, animated)
  - MegaMan NT Warrior Beast a.k.a. Rockman.EXE Beast (2005–2006, Japan, animated)
  - MegaMan NT Warrior Beast+ a.k.a. Rockman.EXE Beast+ (2006, Japan, animated)
  - Mega Man Star Force a.k.a. Shooting Star Rockman (2006–2007, Japan, animated)
  - Mega Man Star Force Tribe a.k.a. Shooting Star Rockman Tribe (2007–2008, Japan, animated)
- Megas XLR (2004–2005, animated)
- MetaJets (2008–2010, South Korea/Canada, animated)
- Metal Fighter Miku (1994, Japan, animated)
- Metal Mickey (1980–1983, UK)
- Mighty Heroes, The (1966, animated)
- Mighty Max (1993–1994, animated)
- Mighty Mouse (franchise):
  - New Adventures of Mighty Mouse and Heckle & Jeckle, The (1979–1982, animated)
  - Mighty Mouse: The New Adventures (1987–1988, animated)
- Miles from Tomorrowland (2015, animated)
- Mission Terra (1985-1988, Germany)
- Monster Force (1994, animated) (elements of science fiction)
- Motorcity (2012, animated)
- Mr. Squiggle (1959–1999, Australia, puppetry)
- My Favorite Martians (1973–1975, animated)
- My Goldfish Is Evil (2006–2008, Canada, animated)
- My Life as a Teenage Robot (2002–2006, animated)
- Mysterious Cities of Gold, The (1982–1983, animated)
- Nadesico (franchise):
  - Martian Successor Nadesico a.k.a. Mobile Battleship Nadesico a.k.a. Nadesico (1996–1997, Japan, animated)
  - Gekiganger III (1996–1997, Japan, clips within Martian Successor Nadesico, animated)
- Nadia: The Secret of Blue Water (franchise):
  - Nadia: The Secret of Blue Water a.k.a. Fushigi no Umi no Nadia (1990–1991, Japan, animated)
  - Nadia: The Secret of Fuzzy (1992, Japan, animated, film)
- NASCAR Racers (1999–2001, animated)
- Needless (2009, Japan, animated)
- Nanoboy (franchise):
  - New Adventures of Nanoboy, The (2009–2010, Canada, animated) Nanoboy
  - Nanoboy: Hero on the Run (2011, Canada/US, sequel, film, animated)
- New Adventures of Ocean Girl, The (2000–2001, Australia, animated)
- NieA 7 a.k.a. NieA under 7 (2000, Japan, Animated)
- Ninja Senshi Tobikage a.k.a. Ninja Robot Tobikage a.k.a. Ninja Robots (US) (1985–1986, Japan, animated)
- Now and Then, Here and There (1999–2000, Japan, animated)
- Ōban Star-Racers (2006, France/Japan, animated)
- Ocean Girl (1994–1998, Australia) a.k.a. Ocean Odyssey (UK)
- Odyssey, The (1992–1995, Canada)
- Overman King Gainer (2002–2003, Japan, animated)
- Owl, The a.k.a. La Chouette (2003–2006, France, shorts, animated) (elements of science fiction in the Flying Saucer episode)
- Ozzy & Drix a.k.a. The Fantastic Voyage Adventures of Osmosis Jones & Drixenol (2002–2004, animated)
- Packages from Planet X (2013–2014, animated)
- Panzer World Galient (1984–1985, Japan, animated)
- Parallax (2004, Australia)
- Partridge Family 2200 A.D. (1974, animated)
- Patlabor: The TV Series (1989–1990, Japan, animated)
- Pet Alien a.k.a. Alién Bazaar (2005, US/France, animated)
- Phantom 2040 (1994–1996, animated)
- Phil of the Future (2004–2006)
- Planet Lulin (2024, Australia)
- Plasmo (1997, Australia, animated)
- Plastic Man (franchise):
  - Plastic Man (2006, pilot, animated)
  - Plastic Man Comedy/Adventure Show, The (1979–1981, animated)
  - Mighty Man and Yukk (1979–1980, Plastic Man Comedy/Adventure Show, The segment, animated)
  - Rickety Rocket (1979–1980, Plastic Man Comedy/Adventure Show, The segment, animated)
- Power Rangers (franchise):
  - Mighty Morphin Alien Rangers (1996, miniseries)
  - Mighty Morphin Power Rangers (1993–1995)
  - Power Rangers: Zeo (1996)
  - Power Rangers: Turbo (1997)
  - Power Rangers in Space (1998)
  - Power Rangers: Lost Galaxy (1999)
  - Power Rangers: Lightspeed Rescue (2000)
  - Power Rangers: Time Force (2001)
  - Power Rangers: Wild Force (2002)
  - Power Rangers: Ninja Storm (2003)
  - Power Rangers: Dino Thunder (2004)
  - Power Rangers: S.P.D. (2005)
  - Power Rangers: Mystic Force (2006)
  - Power Rangers: Operation Overdrive (2007)
  - Power Rangers: Jungle Fury (2008)
  - Power Rangers: RPM (2009)
  - Power Rangers: Samurai (2011)
- Power Team, The a.k.a. Acclaim Masters (1990–1992, animated)
- Powerpuff Girls, The (1998–2005, animated)
- Prince Planet a.k.a. Planet Boy Popi (1965–1966, Japan/US, animated)
- Problem Solverz, The a.k.a. Neon Knome (2011–2013, animated)
- Project G.e.e.K.e.R. (1996, animated)
- RahXephon (2002, Japan, animated)
- Ray the Animation (2006, Japan, animated)
- Read All About It! (1979–1983, Canada, educational)
- ReBoot (1994–2001, Canada, animated)
- Red Planet (miniseries) (1994, miniseries, animated)
- Redakai: Conquer the Kairu a.k.a. Redakai (2011–2013, animated)
- Redman (1972, Japan)
- Return to Jupiter (1997, Australia)
- Road Rovers (1996–1997, animated)
- Roboroach (2002–2003, Canada, animated)
- Robotboy (2005–2008, UK/France/US, animated)
- Robotech (adaptation) (franchise):
  - Codename: Robotech (1985, US, animated, pilot)
  - Robotech (1985, 3 anime television series adaptation, US/Japan, animated)
  - Robotech II: The Sentinels (1986, US, Robotech sequel, pilot, animated)
- Robotix (1985, animated)
- Rocket Robin Hood (1966–1969, Canada, animated)
- Rocketship 7 (1962–1978, 1992–1993)
- Rod Rocket (1963, animated)
- RollBots (2009–2010, Canada/US, animated)
- Roughnecks: Starship Troopers Chronicles (1999–2000, animated)
- Roswell Conspiracies: Aliens, Myths and Legends (1999–2000, animated)
- Saber Marionette (franchise):
  - Saber Marionette J (1996–1997, Japan, animated)
  - Saber Marionette J to X (1998–1999, Japan, animated)
- Saber Rider and the Star Sheriffs (1987–1988, Japan, animated)
- Samurai Jack (2001–2004, animated)
- Savage Dragon (1995–1996, animated) IMDb
- Secret of Cerulean Sand (2002, Japan, animated)
- Secret Saturdays, The (2008–2010, animated)
- Secret Service, The (1969, UK, puppetry)
- Secret World of Alex Mack, The (1994–1998)
- Secrets of Isis, The (1975–1977)
- Sectaurs (1985, animated)
- Sgt. Frog (2004–2011, Japan, animated)
- Shadow Raiders (1998–1999, Canada, animated)
- Shazam! (1974–1977)
- Sherlock Holmes in the 22nd Century (1999–2001, Scotland, animated)
- Sherlock Hound (1984–1985, Japan, animated)
- Silver Surfer (1998, animated)
- SilverHawks (1986, animated)
- Silversun (2004, Australia)
- Sky Commanders (1987, animated)
- Skyland a.k.a. Skyland, The New World a.k.a. Skyland, Le Nouveau Monde (French) (2005–2007, France/Canada/Luxembourg, animated)
- SKYSURFER Strike Force (1996–1997, animated)
- Slugterra (2012–2016, US/Canada, animated)
- Small Wonder (1985–1989)
- Snorks (1984–1989, Belgium/US, animated) (elements of science fiction)
- So Weird (1999–2001)
- Sonic the Hedgehog (franchise):
  - Adventures of Sonic the Hedgehog a.k.a. AoStH (1993, US/France, animated)
  - Sonic the Hedgehog: The Animated Series a.k.a. Sonic SatAM a.k.a. SatAM (1993–1995, US, animated)
  - Sonic Underground a.k.a. Sonic le Rebelle (1998–1999, France/US, animated)
  - Sonic X (2003–2004, Japan, animated)
- Space Academy (1977–1979)
- Space Ace (1965–1966, Japan, animated)
- Space Angel (1962–1964, animated)
- Space Battleship Yamato a.k.a. Space Cruiser Yamato (franchise):
  - Space Battleship Yamato (1974–1975, Japan, animated)
  - Space Battleship Yamato II (1978–1979, Japan, animated)
  - Yamato: The New Voyage a.k.a. Bon Voyage Yamato (1979, Japan, animated, film)
  - Star Blazers (1979–1984, Space Battleship Yamato adaptation, US/Japan, animated)
  - Space Battleship Yamato III (1980–1981, Japan, animated)
  - Space Battleship Yamato 2199 (2012–2013, Japan, animated)
- Space Carrier Blue Noah a.k.a. Thundersub (US/Canada) a.k.a. Nave Anti-Espacial (Spanish) (1979–1980, Japan, animated)
- Space Cases (1996–1997)
- Space Command (1953–1954, Canada)
- Space Kidettes, The (1966–1967, animated) IMDb
- Space Nova (2021, Australia/Malaysia/Germany, animated)
- Space Patrol (1950–1955)
- Space Runaway Ideon (1980–1981, Japan, animated)
- Space Sentinels a.k.a. The Young Sentinels (1977, animated)
- Space Stars (1981–1982, anthology, animated) (franchise):
  - Herculoids, The (1967–1969, 1981–1982, animated)
  - Astro and the Space Mutts (1981–1982, Jetsons, The spin-off, animated)
  - Space Ghost (1966–1968, animated)
  - Space Ghost Coast to Coast a.k.a. SGC2C (1994–2001, Space Ghost parody, animated)
  - Teen Force (1981–1982, animated)
  - Cartoon Planet (1995–2000, 2012–2014, Space Ghost Coast to Coast spin-off, animated)
- Spaced Out (2002, France/Canada, animated)
- Spadla z oblakov a.k.a. She Came Out of the Blue Sky (1978–1979, Czechoslovakia)
- Spartakus and the Sun Beneath the Sea a.k.a. Mondes Engloutis, Les (The Engulfed Worlds) a.k.a. Shagma and Arkadia (1985–1987, France, animated)
- Sparticle Mystery, The (2011–2013, UK)
- Speed Racer (US adaptation) a.k.a. Mach Go Go Go (Japan) (franchise):
  - Speed Racer (1967–1968, Japan, animated)
  - New Adventures of Speed Racer, The (1993–1994, US, animated)
  - Speed Racer X (1997–2003, Japan/US, animated)
  - Speed Racer: The Next Generation (2008–2013, US, animated)
- Spellbinder (1995, Australia)
- Spider Riders (2006–2007, Canada/Japan, animated)
- Spider-Man (franchise):
  - Spectacular Spider-Man, The (2008–2009, animated)
  - Spider-Man (1967–1970, animated)
  - Spider-Woman (1979–1980, animated)
  - Spider-Man (1981–1982, animated)
  - Spider-Man and His Amazing Friends (1981–1983, animated)
  - Spider-man Unlimited (1999–2001, animated)
  - Spider-Man: The Animated Series (1994–1998, animated)
  - Spider-Man (2017–2020, animated)
  - Spider-Man: The New Animated Series (2003, animated)
  - Spidey Super Stories (1974–1977)
  - Ultimate Spider-Man (2012–2017, animated)
- Spiral Zone (1987, animated)
- Spliced (2010–2011, Canada, animated)
- SpongeBob SquarePants (1999–present, animated) (elements of science fiction in some episodes)
- Stargate Infinity a.k.a. SGI a.k.a. Infinity (2002–2003, animated)
- Star Trek: Prodigy (2021–present, animated)
- Star Wars (franchise):
  - Star Wars Holiday Special, The (1978, special, film)
  - Caravan of Courage: An Ewok Adventure (1984, film)
  - Star Wars: Droids (1985–1986, US/Canada, animated)
  - Star Wars: Ewoks (1985–1986, US/Canada, animated)
  - Ewoks: The Battle for Endor (1985, film)
  - The Great Heep (1986, Star Wars: Droids sequel, animated)
  - R2-D2: Beneath the Dome (2001, mockumentary)
  - Star Wars: Clone Wars (2003–2005, animated)
  - Star Wars: The Legacy Revealed (2007, special, documentary)
  - Star Wars: The Clone Wars (2008–2014, animated)
  - Lego Star Wars: The Quest for R2-D2 (2009, film, animated)
  - Lego Star Wars: The Padawan Menace (2011, special, animated)
  - Star Wars Rebels (2014–2018, animated)
  - Star Wars Resistance (2018–2020, animated)
  - Star Wars: The Bad Batch (2021–2024, animated)
- StarCom: The U.S. Space Force (1987, animated)
- Starship Operators (2005, Japan, animated)
- Static Shock (2000–2004, animated)
- Steven Universe (franchise)
  - Steven Universe (2013–2019, animated)
  - Steven Universe: The Movie (2019, film, animated)
  - Steven Universe Future (2019–2020, animated)
- Stingray (1964–1965, UK, puppetry)
- Storm Hawks (2007–2009, Canada, animated)
- Street Sharks (1994–1995, animated)
- Street Fighter (franchise):
  - Street Fighter II V (1995–1996, Japan, animated)
  - Street Fighter (1995–1997, animated)
- Super Friends (franchise):
  - Super Friends (1973–1974, animated)
  - All-New Super Friends Hour, The (1977–1978, animated)
  - Challenge of the Super Friends (1978, animated)
  - Super Friends (1980–1982, animated)
  - Super Friends: The Legendary Super Powers Show (1984–1985, animated)
  - Super Powers Team: Galactic Guardians, The (1985–1986, animated)
  - World's Greatest Super Friends, The (1979–1980, animated)
- Super Robot Monkey Team Hyperforce Go! a.k.a. SRMTHFG (2004–2006, US/Japan, animated)
- Super Robot Wars (franchise):
  - Super Robot Wars Original Generation: Divine Wars (2006–2007, Japan, animated)
- Superman (franchise):
  - New Adventures of Superman, The (1966–1970, animated)
  - Superman/Aquaman Hour of Adventure, The (1967–1968, animated)
  - Superman (1988, animated)
  - Superman: The Animated Series (1996–2000, animated)
  - Krypto the Superdog (2005–2006, animated)
- Superstretch and Microwoman (1979, animated, Tarzan and the Super 7 segment)
- SWAT Kats: The Radical Squadron (1993–1995, animated)
- Sym-Bionic Titan (2010–2011, animated)
- Tales from the Cryptkeeper (1993–1997, anthology, animated)
- Target Luna (franchise):
  - Target Luna (1960, UK) IMDb
  - Pathfinders in Space (1960, UK, Target Luna sequel) IMDb
  - Pathfinders to Mars (1960–1961, UK, Pathfinders in Space sequel) IMDb
  - Pathfinders to Venus (1961, UK, Pathfinders to Mars sequel) IMDb
- Tattooed Teenage Alien Fighters from Beverly Hills (1994)
- Team Galaxy a.k.a. Le Collège de l'Espace (France) a.k.a. Galaxie Académie (Canada) (2006–2007, France/Italy/Canada, animated)
- Teen Titans (franchise):
  - Teen Titans (2003–2006, animated)
  - New Teen Titans (2012, animated)
  - Teen Titans Go! (2013–present, animated)
- Teenage Mutant Ninja Turtles a.k.a. TMNT (franchise):
  - Teenage Mutant Ninja Turtles (1987–1996, US/Japan, animated)
  - Ninja Turtles: The Next Mutation a.k.a. NT:TNM (1997–1998)
  - Teenage Mutant Ninja Turtles (2003–2009, animated):
  - Teenage Mutant Ninja Turtles: Turtles Forever a.k.a. TMNT: Turtles Forever (2009, animated film)
  - Teenage Mutant Ninja Turtles (2012–2017, animated)
  - Rise of the Teenage Mutant Ninja Turtles (2018–2020, animated)
- Tekkaman (franchise):
  - Tekkaman: The Space Knight (1975, Japan, animated)
  - Tekkaman Blade a.k.a. Teknoman (1992–1993, Japan, animated)
- Tenchi Muyo! (franchise) (elements of science fiction):
  - Tenchi Universe (1995, Japan, animated)
  - Tenchi in Tokyo (1997, Japan, animated)
  - Tenchi Muyo! GXP (2002, Japan, animated)
- Terrahawks (1983–1986, UK, puppetry)
- Tetsujin-28 (franchise):
  - Tetsujin 28-go (1960, Japan)
  - Tetsujin 28-go (1963–1966, Japan, animated)
  - Gigantor (1963–1966, US, adaptation, animated)
  - Shin Tetsujin 28-go (1980–1981, Japan, animated) a.k.a. New Adventures of Gigantor, The (US)
  - Tetsujin 28 FX (1992–1993, Japan, animated)
  - Tetsujin-28 (2004, Japan, animated)
- Tetsuwan Birdy: Decode (2008–2009, Japan, animated)
- Third Eye, The (1981–1983, anthology)
- Thundarr the Barbarian (1980–1982, animated)
- ThunderCats (franchise):
  - ThunderCats (1985–1990, animated)
  - ThunderCats (2011–2012, US/Japan, animated)
- Thunderstone (1999–2000, Australia)
- Tick, The a.k.a. Tick: The Animated Series, The (1994–1996, animated) (elements of science fiction in some episodes)
- Time Bokan (franchise):
  - Time Bokan (1975–1976, Japan, animated)
  - Yatterman (1975–1979, Japan, animated, spin-off)
  - Zenderman (1979–1980, Japan, animated)
  - Rescueman (1980–1981, Japan, animated)
  - Yattodetaman (1981–1982, Japan, animated)
  - Gyakuten! Ippatsuman (1982–1983, Japan, animated)
  - Itadakiman (1982–1983, Japan, animated)
  - Time Bokan 2000: Kaitou Kiramekiman (2000, Japan, animated)
  - Yatterman (2008–2009, Japan, animated, remake)
- Time Jam: Valerian & Laureline (2007–2008, France/Japan, animated)
- Time Squad (2001–2003, animated)
- Time Warp Trio (2005–2006, animated)
- Timeslip (1970, UK)
- Tokyo Underground (2002, Japan, animated)
- Tomorrow People, The (franchise):
  - Tomorrow People, The (1973–1979, UK)
  - Tomorrow People, The (1992–1995)
- Toonami: Total Immersion Events a.k.a. TIEs (franchise) (animated):
  - Intruder, The (2000, interactive, special, micro-series, animated)
  - Lockdown (2001, interactive, special, micro-series, animated)
  - Trapped in Hyperspace (2002, interactive, special, micro-series, animated)
  - Immortal Grand Prix a.k.a. IGPX (2003, Japan/US, interactive, special, micro-series, animated)
  - Immortal Grand Prix a.k.a. IGPX (2005–2006, Japan/US, animated)
- Toxic Crusaders (1991, animated)
- Transformers (franchise):
  - Transformers, The a.k.a. Transformers: Generation 1 a.k.a. Transformers: G1 (1984–1987, animated)
  - Transformers: Generation 2 a.k.a. Transformers: G2 (1993–1995, modified Transformers: G1 rebroadcast, animated)
  - Transformers: The Headmasters (1987–1988, Japan, animated)
  - Transformers: Super-God Masterforce (1988–1989, Japan, animated)
  - Transformers: Victory (1989, Japan, animated)
  - Beast Wars: Transformers (1996–1999, animated)
  - Beast Wars II: Chō Seimeitai Transformers a.k.a. Beast Wars II: Super Life-form Transformers (1998, Japan, animated)
  - Beast Wars Neo (1998–1999, Japan, animated)
  - Beast Machines (1998–2000, Canada/US, animated)
  - Transformers: Robots in Disguise (2000–2001, Japan/US, animated) a.k.a. Transformers: Car Robot (Japan)
  - Transformers: Armada a.k.a. Super Robot Lifeform Transformers: Micron Legend (2001–2003, Japan, animated)
  - Transformers: Energon a.k.a. Transformers: Superlink (2004–2005, Japan, animated)
  - Transformers: Cybertron a.k.a. Transformers: Galaxy Force (2005–2006, Japan, animated)
  - Transformers Animated (2007–2009, US/Japan, animated)
  - Transformers: Prime a.k.a. Transformers: Prime – The Animated Series (2010–2012, US/Japan, animated)
  - Transformers: Rescue Bots (2012–2016, US/Japan, animated)
  - Transformers: Robots in Disguise (2015–2017, animated)
  - Transformers: Cyberverse (2018–2020, animated)
- Tribe, The (franchise):
  - New Tomorrow, The (2006, New Zealand, Tribe, The sequel)
  - Tribe, The (1999–2003, New Zealand)
- Tron: Uprising (2012–2013, animated)
- Ultraforce (1995, animated)
- Ulysses 31 a.k.a. Space Legend Ulysses 31 (Japan) (1981–1982, France/Japan, animated)
- Under the Mountain (1981–1982, New Zealand, miniseries)
- Underdog (1964–1973, animated)
- Unnatural History (2010, US/Canada, anthology) (elements of science fiction in some episodes)
- Valley of the Dinosaurs (1974–1976, animated)
- Video Warrior Laserion (1984–1985, Japan, animated)
- Virus Attack (2011–2012, Italy, animated) Virus Attack, Mondo TV (Italy). Virus Attack, Cartoon Network (Italy) IMDb
- Visionaries: Knights of the Magical Light (1987, animated)
- Voltron (franchise):
  - Voltron a.k.a. Voltron: Defender of the Universe (1984–1985, Japan, animated)
  - Voltron: Fleet of Doom (1986, Japan/US, special, film, animated)
  - Voltron: The Third Dimension (1998–2000, animated)
  - Voltron Force (2011–2012, animated)
  - Voltron: Legendary Defender (2016–2018, animated)
  - Armored Fleet Dairugger XV a.k.a. Dairugger 15 a.k.a. Dairugger XV a.k.a. Armored Armada Dairugger XV a.k.a. Armored Squadron Dairugger XV a.k.a. Machine Platoon Dairugger (1982–1983, Japan, animated, footage used in Voltron: Fleet of Doom)
  - Beast King GoLion a.k.a. GoLion a.k.a. King of the Beasts GoLion (1981–1982, Japan, animated, footage used in Voltron: Fleet of Doom)
- VR Troopers (1994–1996)
- Wallace and Gromit (franchise):
  - A Grand Day Out a.k.a. A Grand Day Out with Wallace and Gromit (1989, UK, stop-motion animation, film)
  - Shaun the Sheep (2007–2010, Wallace and Gromit spin-off, UK, stop-motion animation) (elements of science fiction in The Visitor, Shaun Encounters and Cat Got Your Brain episodes)
- Web Woman (1978–1980, animated, Tarzan and the Super 7 segment)
- Whatever Happened to Robot Jones? (2002–2003, animated)
- Wicked Science (2004–2006, Australia)
- Widget (1990–1991, animated)
- Wild Arms: Twilight Venom (1999–2000, Japan, animated)
- Wild C.A.T.s (1994–1996, animated)
- Wing Commander Academy (1996, animated)
- Wizards vs Aliens (2012–2014, UK)
- Yogi Bear (franchise) (elements of science fiction):
  - Yogi's Space Race (1978, animated)
  - Galaxy Goof-Ups (1978–1979, animated)
- X-Men (franchise):
  - X-Men: Pryde of the X-Men (1989, animated, pilot)
  - X-Men a.k.a. X-Men: The Animated Series (1992–1997, animated)
  - X-Men: Evolution (2000–2003, animated)
  - Wolverine and the X-Men (2008–2009, animated)
  - Marvel Anime: Wolverine (2011, Japan, animated)
  - Marvel Anime: X-Men (2011, Japan, animated)
- Xyber 9: New Dawn (1999, animated)
- Yin Yang Yo! (2006–2009, US/Canada, animated)
- Zack Files, The (2000–2002, Canada)
- Zentrix (2003–2004, Hong Kong, animated)
- Zegapain (2006, Japan, animated)
- Zeta Project, The (2001–2002, animated)
- Zevo-3 (2010–2011, animated)
- Zillion a.k.a. Red Photon Zillion (1987, Japan, animated)
- Zixx (2004–2009, Canada, partly animated)
- Zorro: Generation Z (2008–2009, Germany, animated)

=== Crime fighting, police procedural, and espionage ===
- List of police television dramas
- Adventures of the Galaxy Rangers, The (1986–1989, animated)
- Almost Human (2013–2014)
- Alphas (2011–2012)
- Alien Nation (franchise):
  - Alien Nation (1989–1990)
  - Alien Nation: Dark Horizon (1990, first film)
  - Alien Nation: Body and Soul (1995, second film)
  - Alien Nation: Millennium (1996, third film)
  - Alien Nation: The Enemy Within (1996, fourth film)
  - Alien Nation: The Udara Legacy (1997, fifth film)
- Armored Police Metal Jack (1981, Japan, animated)
- Atomic Betty (2004–2008, Canada, animated)
- Automan (1983–1984)
- Avengers, The (franchise, UK):
  - New Avengers, The (1976–1977, UK, Avengers, The sequel)
  - Avengers, The (1961–1969, UK)
- Black Scorpion (2001)
- Bugs (1995–1999, UK)
- C.O.P.S. (1988, animated)
- Captain Future a.k.a. Capitaine Flam (France), a.k.a. Capitan Futuro (Italy), a.k.a. Capitán Futuro (Spain/Latin America), a.k.a. Knight of Space, The (Arabic) (1978–1979, Japan, animated)
- Department S (1969-1970, UK)
- Dick Spanner, P.I. (1986–1987, UK, stop-motion animation)
- Future Cop (1976–1978)
- Ghost in the Shell: Stand Alone Complex (S.A.C.) (franchise):
  - Ghost in the Shell: Stand Alone Complex (S.A.C.) (2002–2003, Japan, animated)
  - Ghost in the Shell: S.A.C. 2nd GIG (2004–2005, Japan, animated)
  - Ghost in the Shell: Stand Alone Complex – Solid State Society (2006, Japan, film, animated)
- Grande Ourse (2003, Canada) IMDb
- Highwayman, The (1987–1988)
- Holmes & Yo-Yo (1976–1977)
- Hyper Police (1997, Japan, animated)
- Life on Mars (franchise):
  - Life on Mars (2006–2007, UK)
  - Life on Mars (2008–2009, US, Life on Mars remake)
  - Ashes to Ashes (2008–2010, UK, Life on Mars sequel)
  - Chica de Ayer, La a.k.a. Girl from Yesterday, The (2009, Spain, Life on Mars remake)
- M.A.N.T.I.S. (1994–1995)
- M.A.S.K. (1985–1986, animated)
- Middleman, The (2008)
- Minority Report (2015)
- Person of Interest (2011–2016)
- Phantom, The (franchise):
  - Phantom, The (2009, miniseries)
  - Phantom 2040 (1994–1996, animated)
- RoboCop (franchise):
  - RoboCop: The Series (1994, Canada)
  - RoboCop: Prime Directives (2001, Canada, miniseries)
  - RoboCop: The Animated Series (1988, animated)
  - RoboCop: Alpha Commando (1998–1999, animated)
- Sky Commanders (1987, animated)
- SoltyRei (2005–2006, Japan, animated)
- Space Precinct (franchise):
  - Space Police (1986, Space Precinct pilot)
  - Space Precinct (1994–1995)
- Star Cops (1987, UK)
- Street Hawk (1985)
- Stripperella (2003–2004, animated) (elements of science fiction)
- Team Galaxy a.k.a. Le Collège de l'Espace (France) a.k.a. Galaxie Académie (Canada) (2006–2007, France/Italy/Canada, animated)
- TekWar (franchise):
  - Tekwar a.k.a. Tekwar: The Movie (1994, Canada/US, first film)
  - TekWar: TekLords a.k.a. TekLords (1994, Canada/US, second film)
  - TekLab (1994, Canada/US, third film)
  - TekJustice a.k.a. Tekjustice: The Final Showdown (1994, Canada/US, fourth film)
  - TekWar (1995–1996, Canada/US)
- Time Trax (1993–1994)
- Timecop (1997–1998)
- Torchwood (2006–2011, UK, Doctor Who spin-off):
  - Torchwood: Children of Earth (2009, miniseries, third season)
  - Torchwood: Miracle Day (2011, fourth season)
- Total Recall 2070 (1999, Canada)
- VR.5 (1995)
- Wonder Woman (franchise):
  - Wonder Woman (2011, pilot) IMDb
  - Wonder Woman (1975–1979)
  - Wonder Woman (1974, film, pilot) IMDb
  - Who's Afraid of Diana Prince? (1967) IMDb
- X-Files, The (1993–2002, 2016–2018)

=== Cyberpunk ===
- List of cyberpunk works: Animation
- List of cyberpunk works: Television and Web Series
- Bubblegum Crisis Tokyo 2040 (1998–1999, Japan, animated)
- Altered Carbon (2018–2020)
- Burst Angel (2004, Japan, animated)
- Charlie Jade (2005, Canada/South Africa)
- Continuum (2012–2015, Canada)
- Cybersix (franchise):
  - Cybersix (1995, Argentina)
  - Cybersix (1999, Canada/Argentina, animated)
- Dark Angel (2000–2002)
- Dollhouse (2009–2010)
- Ergo Proxy (2006, Japan, animated)
- Ghost in the Shell: Stand Alone Complex (S.A.C.) (franchise):
  - Ghost in the Shell: Stand Alone Complex (S.A.C.) (2002–2003, Japan, animated)
  - Ghost in the Shell: S.A.C. 2nd GIG (2004–2005, Japan, animated)
  - Ghost in the Shell: S.A.C. Solid State Society (2006, Japan, film, animated)
- Harsh Realm (1999–2000, Canada/US)
- Heat Guy J (2002–2003, Japan, animated)
- Max Headroom (franchise):
  - Max Headroom: 20 Minutes into the Future (1985, UK, film)
  - Max Headroom (1987–1988)
- Psycho-Pass (2012–2013, Japan, animated)
- RoboCop: Prime Directives (2001, Canada, miniseries)
- Serial Experiments Lain (1998, Japan, animated)
- Silent Möbius (1998, Japan, animated)
- Spicy City (1997, anthology, animated)
- TekWar (franchise):
  - Tekwar a.k.a. Tekwar: The Movie (1994, Canada/US, first film)
  - TekWar: TekLords a.k.a. TekLords (1994, Canada/US, second film)
  - TekLab (1994, Canada/US, third film)
  - TekJustice a.k.a. Tekjustice: The Final Showdown (1994, Canada/US, fourth film)
  - TekWar (1995–1996, Canada/US)
- Texhnolyze (2003, Japan, animated)
- Total Recall 2070 (1999, Canada)
- Welcome to Paradox (1998)
- Wild Palms (1993, miniseries)
- X-Files, The (1993–2002, 2016–2018) (in this and this episode)

=== Cyborgs and robots ===
- Cyborgs in fiction: Television
- List of fictional robots and androids: Animated shorts/series
- List of fictional robots and androids: Television films and series
- List of fictional gynoids: In animation
- List of fictional gynoids: In US television
- 009-1 (2006, Japan, animated)
- Almost Human (2013–2014)
- Andro-Jäger, Der (1982–1984, Germany)
- Android Announcer Maico 2010 (1998, Japan, animated)
- Astro Boy (franchise):
  - Astro Boy (1963–1966, Japan, animated)
  - Astro Boy (1980–1981, Japan, animated)
  - Astro Boy (2003–2004, Japan, animated)
- Battlestar Galactica (franchise):
  - Battlestar Galactica (1978–1979)
  - Galactica 1980 (1980, Battlestar Galactica 1978 spin-off)
  - Battlestar Galactica (2004–2009)
  - Battlestar Galactica (2003, miniseries)
  - Battlestar Galactica: Razor (2007, film)
  - Battlestar Galactica: The Plan (2009, film)
  - Caprica (2010–2011, Battlestar Galactica 2004 prequel)
  - Battlestar Galactica: Blood & Chrome (2011, pilot)
- Beyond Westworld (1980)
- Big Guy and Rusty the Boy Robot, The (1999–2001, animated)
- Bionic Six (1987–1989, animated)
- Bionic Woman (franchise):
  - Bionic Woman, The (1976–1978)
  - Bionic Woman (2007)
- Cubix (2001–2003, South Korea, animated) a.k.a. Cubix: Robots for Everyone (US)
- Cybersix (franchise):
  - Cybersix (1995, Argentina)
  - Cybersix (1999, Canada/Argentina, animated)
- Cyborg 009 (franchise):
  - Cyborg 009 (1968, Japan, animated)
  - Cyborg 009 (1979–1980, Japan, animated)
  - Cyborg 009 (2001–2002, Japan, animated)
- Doraemon (franchise):
  - Doraemon (1973, Japan, animated)
  - Doraemon (1979–2005, Japan, animated)
  - Doraemon (2005–present, Japan, animated)
- Fireball (franchise):
  - Fireball (2009, Japan/US, animated)
  - Fireball Charming (2011, Japan/US, animated)
- Giant Robo (franchise):
  - Giant Robo (1967–1968, Japan) a.k.a. Johnny Sokko and his Flying Robot (US)
  - GR: Giant Robo (2007, Japan, animated)
- GoBots (franchise):
  - GoBots (1984, miniseries, animated)
  - Challenge of the GoBots a.k.a. Mighty Machine Men (1985, animated)
- Guyver: The Bioboosted Armor (2005–2006, Japan, animated)
- Hand Maid May (2000, Japan, animated)
- Heroman (2010, Japan, animated)
- Humans (2015–2018)
- Iron King (1972–1973, Japan)
- Jetter Mars (1977, Japan, animated)
- Lost Saucer, The (1975–1976)
- Real Humans (2012–2013, Sweden)
- Robotboy (2005–2008, UK/France/US, animated)
- Robotix (1985, animated)
- Robotomy (2010, animated)
- RollBots (2009–2010, Canada/US, animated)
- Saber Marionette (franchise):
  - Saber Marionette J (1996–1997, Japan, animated)
  - Saber Marionette J to X (1998–1999, Japan, animated)
- Six Million Dollar Man, The (1974–1978)
- Sonic the Hedgehog (franchise):
  - Adventures of Sonic the Hedgehog a.k.a. AoStH (1993, US/France, animated)
  - Sonic the Hedgehog: The Animated Series a.k.a. Sonic SatAM a.k.a. SatAM (1993–1995, US, animated)
  - Sonic Underground a.k.a. Sonic le Rebelle (1998–1999, France/US, animated)
  - Sonic X (2003–2004, Japan, animated)
- Super Robot Monkey Team Hyperforce Go! a.k.a. SRMTHFG (2004–2006, US/Japan, animated)
- TekWar (franchise):
  - Tekwar a.k.a. Tekwar: The Movie (1994, Canada/US, first film)
  - TekWar: TekLords a.k.a. TekLords (1994, Canada/US, second film)
  - TekLab (1994, Canada/US, third film)
  - TekJustice a.k.a. Tekjustice: The Final Showdown (1994, Canada/US, fourth film)
  - TekWar (1995–1996, Canada/US)
- Terminator: The Sarah Connor Chronicles (2008–2009)
- Tetsujin-28 (franchise):
  - Tetsujin 28-go (1960, Japan)
  - Tetsujin 28-go (1963–1966, Japan, animated)
  - Gigantor (1963–1966, US, adaptation, animated)
  - Shin Tetsujin 28-go (1980–1981, Japan, animated) a.k.a. New Adventures of Gigantor, The (US)
  - Tetsujin 28 FX (1992–1993, Japan, animated)
  - Tetsujin-28 (2004, Japan, animated)
- Toonami: Total Immersion Events a.k.a. TIEs (franchise) (animated):
  - Intruder, The (2000, interactive, special, micro-series, animated)
  - Lockdown (2001, interactive, special, micro-series, animated)
  - Trapped in Hyperspace (2002, interactive, special, micro-series, animated)
  - Immortal Grand Prix a.k.a. IGPX (2003, Japan/US, interactive, special, micro-series, animated)
  - Immortal Grand Prix a.k.a. IGPX (2005–2006, Japan/US, animated)
- Transformers (franchise):
  - Transformers, The a.k.a. Transformers: Generation 1 a.k.a. Transformers: G1 (1984–1987, animated)
  - Transformers: Generation 2 a.k.a. Transformers: G2 (1993–1995, modified Transformers: G1 rebroadcast, animated)
  - Transformers: The Headmasters (1987–1988, Japan, animated)
  - Transformers: Super-God Masterforce (1988–1989, Japan, animated)
  - Transformers: Victory (1989, Japan, animated)
  - Beast Wars: Transformers (1996–1999, animated)
  - Beast Wars II: Chō Seimeitai Transformers a.k.a. Beast Wars II: Super Life-form Transformers (1998, Japan, animated)
  - Beast Wars Neo (1998–1999, Japan, animated)
  - Beast Machines (1998–2000, Canada/US, animated)
  - Transformers: Robots in Disguise (2000–2001, Japan/US, animated) a.k.a. Transformers: Car Robot (Japan)
  - Transformers: Armada a.k.a. Super Robot Lifeform Transformers: Micron Legend (2001–2003, Japan, animated)
  - Transformers: Energon a.k.a. Transformers: Superlink (2004–2005, Japan, animated)
  - Transformers: Cybertron a.k.a. Transformers: Galaxy Force (2005–2006, Japan, animated)
  - Transformers Animated (2007–2009, US/Japan, animated)
  - Transformers: Prime a.k.a. Transformers: Prime – The Animated Series (2010–2012, US/Japan, animated)
  - Transformers: Rescue Bots (2012–2016, US/Japan, animated)
  - Transformers: Robots in Disguise (2015–2017, animated)
- Westworld (2016–2022)
- Whatever Happened to Robot Jones? (2002–2003, animated)
- Zentrix (2003–2004, Hong Kong, animated)
- Zeta Project, The (2001–2002, animated)

=== Disaster and destruction ===
- List of apocalyptic and post-apocalyptic fiction
- Babylon 5 (franchise):
  - Babylon 5 (1993–1998)
  - Babylon 5: A Call to Arms (1999, fourth film)
  - Babylon 5: In the Beginning (1998, first film)
  - Babylon 5: The Gathering (1993, pilot)
  - Babylon 5: The Legend of the Rangers (2002, spin-off film)
  - Babylon 5: The Lost Tales (2007, anthology)
  - Babylon 5: The River of Souls (1998, third film)
  - Babylon 5: Thirdspace (1998, second film)
  - Crusade (1999, Babylon 5 spin-off)
- Doom Runners (1997, Australia, film)
- Doomwatch (1970–1972, UK)
- Jericho (2006–2008)
- Odyssey 5 (2002, Canada)
- Survivors (franchise):
  - Survivors (2008–2010, UK)
  - Survivors (1975–1977, UK)
- Thunderbirds (1965–1966, UK, puppetry)

=== Explorers from Earth on alien world(s) ===
- Planets in science fiction: Animation
- Planets in science fiction: Film and television
- Earth 2 (1994–1995)
- Hot Wheels (franchise):
  - Hot Wheels AcceleRacers (2005, animated)
  - Hot Wheels Battle Force 5 a.k.a. Battle Force 5 (UK/Ireland) (2009–2011, animated)
- Outcasts (2011, UK)
- Red Faction: Origins (2011, pilot, film)
- Red Planet (miniseries) (1994, miniseries, animated)
- Space Nova (2021, Australia/Malaysia/Germany, animated)
- Stargate (franchise):
  - Stargate Atlantis a.k.a. SGA (2004–2009, Canada/US)
  - Stargate Infinity a.k.a. SGI a.k.a. Infinity (2002–2003, animated)
  - Stargate SG-1 a.k.a. SG-1 (1997–2007, Canada/US, ship-based seasons 6–10)
  - Stargate Universe a.k.a. SGU (2009–2011, Canada/US)
- Star Trek (franchise):
  - Star Trek: The Original Series (1966–1969)
  - Star Trek: The Animated Series (1973–1974, animated)
  - Star Trek: The Next Generation (1987–1994)
  - Star Trek: Deep Space Nine (1993–1999)
  - Star Trek: Voyager (1995–2001)
  - Star Trek: Enterprise (2001–2005)
  - Star Trek: Discovery (2017–2024)
  - Star Trek: Strange New Worlds (2022–present)

=== Life in the future ===
- Alternate future
- Æon Flux (1991–1995, animated)
- Andromeda (2000–2005)
- Babylon 5 (franchise):
  - Babylon 5 (1993–1998)
  - Babylon 5: A Call to Arms (1999, fourth film)
  - Babylon 5: In the Beginning (1998, first film)
  - Babylon 5: The Gathering (1993, pilot)
  - Babylon 5: The Legend of the Rangers (2002, spin-off film)
  - Babylon 5: The Lost Tales (2007, anthology)
  - Babylon 5: The River of Souls (1998, third film)
  - Babylon 5: Thirdspace (1998, second film)
  - Crusade (1999, Babylon 5 spin-off)
- BattleTech: The Animated Series (1994, animated)
- Buck Rogers in the 25th Century (1979–1981)
- Buzz Lightyear of Star Command (2000–2002, animated)
- Century City (2004–2005)
- Cleopatra 2525 (2000–2001)
- Dan Dare: Pilot of the Future (2001, UK, animated)
- Defenders of the Earth (1986–1987, animated)
- Dex Hamilton: Alien Entomologist (2007, Canada/Australia/UK, animated)
- Dragon Flyz (1996–1997, France, animated)
- Duck Dodgers (franchise):
  - Duck Dodgers in the 24½th Century (1953, animated)
  - Duck Dodgers and the Return of the 24½th Century (1980, animated)
  - Duck Dodgers (2003–2006, animated)
- Earth 2100 (2009, special, docufiction)
- Flash Gordon (franchise):
  - Flash Gordon (1954–1955)
  - New Adventures of Flash Gordon, The a.k.a. Adventures of Flash Gordon, The a.k.a. Flash Gordon (1979–1980, animated)
  - Flash Gordon: The Greatest Adventure of All (1982, animated)
  - Flash Gordon a.k.a. The Adventures of Flash Gordon, The (1996–1997, US/France/Canada, animated)
  - Flash Gordon (2007–2008, US/Canada)
- Firefly (2002–2003)
- FTL Newsfeed (1992–1996, clip)
- Futurama (1999–2003, 2008–2013, 2023–present, animated)
- Future is Wild, The (franchise):
  - Future is Wild, The (2003–2004, UK/Austria/Germany, docufiction, animated)
  - Future is Wild, The (2007–2008, US, docufiction, animated)
- Gangster World (1998, film) a.k.a. The Outsider IMDb
- Genesis II (franchise):
  - Genesis II (1973, film, pilot)
  - Planet Earth (1974, film, pilot)
  - Strange New World (1975, film, pilot)
- Highwayman, The (1987–1988)
- Jeremiah (2002–2004)
- Jetsons, The (1962–1963, 1985–1987, animated)
- L5: First City in Space (1996, docufiction) IMDb
- Lloyd in Space (2001–2004, animated)
- Logan's Run (1977–1978)
- Loonatics Unleashed (2004–2007, animated)
- Lost Future, The (2010, film) IMDb
- Mann & Machine (1992)
- Max Headroom (franchise):
  - Max Headroom: 20 Minutes into the Future (1985, UK, film)
  - Max Headroom (1987–1988)
- Megas XLR (2004–2005, animated)
- Men into Space (1959–1960)
- MetaJets (2008–2010, South Korea/Canada, animated)
- Monster Force (1994, animated) (elements of science fiction)
- Needless (2009, Japan, animated)
- Outcasts (2011, UK)
- Partridge Family 2200 A.D. (1974, animated)
- Planet of the Apes (franchise):
  - Planet of the Apes (1974)
  - Saru No Gundan a.k.a. Sci-fi Drama: Army of Monkeys (1974–1975, Planet of the Apes spin-off, Japan)
  - Return to the Planet of the Apes (1975–1976, animated)
  - Time of the Apes (1987, film, Saru No Gundan compilation, Japan)
- Red Dwarf (1988–1999, 2009–2017, UK)
- Rocky Jones, Space Ranger (1954)
- Rod Brown of the Rocket Rangers (1953–1954)
- Samurai Jack (2001–2004, animated)
- seaQuest DSV (1993–1996)
- Space: 1999 (1975–1977, Britain)
- Sherlock Holmes in the 22nd Century (1999–2001, Scotland, animated)
- Star Trek (franchise):
  - Star Trek: The Original Series (1966–1969)
  - Star Trek: The Animated Series (1973–1974, animated)
  - Star Trek: The Next Generation (1987–1994)
  - Star Trek: Deep Space Nine (1993–1999)
  - Star Trek: Voyager (1995–2001)
  - Star Trek: Enterprise (2001–2005)
  - Star Trek: Discovery (2017–2024)
  - Star Trek: Picard (2020–2023)
  - Star Trek: Lower Decks (2020–present, animated)
  - Star Trek: Strange New Worlds (2022–present)
- Terra Nova (2011)
- Tribe, The (franchise):
  - New Tomorrow, The (2006, New Zealand, Tribe, The sequel)
  - Tribe, The (1999–2003, New Zealand)
- URBO: The Adventures of Pax Afrika (2006, South Africa, animated)
- Utopia Falls (2020)
- Xenosaga: The Animation (2005, Japan, animated)
- Xyber 9: New Dawn (1999, animated)
- Zorro: Generation Z (2008–2009, Germany, animated)

=== Mecha ===
- Mecha genres
- Mecha anime and manga
- Acrobunch (1982, Japan, animated)
- Aldnoah.Zero (2014–2015, Japan, animated)
- Argevollen (2014, Japan, animated)
- Armored Trooper Votoms (1983–1984, Japan, animated)
- Astroganger (1972–1973, Japan, animated)
- Aura Battler Dunbine (1983–1984, Japan, animated)
- BattleTech: The Animated Series (1994, animated)
- Big O, The (1999–2000, 2003, Japan, animated)
- Blocker Gundan 4 Machine Blaster (1976–1977, Japan, animated)
- Blue Comet SPT Layzner (1985–1986, Japan, animated) a.k.a. Blue Meteor SPT Layzner (US)
- Brave series (franchise)
  - Brave Exkaiser (1990–1991, Japan, animated)
  - Brave Fighter of Sun Fighbird, The (1991–1992, Japan, animated)
  - Brave Fighter of Legend Da-Garn, The (1992–1993, Japan, animated)
  - Brave Express Might Gaine, The (1993–1994, Japan, animated)
  - Brave Police J-Decker (1994–1995, Japan, animated)
  - Brave of Gold Goldran, The (1995–1996, Japan, animated)
  - Brave Command Dagwon (1996–1997, Japan, animated)
  - King of Braves GaoGaiGar, The (1997–1998, Japan, animated)
  - Betterman (1999, Japan, animated)
  - King of Braves GaoGaiGar Final -Grand Glorious Gathering-, The (2005, Japan, animated)
- Buddy Complex (2014, Japan, animated)
- Candidate for Goddess, The (2000, Japan, animated)
- Captain Earth (2014, Japan, animated)
- Chō Kōsoku Galvion (1984, Japan, animated)
- Chōdenji Machine Voltes V (1977–1978, Japan, animated)
- Chōdenji Robo Combattler V (1976–1977, Japan, animated)
- Chojin Sentai Barattack (1977–1978, Japan, animated)
- Code Geass (franchise):
  - Code Geass: Lelouch of the Rebellion a.k.a. Code Geass (2006–2007, Japan, animated)
  - Code Geass: Lelouch of the Rebellion R2 (2008, Japan, animated)
- Combat Mecha Xabungle (1982–1983, Japan, animated)
- Dancouga – Super Beast Machine God (1985, Japan, animated)
- Exosquad (1993–1994, animated)
- Fang of the Sun Dougram (1981–1983, Japan, animated)
- Full Metal Panic! a.k.a. FMP! (franchise):
  - Full Metal Panic? Fumoffu (2003, Japan, animated)
  - Full Metal Panic!: The Second Raid (2006, Japan, animated)
- Gaiking (franchise):
  - Gaiking (1976–1977, Japan, animated)
  - Gaiking: Legend of Daiku-Maryu (2005–2006, Japan, animated)
- Gasaraki (1998–1999, Japan, animated)
- Genesis Climber MOSPEADA (1983–1984, Japan, animated)
- Getter Robo (franchise):
  - Getter Robo (1974–1975, Japan, animated)
  - Getter Robo G (1975–1976, Japan, animated)
  - Getter Robo Go (1991–1992, Japan, animated)
- Giant Gorg (1984, Japan, animated)
- Ginga Hyōryū Vifam (franchise):
  - Ginga Hyōryū Vifam (1983–1984, Japan, animated)
  - Ginga Hyōryū Vifam 13 (1998, Japan, animated)
- Ginga Kikoutai Majestic Prince (2013, Japan, animated)
- Goliath the Super Fighter (1976, Japan, animated)
- Gordian Warrior (1979–1981, Japan, animated)
- GoShogun (1981, Japan, animated)
- Groizer X (1976–1977, Japan, animated)
- Gundam (franchise):
  - Mobile Suit Gundam (1979–1980, Japan, animated)
  - Mobile Suit Zeta Gundam (1985–1986, Japan, animated)
  - Mobile Suit Gundam ZZ (1986–1987, Japan, animated)
  - Mobile Suit Victory Gundam (1993–1994, Japan, animated)
  - Mobile Fighter G Gundam (1994–1995, Japan, animated)
  - Mobile Suit Gundam Wing (1995–1996, Japan, animated)
  - After War Gundam X a.k.a. Mobile New Century Gundam X (1996, Japan, animated)
  - Turn A Gundam a.k.a. ∀ Gundam (1999, Japan, animated)
  - G-Saviour (2000, US/Japan, film)
  - Mobile Suit Gundam SEED (2002–2003, Japan, animated)
  - Superior Defender Gundam Force (2004, Japan, animated)
  - Mobile Suit Gundam SEED Destiny (2004–2005, Japan, animated)
  - Mobile Suit Gundam 00 (2007–2009, Japan, animated)
  - SD Gundam Sangokuden Brave Battle Warriors (2010–2011, Japan, animated)
  - Mobile Suit Gundam AGE (2011–2012, Japan, animated)
  - Gundam Build Fighters (2013–2014, Japan, animated)
  - Gundam Reconguista in G (2014–2015, Japan, animated)
  - Gundam Build Fighters Try (2014–2015, Japan, animated)
  - Mobile Suit Gundam: Iron-Blooded Orphans (2015–2017, Japan, animated)
  - Gundam Build Divers (2018, Japan, animated)
- Heavy Gear: The Animated Series (2001, Canada, animated)
- Heavy Metal L-Gaim (1984–1985, Japan, animated)
- Heavy Object (2015, Japan, animated)
- Invincible Steel Man Daitarn 3 a.k.a. Unchallengeable Daitarn 3, The (1978–1979, Japan, animated)
- Invincible Super Man Zambot 3 a.k.a. Super Machine Zambot 3 (1977–1978, Japan, animated)
- J9 (franchise):
  - Braiger (1981–1982, Japan, animated)
  - Baxingar (1982–1983, Japan, animated)
  - Sasuraiger (1983–1984, Japan, animated)
- Knights of Sidonia (2014–2015, Japan, animated)
- Lightspeed Electroid Albegas (1983–1984, Japan, animated)
- Macross (franchise):
  - Super Dimension Fortress Macross, The (1982–1983, Japan, animated)
  - Super Dimension Cavalry Southern Cross (1984, Japan, animated)
  - Super Dimension Century Orguss (1983–1984, Japan, animated)
  - Macross 7 (1994–1995, Japan, animated)
  - Macross Frontier (2008, Japan, animated)
  - Macross Delta (2016, Japan, animated)
- Magne Robo Gakeen (1976–1977, Japan, animated)
- Mazinger (franchise):
  - Mazinger Z (1972–1974, Japan, animated) a.k.a. Tranzor Z (US)
  - Great Mazinger (1974–1975, Japan, animated)
  - Grendizer (1975–1977, Japan, animated)
  - God Mazinger (1984, Japan, animated)
  - Shin Mazinger Shougeki! Z Hen (2009, Japan, animated)
- Mech-X4 (2016–2018)
- Mechander Robo (1977, Japan, animated)
- Nadesico (franchise):
  - Martian Successor Nadesico a.k.a. Mobile Battleship Nadesico a.k.a. Nadesico (1996–1997, Japan, animated)
  - Gekiganger III (1996–1997, Japan, clips within Martian Successor Nadesico, animated)
- Megas XLR (2004–2005, animated)
- Metal Armor Dragonar (1987–1988, Japan, animated)
- Mirai Robo Daltanious (1979–1980, Japan, animated)
- Neon Genesis Evangelion (1995–1996, Japan, animated)
- Ninja Senshi Tobikage a.k.a. Ninja Robot Tobikage a.k.a. Ninja Robots (US) (1985–1986, Japan, animated)
- Panzer World Galient (1984–1985, Japan, animated)
- Patlabor: The TV Series (1989–1990, Japan, animated)
- Psycho Armor Govarian (1983–1984, Japan, animated)
- Robotech (adaptation) (franchise):
  - Codename: Robotech (1985, US, animated, pilot)
  - Robotech (1985, 3 anime television series adaptation, US/Japan, animated)
  - Robotech II: The Sentinels (1986, US, Robotech sequel, pilot, animated)
- Saber Rider and the Star Sheriffs (1987–1988, Japan, animated)
- Six God Combination Godmars (1981–1982, Japan, animated)
- Space Emperor God Sigma (1980–1981, Japan, animated)
- Space Runaway Ideon (1980–1981, Japan, animated)
- Space Warrior Baldios (1980–1981, Japan, animated)
- Special Armored Battalion Dorvack (1983–1984, Japan, animated)
- Steel Jeeg (1976–1976, Japan, animated)
- Super Robot Wars (franchise):
  - Super Robot Wars Original Generation: Divine Wars (2006–2007, Japan, animated)
- Sym-Bionic Titan (2010–2011, animated)
- Tōshō Daimos (1978–1979, Japan, animated)
- Trider G7 (1980–1981, Japan, animated)
- UFO Warrior Dai Apolon (1976–1977, Japan, animated)
- Valvrave the Liberator (2012–2013, Japan, animated)
- Video Warrior Laserion (1984–1985, Japan, animated)
- Viper's Creed (1999, Japan, animated)
- Visionaries: Knights of the Magical Light (1987, animated)
- Voltron (franchise):
  - Voltron a.k.a. Voltron: Defender of the Universe (1984–1985, Japan, animated)
  - Voltron: Fleet of Doom (1986, Japan/US, special, film, animated)
  - Voltron: The Third Dimension (1998–2000, animated)
  - Voltron Force (2011–2012, animated)
  - Voltron: Legendary Defender (2016–2018, animated)
  - Armored Fleet Dairugger XV a.k.a. Dairugger 15 a.k.a. Dairugger XV a.k.a. Armored Armada Dairugger XV a.k.a. Armored Squadron Dairugger XV a.k.a. Machine Platoon Dairugger (1982–1983, Japan, animated, footage used in Voltron: Fleet of Doom)
  - Beast King GoLion a.k.a. GoLion a.k.a. King of the Beasts GoLion (1981–1982, Japan, animated, footage used in Voltron: Fleet of Doom)
- Wakusei Robo Danguard Ace (1977–1978, Japan, animated)
- Xenosaga: The Animation (2005, Japan, animated)
- Zegapain (2006, Japan, animated)

=== Military ===
- Interstellar war
- List of military science fiction: Television and film
- Space warfare in fiction: Television and movies
- Andromeda (2000–2005)
- Armored Trooper Votoms (1983–1984, Japan, animated)
- Babylon 5 (franchise):
  - Babylon 5 (1993–1998)
  - Babylon 5: A Call to Arms (1999, fourth film)
  - Babylon 5: In the Beginning (1998, first film)
  - Babylon 5: The Gathering (1993, pilot)
  - Babylon 5: The Legend of the Rangers (2002, spin-off film)
  - Babylon 5: The Lost Tales (2007, anthology)
  - Babylon 5: The River of Souls (1998, third film)
  - Babylon 5: Thirdspace (1998, second film)
  - Crusade (1999, Babylon 5 spin-off)
- Battlestar Galactica (franchise):
  - Battlestar Galactica (1978–1979)
  - Galactica 1980 (1980, Battlestar Galactica 1978 spin-off)
  - Battlestar Galactica (2004–2009)
  - Battlestar Galactica (2003, miniseries)
  - Battlestar Galactica: Razor (2007, film)
  - Battlestar Galactica: The Plan (2009, film)
  - Battlestar Galactica: Blood & Chrome (2011, pilot)
- BattleTech: The Animated Series (1994, animated)
- Blue Comet SPT Layzner (1985–1986, Japan, animated) a.k.a. Blue Meteor SPT Layzner (US)
- Crest of the Stars Trilogy (franchise):
  - Crest of the Stars (1999, Japan, animated)
  - Banner of the Stars (2001, Japan, animated)
  - Banner of the Stars II (2001, Japan, animated)
- Exosquad (1993–1994, animated)
- Gasaraki (1998–1999, Japan, animated)
- Genesis Climber MOSPEADA (1983–1984, Japan, animated)
- Gundam (franchise):
  - Mobile Suit Gundam (1979–1980, Japan, animated)
  - Mobile Suit Zeta Gundam (1985–1986, Japan, animated)
  - Mobile Suit Gundam ZZ (1986–1987, Japan, animated)
  - Mobile Suit Victory Gundam (1993–1994, Japan, animated)
  - Mobile Fighter G Gundam (1994–1995, Japan, animated)
  - Mobile Suit Gundam Wing (1995–1996, Japan, animated)
  - After War Gundam X a.k.a. Mobile New Century Gundam X (1996, Japan, animated)
  - G-Saviour (2000, US/Japan, film)
  - Mobile Suit Gundam SEED (2002–2003, Japan, animated)
  - Mobile Suit Gundam SEED Destiny (2004–2005, Japan, animated)
  - BB Senshi Sangokuden (2010, Japan, animated)
- Halo (2022–present)
- Legend of the Galactic Heroes: Die Neue These (2018, Japan, animated)
- Macross (franchise):
  - Super Dimension Fortress Macross, The (1982–1983, Japan, animated)
  - Super Dimension Cavalry Southern Cross (1984, Japan, animated)
  - Macross Frontier (2008, Japan, animated)
- Robotech (adaptation) (franchise):
  - Codename: Robotech (1985, US, animated, pilot)
  - Robotech (1985, 3 anime television series adaptation, US/Japan, animated)
  - Robotech II: The Sentinels (1986, US, Robotech sequel, pilot, animated)
- Roughnecks: Starship Troopers Chronicles (1999–2000, animated)
- seaQuest DSV renamed seaQuest 2032 for third season (1993–1996)
- Space: Above and Beyond (1995–1996)
- Space Battleship Yamato a.k.a. Space Cruiser Yamato (franchise):
  - Space Battleship Yamato (1974–1975, Japan, animated)
  - Space Battleship Yamato II (1978–1979, Japan, animated)
  - Yamato: The New Voyage a.k.a. Bon Voyage Yamato (1979, Japan, animated, film)
  - Star Blazers (1979–1984, Space Battleship Yamato adaptation, US/Japan, animated)
  - Space Battleship Yamato III (1980–1981, Japan, animated)
  - Space Battleship Yamato 2199 (2012–2013, Japan, animated)
- Stargate (franchise):
  - Stargate Atlantis a.k.a. SGA (2004–2009, Canada/US)
  - Stargate Infinity a.k.a. SGI a.k.a. Infinity (2002–2003, animated)
  - Stargate SG-1 a.k.a. SG-1 (1997–2007, Canada/US, ship-based seasons 6–10)
  - Stargate Universe a.k.a. SGU (2009–2011, Canada/US)
- Star Trek (franchise):
  - Star Trek: The Original Series (1966–1969)
  - Star Trek: The Animated Series (1973–1974, animated)
  - Star Trek: The Next Generation (1987–1994)
  - Star Trek: Deep Space Nine (1993–1999)
  - Star Trek: Voyager (1995–2001)
  - Star Trek: Enterprise (2001–2005)
  - Star Trek: Discovery (2017–2024)
  - Star Trek: Lower Decks (2020–present, animated)
  - Star Trek: Strange New Worlds (2022–present)
- Starship Operators (2005, Japan, animated)
- Strain: Strategic Armored Infantry (2006–2007, Japan, animated)
- Strike Witches (franchise):
  - Strike Witches (2008, Japan, animated)
  - Strike Witches 2 (2010, Japan, animated)
- Wing Commander Academy (1996, animated)

=== Parallel universes ===
- List of fictional extraterrestrial universes: In film and television
- List of fictional parallel worlds: In film and television
- List of other fictional worlds: In film and television
- List of fictional multiverses: In film and television
- Parallel universe: Television
- Charlie Jade (2005, Canada/South Africa)
- Counterpart (2017-2019)
- Flash, The (2014–2023)
- Disney's Fluppy Dogs (1986, special, animated)
- Fringe (2008–2013)
- Land of the Giants (1968–1970)
- Land of the Lost (franchise):
  - Land of the Lost (1974–1976)
  - Land of the Lost (1991–1992, Land of the Lost remake)
- Otherworld (1985)
- Parallax (2004, Australia)
- Sliders (1995–2000)
- Spellbinder (1995, Australia)
- Super Dimension Century Orguss (1983–1984, Japan, animated)
- Valley of the Dinosaurs (1974–1976, animated)

=== Paranormal investigation ===
- Paranormal television
- Baywatch Nights (1995–1997) (elements of science fiction in season 2 episodes)
- Beyond Reality (1991–1993) (elements of science fiction in some episodes)
- Chronicle, The (2001–2002) (elements of science fiction in some episodes)
- Delta State (2004–2006, France/Canada, animated) IMDb
- Eleventh Hour (franchise):
  - Eleventh Hour (2006, UK)
  - Eleventh Hour (2008–2009)
- Freaky (2003, New Zealand)
- FreakyLinks (2000–2001) (elements of science fiction in some episodes)
- Fringe (2008–2013)
- Ghostbusters (franchise):
  - Extreme Ghostbusters (1997, animated)
  - Real Ghostbusters, The (1986–1991, animated)
- Night Stalker (franchise):
  - Night Stalker (2005–2006, Kolchak: The Night Stalker remake)
  - Kolchak: The Night Stalker (1974–1975)
- Others, The (2000)
- Project UFO (1978–1979)
- Psi Factor: Chronicles of the Paranormal (1996–2000, Canada)
- Roswell Conspiracies: Aliens, Myths and Legends (1999–2000, animated)
- Secret Saturdays, The (2008–2010, animated)
- Silent Möbius (1998, Japan, animated)
- Special Unit 2 (2001–2002)
- Total Recall 2070 (1999, Canada)
- Ultraviolet (1998, UK) (elements of science fiction)
- X-Files, The (franchise) (elements of science fiction in some episodes):
  - X-Files, The (1993–2002, 2016–2018)
  - Lone Gunmen, The (2001, X-Files, The spin-off)
- Zack Files, The (2000–2002, Canada)

=== Satire and comedy ===
- Comic science fiction: Television
- 3rd Rock from the Sun (1996–2001)
- Aaron Stone (2009–2010, US/Canada)
- Adventures of Don Quick, The (1970, UK)
- ALF (franchise):
  - ALF: The Animated Series (1987–1989, ALF spin-off, animated)
  - Project ALF (1996, ALF sequel, film)
  - ALF (1986–1990)
- Alien News Desk (2019, animated)
- Aliens in the Family (1996)
- Amazing Screw-On Head, The (2006, pilot, animated)
- Andro-Jäger, Der (1982–1984, Germany)
- Android Announcer Maico 2010 (1998, Japan, animated)
- Angel Links (1999, Japan, animated)
- Archie (franchise) (elements of science fiction):
  - The Archie Show (1968–1969, animated)
  - Archie's TV Funnies (1971–1973, animated)
  - New Archie and Sabrina Hour, The (1977, animated)
  - New Archies, The (1987, animated)
  - Archie: To Riverdale and Back Again (1990, film)
  - Archie's Weird Mysteries (1999–2000, animated)
- Astronauts (1981, UK)
- Attack of the Killer Tomatoes: The Animated Series (1990–1992, animated)
- Avenue 5 (2020–2022)
- Batman (franchise):
  - Batman (1966–1968)
  - Batman: The Brave and the Bold (2008–2011, animated)
- Battletoads (1992, Canada/US, special, pilot, animated)
- BrainDead (2016)
- Bucky O'Hare and the Toad Wars (1991, UK/US, animated)
- Captain Simian & the Space Monkeys (1996–1997, animated)
- Cavemen (2007) (elements of science fiction)
- Chobits (2002, Japan, animated)
- Chronicle, The (2001–2002) (elements of science fiction in some episodes)
- Clone (2008, UK)
- Code 404 (2020–2022, UK)
- Come Back Mrs. Noah (1977–1978, UK)
- Cosmic Quantum Ray (2009, Germany, animated)
- Courage the Cowardly Dog (1999–2002, animated) (elements of science fiction in some episodes)
- Coyote Ragtime Show (2006, Japan, animated)
- Dallas & Robo (2018, animated)
- Dan Vs. (2011–2013, animated) (elements of science fiction in some episodes)
- Dans une galaxie près de chez vous a.k.a. In a galaxy near you (1998–2001, Canada)
- Darkwing Duck (1991–1992, animated) (elements of science fiction in some episodes)
- Dexter's Laboratory (franchise):
  - Dexter's Laboratory a.k.a. Dexter's Lab (1996–2003, animated)
  - Dial M for Monkey (1996–1999, Dexter's Laboratory backup segment, animated)
  - Justice Friends, The (1996–1998, Dexter's Laboratory backup segment, animated)
- Dirty Pair (1985, Japan, animated)
- Doraemon (franchise):
  - Doraemon (1973, Japan, animated)
  - Doraemon (1979–2005, Japan, animated)
  - Doraemon (2005–present, Japan, animated)
- Dr. Slump (franchise):
  - Dr. Slump – Arale-chan (1981–1986, Japan, animated)
  - Doctor Slump (1997–1999, Japan, animated)
- Eureka (2006–2012)
- Evil Con Carne (2003–2004, animated)
- Excel Saga (1999–2000, Japan, animated)
- Family Guy (1999–present, animated) (franchise) (elements of science fiction in some episodes):
  - Blue Harvest (2007, episode, animated)
  - Something, Something, Something, Dark Side (2010, episode, animated)
  - It's a Trap! (2011, episode, animated)
- Family's Defensive Alliance, The (2001, Japan, animated)
- Far Out Space Nuts (1975–1976)
- Final Space (2018–2021, animated)
- Freezing (2011–2013, Japan, animated)
- Frisky Dingo (franchise):
  - Frisky Dingo (2006–2008, animated)
  - Xtacles, The (2008, spin-off, animated)
- Futurama (1999–2003, 2008–2013, animated)
- Future Man (2017–2020)
- Galaxy Angel (franchise):
  - Galaxy Angel (2001–2002, Japan, animated)
  - Galaxy Angel Z (2002, Japan, animated)
  - Galaxy Angel A (2002, Japan, animated)
  - Galaxy Angel AA (2003, Japan, animated)
  - Galaxy Angel S (2003, Japan, special, animated)
  - Galaxy Angel X (2004, Japan, animated)
  - Galaxy Angel Rune (2006, Japan, animated)
- Garth Marenghi's Darkplace (2004, UK)
- Gate Keepers (2000, Japan, animated)
- Gilligan's Planet (1982–1983, animated)
- Gintama (franchise):
  - Gintama (2006–2010, Japan, animated)
  - Yorinuki Gintama-san (2010–2011, Japan, animated)
  - Gintama' (2011–2013, Japan, animated)
- Goodnight Sweetheart (1993–1999, UK)
- Harrison Bergeron (1995, film)
- Harvey Birdman, Attorney at Law (2000–2007, animated)
- Hilarious House of Frightenstein, The (1971, Canada)
- Hitchhiker's Guide to the Galaxy, The (1981, UK)
- Holmes & Yo-Yo (1976–1977)
- Homeboys in Outer Space (1996–1997)
- Honey, I Shrunk the Kids (1997–2000)
- Hyper Police (1997, Japan, animated)
- Hyperdrive (2006–2007, UK)
- Ijon Tichy: Space Pilot (2007, Germany)
- Invader Zim (2001–2002, 2006, animated)
- Infinite Stratos (2011–2013, Japan, animated)
- It's About Time (1966–1967)
- Jetsons, The (1962–1963, 1985–1987, animated)
- Jimmy Two-Shoes (2009–2011, Canada/UK/US, animated)
- Jing: King of Bandits (2002, Japan, animated)
- Johnny Test (2005–2014, animated)
- Kinvig (1981, UK)
- Lab Rats (2008, UK) (elements of science fiction)
- League of Super Evil a.k.a. L.O.S.E. (2009–2012, Canada, animated)
- Lego Star Wars: The Quest for R2-D2 (2009, film, animated)
  - Lego Star Wars: The Padawan Menace (2011, special, animated)
- Lost in Space (1965–1968)
- Lost Saucer, The (1975–1976)
- Luna (1983–1984, UK)
- Mahoromatic (franchise):
  - Mahoromatic: Automatic Maiden (2001–2002, Japan, animated)
  - Mahoromatic: Something More Beautiful (2002–2003, Japan, animated)
- Marvin Marvin (2012–2013)
- Medabots a.k.a. Medarot (1999–2001, Japan, animated)
- Meego (1997)
- Metal Fighter Miku (1994, Japan, animated)
- Metal Mickey (1980–1983, UK)
- Mighty Boosh, The (2004–2007, UK) (elements of science fiction in some episodes)
- Mike and Angelo (1989–2000, UK)
- Mork & Mindy (1978–1982)
- My Favorite Martian (franchise):
  - My Favorite Martian (1963–1966)
  - My Favorite Martians (1973–1975, animated)
- My Hero (2000–2006, UK)
- My Life as a Teenage Robot (2002–2006, animated)
- My Living Doll (1964–1965)
- My Parents Are Aliens (1999–2006, UK)
- Mystery Science Theater 3000 a.k.a. MST3K (1988–1999)
- Nadesico (franchise):
  - Martian Successor Nadesico a.k.a. Mobile Battleship Nadesico a.k.a. Nadesico (1996–1997, Japan, animated)
  - Gekiganger III (1996–1997, Japan, clips within Martian Successor Nadesico, animated)
- Neighbors, The (2012–2014)
- NieA 7 a.k.a. NieA under 7 (2000, Japan, Animated)
- No Ordinary Family (2010–2011)
- Not with a Bang (1990, UK)
- Orville, The (2017–present)
- Other Space (2015)
- Out of This World (1987–1991)
- Outer Space Astronauts (2009, partly animated)
- Owl, The a.k.a. La Chouette (2003–2006, France, shorts, animated) (elements of science fiction in the Flying Saucer episode)
- Ozzy & Drix a.k.a. The Fantastic Voyage Adventures of Osmosis Jones & Drixenol (2002–2004, animated)
- Phil of the Future (2004–2006)
- Plastic Man (franchise):
  - Plastic Man (2006, pilot, animated)
  - Plastic Man Comedy/Adventure Show, The (1979–1981, animated)
  - Mighty Man and Yukk (1979–1980, Plastic Man Comedy/Adventure Show, The segment, animated)
  - Rickety Rocket (1979–1980, Plastic Man Comedy/Adventure Show, The segment, animated)
- Powerpuff Girls, The (1998–2005, animated)
- Quark (1977–1978)
- Ray the Animation (2006, Japan, animated)
- Red Dwarf (1988–1999, 2009–2017, UK)
- Rick and Morty (2013–present, animated)
- Robot Chicken (2005–present, stop-motion animation) (elements of science fiction in this and this episode)
- Robotboy (2005–2008, UK/France/US, animated)
- Robotomy (2010, animated)
- Saber Marionette (franchise):
  - Saber Marionette J (1996–1997, Japan, animated)
  - Saber Marionette J to X (1998–1999, Japan, animated)
- Sealab 2021 (2000–2005, animated)
- Second Hundred Years, The (1967–1968)
- Sgt. Frog (2004–2011, Japan, animated)
- Small Wonder (1985–1989)
- Solar Opposites (2020–present, animated)
- Space Battleship Tiramisu (2018, Japan, animated)
- Space Ghost Coast to Coast a.k.a. SGC2C (1994–2001, Space Ghost parody, animated)
- Spaceballs: The Animated Series (2008, animated)
- Space Dandy (2014, Japan, animated)
- Spaced Out (2002, France/Canada, animated)
- Spliced (2010–2011, Canada, animated)
- Starhyke (2011, UK)
- Star Trek: Lower Decks (2020–2024, animated)
- Strangerers, The (2000, UK)
- Tenchi Muyo! (franchise) (elements of science fiction):
  - Tenchi Universe (1995, Japan, animated)
  - Tenchi in Tokyo (1997, Japan, animated)
  - Tenchi Muyo! GXP (2002, Japan, animated)
- Tick, The (franchise):
  - Tick, The a.k.a. Tick: The Animated Series, The (1994–1996, animated) (elements of science fiction in some episodes)
  - Tick, The (2001–2002) (elements of science fiction)
- Time Squad (2001–2003, animated)
- Titan Maximum (2009, stop-motion animation)
- Tripping the Rift (2004–2007, Canada, animated)
- Unnatural History (2010, US/Canada, anthology) (elements of science fiction in some episodes)
- Wallace and Gromit (franchise):
  - A Grand Day Out a.k.a. A Grand Day Out with Wallace and Gromit (1989, UK, stop-motion animation, film)
  - Shaun the Sheep (2007–2010, Wallace and Gromit spin-off, UK, stop-motion animation) (elements of science fiction in The Visitor, Shaun Encounters and Cat Got Your Brain episodes)
- Weird City (2019)
- Whatever Happened to Robot Jones? (2002–2003, animated)
- Woops! (1992)
- Yin Yang Yo! (2006–2009, US/Canada, animated)
- Zombieland (2013, pilot)

=== Space opera ===
- List of space opera media: Anime
- List of space opera media: Film and television
- Babylon 5 (franchise):
  - Babylon 5 (1993–1998)
  - Babylon 5: A Call to Arms (1999, fourth film)
  - Babylon 5: In the Beginning (1998, first film)
  - Babylon 5: The Gathering (1993, pilot)
  - Babylon 5: The Legend of the Rangers (2002, spin-off film)
  - Babylon 5: The Lost Tales (2007, anthology)
  - Babylon 5: The River of Souls (1998, third film)
  - Babylon 5: Thirdspace (1998, second film)
  - Crusade (1999, Babylon 5 spin-off)
- Battlestar Galactica (franchise):
  - Battlestar Galactica (1978–1979)
  - Galactica 1980 (1980, Battlestar Galactica 1978 spin-off)
  - Battlestar Galactica (2004–2009)
  - Battlestar Galactica (2003, miniseries)
  - Battlestar Galactica: Razor (2007, film)
  - Battlestar Galactica: The Plan (2009, film)
  - Battlestar Galactica: Blood & Chrome (2011, pilot)
- Captain Future a.k.a. Capitaine Flam (France), a.k.a. Capitan Futuro (Italy), a.k.a. Capitán Futuro (Spain/Latin America), a.k.a. Knight of Space, The (Arabic) (1978–1979, Japan, animated)
- Captain Harlock (manga) (franchise):
  - Space Pirate Captain Harlock (1978–1979, Japan, animated)
  - Galaxy Express 999 (1978–1981, Japan, animated)
  - Space Symphony Maetel (2004–2005, Japan, Galaxy Express 999 sequel, animated)
  - Space Pirate Captain Herlock: The Endless Odyssey (2002, Japan, animated)
  - Harlock Saga (1998–1999, Japan, animated)
  - Arcadia of My Youth: Endless Orbit SSX (1982–1983, Japan, animated)
  - Queen Emeraldas (1998–1999, Japan, animated)
  - Captain Harlock and the Queen of a Thousand Years (1985–1986, US/Japan, animated)
  - Queen Millennia (1981–1982, Japan, animated)
- Captain Video and His Video Rangers (1949–1955)
- Cobra (franchise):
  - Space Cobra (1982–1983, Japan, animated)
  - Cobra the Animation: Rokunin no Yushi (2010, Japan, animated)
- Cowboy Bebop (1998–1999, Japan, animated)
- Crest of the Stars Trilogy (franchise):
  - Crest of the Stars (1999, Japan, animated)
  - Banner of the Stars (2001, Japan, animated)
  - Banner of the Stars II (2001, Japan, animated)
- Dark Matter (2015–2017, Canada)
- Eureka Seven (2005–2006, Japan, animated)
- Expanse, The (2015–2022)
- Farscape (franchise):
  - Farscape (1999–2003, Australia/US)
  - Farscape: The Peacekeeper Wars (2004, miniseries)
- Final Space (2018–2021, animated)
- Firefly (2002–2003)
- Foundation (2021–present)
- Genesis Climber MOSPEADA (1983–1984, Japan, animated)
- Guardians of the Galaxy (2015–2019, animated)
- Gundam (franchise):
  - Mobile Suit Gundam (1979–1980, Japan, animated)
  - Mobile Suit Zeta Gundam (1985–1986, Japan, animated)
  - Mobile Suit Gundam ZZ (1986–1987, Japan, animated)
  - Mobile Suit Victory Gundam (1993–1994, Japan, animated)
  - Mobile Fighter G Gundam (1994–1995, Japan, animated)
  - Mobile Suit Gundam Wing (1995–1996, Japan, animated)
  - After War Gundam X a.k.a. Mobile New Century Gundam X (1996, Japan, animated)
  - Turn A Gundam a.k.a. ∀ Gundam (1999, Japan, animated)
  - G-Saviour (2000, US/Japan, film)
  - Mobile Suit Gundam SEED (2002–2003, Japan, animated)
  - Superior Defender Gundam Force (2004, Japan, animated)
  - Mobile Suit Gundam SEED Destiny (2004–2005, Japan, animated)
  - Mobile Suit Gundam 00 (2007–2009, Japan, animated)
  - SD Gundam Sangokuden Brave Battle Warriors (2010–2011, Japan, animated)
  - Mobile Suit Gundam AGE (2011–2012, Japan, animated)
- Irresponsible Captain Tylor, The (1993–1996, Japan, animated)
- Killjoys (2015–2019, Canada)
- Knights of Sidonia (2014–2015, Japan, animated)
- Legend of the Galactic Heroes: Die Neue These (2018, Japan, animated)
- Lensman: Power of the Lens (1984–1985, Japan, animated)
- Macross (franchise):
  - Super Dimension Fortress Macross, The (1982–1983, Japan, animated)
  - Super Dimension Cavalry Southern Cross (1984, Japan, animated)
  - Macross 7 (1994–1995, Japan, animated)
  - Macross Frontier (2008, Japan, animated)
  - Macross Delta (2016, Japan, animated)
- Orville, The (2017–present)
- Outlaw Star (1998, Japan, animated)
- Pandora (2019–2020)
- Power Rangers (franchise):
  - Power Rangers in Space (1998)
  - Power Rangers: Lost Galaxy (1999)
- Robotech (adaptation) (franchise):
  - Codename: Robotech (1985, US, animated, pilot)
  - Robotech (1985, 3 anime television series adaptation, US/Japan, animated)
  - Robotech II: The Sentinels (1986, US, Robotech sequel, pilot, animated)
- Space Battleship Yamato a.k.a. Space Cruiser Yamato (franchise):
  - Space Battleship Yamato (1974–1975, Japan, animated)
  - Space Battleship Yamato II (1978–1979, Japan, animated)
  - Yamato: The New Voyage a.k.a. Bon Voyage Yamato (1979, Japan, animated, film)
  - Star Blazers (1979–1984, Space Battleship Yamato adaptation, US/Japan, animated)
  - Space Battleship Yamato III (1980–1981, Japan, animated)
  - Space Battleship Yamato 2199 (2012–2013, Japan, animated)
- Space Dandy (2014, Japan, animated)
- Space Patrol (1950–1955)
- Space Patrol (1963–1964, UK) a.k.a. Planet Patrol (US)
- Space Runaway Ideon (1980–1981, Japan, animated)
- Star Trek (franchise):
  - Star Trek: The Original Series (1966–1969)
  - Star Trek: The Animated Series (1973–1974, animated)
  - Star Trek: The Next Generation (1987–1994)
  - Star Trek: Deep Space Nine (1993–1999)
  - Star Trek: Voyager (1995–2001)
  - Star Trek: Enterprise (2001–2005)
  - Star Trek: Discovery (2017–2024)
  - Star Trek: Picard (2020–2023)
  - Star Trek: Lower Decks (2020–present, animated)
  - Star Trek: Prodigy (2021–present, animated)
  - Star Trek: Strange New Worlds (2022–present)
- Star Wars (franchise):
  - Star Wars Holiday Special, The (1978, special, film)
  - Caravan of Courage: An Ewok Adventure (1984, film)
  - Star Wars: Droids (1985–1986, US/Canada, animated)
  - Star Wars: Ewoks (1985–1986, US/Canada, animated)
  - Ewoks: The Battle for Endor (1985, film)
  - The Great Heep (1986, Star Wars: Droids sequel, animated)
  - R2-D2: Beneath the Dome (2001, mockumentary)
  - Star Wars: Clone Wars (2003–2005, animated)
  - Star Wars: The Legacy Revealed (2007, special, documentary)
  - Star Wars: The Clone Wars (2008–2014, animated)
  - Lego Star Wars: The Quest for R2-D2 (2009, film, animated)
  - Lego Star Wars: The Padawan Menace (2011, special, animated)
  - Star Wars Rebels (2014–2018, animated)
  - Star Wars Resistance (2018–2020, animated)
  - The Mandalorian (2019–present)
  - Star Wars: The Bad Batch (2021–2024, animated)
  - The Book of Boba Fett (2021)
  - Obi-Wan Kenobi (2022)
  - Andor (2022–present)
  - Ahsoka (2023)
  - Skeleton Crew (2023)
  - The Acolyte
- Star Wolf (1978, Japan)
- Stargate (franchise):
  - Stargate Atlantis a.k.a. SGA (2004–2009, Canada/US)
  - Stargate SG-1 a.k.a. SG-1 (1997–2007, Canada/US, ship-based seasons 6–10)
  - Stargate Universe a.k.a. SGU (2009–2011, Canada/US)
- Starship Operators (2005, Japan, animated)
- Starzinger (1978–1979, Japan, animated)
- Tom Corbett, Space Cadet (1950–1955)
- Toward the Terra (2007, Japan, animated)
- Tytania (2008–2009, Japan, animated)
- Time Jam: Valerian & Laureline (2007–2008, France/Japan, animated)
- Vagrant Queen (2020)
- Vandread (franchise):
  - Vandread (2000, Japan, animated)
  - Vandread: The Second stage (2001, Japan, animated)

=== Space station based ===
- Space stations and habitats in popular culture
- Babylon 5 (franchise):
  - Babylon 5 (1993–1998)
  - Babylon 5: A Call to Arms (1999, fourth film)
  - Babylon 5: In the Beginning (1998, first film)
  - Babylon 5: The Gathering (1993, pilot)
  - Babylon 5: The Legend of the Rangers (2002, spin-off film)
  - Babylon 5: The Lost Tales (2007, anthology)
  - Babylon 5: The River of Souls (1998, third film)
  - Babylon 5: Thirdspace (1998, second film)
- Infinite Ryvius (1999–2000, Japan, animated)
- Mercy Point (1998–1999)
- Prisoners of Gravity (1989–1994, Canada, documentary)
- Space Island One (1998, UK/Germany)
- Space Precinct (franchise):
  - Space Police (1986, Space Precinct pilot)
  - Space Precinct (1994–1995)
- Star Cops (1987, UK)
- Star Trek: Deep Space Nine a.k.a. ST:DS9 (1993–1999, third series, ship-based seasons 3–7)

=== Space western ===
- Science fiction Western: Television
- Space western: Television
- Adventures of the Galaxy Rangers, The (1986–1989, animated)
- BraveStarr (1987–1988, animated)
- Cowboy Bebop (1998–1999, Japan, animated)
- Fireball XL5 (1962–1963, puppetry)
- Firefly (2002–2003)
- Gun X Sword a.k.a. Gun vs. Sword (2005–2006, Japan, animated)
- The Mandalorian (2019–present)
- Outlaw Star (1998, Japan, animated)
- Red Faction: Origins (2011, pilot, film)
- Saber Rider and the Star Sheriffs (1987–1988, Japan, animated)
- SilverHawks (1986, animated)
- Space Patrol (1963–1964, UK) a.k.a. Planet Patrol (US)
- Space Rangers (1993)
- Star Trek (franchise):
  - Star Trek: The Original Series (1966–1969)
  - Star Trek: The Animated Series (1973–1974, animated)
- Trigun (1998, Japan, animated)
- Wild Arms: Twilight Venom (1999–2000, Japan, animated)

=== Spaceship based ===
- List of fictional spacecraft
- Andromeda (2000–2005)
- Another Life (2019–2021)
- Avenue 5 (2020–2022)
- Away (2020)
- Battlestar Galactica (franchise):
  - Battlestar Galactica (1978–1979)
  - Galactica 1980 (1980, Battlestar Galactica 1978 spin-off)
  - Battlestar Galactica (2004–2009)
  - Battlestar Galactica (2003, miniseries)
  - Battlestar Galactica: Razor (2007, film)
  - Battlestar Galactica: The Plan (2009, film)
  - Battlestar Galactica: Blood & Chrome (2011, pilot)
- Blake's 7 (1978–1981)
- Blindpassasjer (1978, Norway)
- Buck Rogers in the 25th Century (second season)
- Captain Future a.k.a. Capitaine Flam (France), a.k.a. Capitan Futuro (Italy), a.k.a. Capitán Futuro (Spain/Latin America), a.k.a. Knight of Space, The (Arabic) (1978–1979, Japan, animated)
- Captain Star (1997–1998, UK/Canada/Spain, animated)
- Cowboy Bebop (1998–1999, Japan, animated)
- Crusade (1999, Babylon 5 spin-off)
- Dark Matter (2015–2017, Canada)
- Defying Gravity (2009)
- Earth Star Voyager (1988, pilot, film)
- Expanse, The (2015–2022)
- Far Out Space Nuts (1975–1976)
- Farscape (franchise):
  - Farscape (1999–2003, Australia/US)
  - Farscape: The Peacekeeper Wars (2004, miniseries)
- Final Space (2018–2021, animated)
- Fireball XL5 (1962–1963, puppetry)
- Firefly (2002–2003)
- Hyperdrive (2006–2007, UK)
- Hypernauts (1996)
- Irresponsible Captain Tylor, The (1993–1996, Japan, animated)
- Jason of Star Command (1978–1979, Tarzan and the Super 7 segment)
- Jupiter Moon (1990, UK)
- Killjoys (2015–2019, Canada)
- Knights of Sidonia (2014–2015, Japan, animated)
- Lexx (1997–2002, Canada/UK/Germany)
- Lost in Space (franchise)
  - Lost in Space (1965–1968)
  - Lost in Space (2018–2021)
- Lost Saucer, The (1975–1976)
- Martian Successor Nadesico a.k.a. Mobile Battleship Nadesico a.k.a. Nadesico (1996–1997, Japan, animated)
- Mission Genesis (US) a.k.a. Deepwater Black (UK/Canada) (1997)
- Mobile Suit Gundam (1979–1980, Japan, animated)
- Nightflyers (2018)
- Origin (2018)
- Orville, The (2017–present)
- Other Space (2015)
- Outer Space Astronauts (2009, partly animated)
- Outlaw Star (1998, Japan, animated)
- Phoenix Five (1970, Australia)
- Planetes (2003–2004, Japan, animated)
- Quark (1977–1978)
- Raumpatrouille – Die phantastischen Abenteuer des Raumschiffes Orion (1966, Germany) a.k.a. Space Patrol – The Fantastic Adventures of the Spaceship Orion (US)
- Red Dwarf (1988–1999, 2009–2017, UK)
- Rocky Jones, Space Ranger (1954)
- Salvage 1 (1979)
- Silversun (2004, Australia)
- Space: 1999 (1975–1978, UK)
- Space: Above and Beyond (1995–1996)
- Space Battleship Yamato a.k.a. Space Cruiser Yamato (franchise):
  - Space Battleship Yamato (1974–1975, Japan, animated)
  - Space Battleship Yamato II (1978–1979, Japan, animated)
  - Yamato: The New Voyage a.k.a. Bon Voyage Yamato (1979, Japan, animated, film)
  - Star Blazers (1979–1984, Space Battleship Yamato adaptation, US/Japan, animated)
  - Space Battleship Yamato III (1980–1981, Japan, animated)
  - Space Battleship Yamato 2199 (2012–2013, Japan, animated)
- Space Carrier Blue Noah a.k.a. Thundersub (US/Canada) a.k.a. Nave Anti-Espacial (Spanish) (1979–1980, Japan, animated)
- Space Cases (1996–1997)
- Space Dandy (2014, Japan, animated)
- Space Patrol (1963–1964, UK) a.k.a. Planet Patrol (US)
- Space Rangers (1993)
- Star Trek (franchise):
  - Star Trek: The Original Series (1966–1969)
  - Star Trek: The Animated Series (1973–1974, animated)
  - Star Trek: The Next Generation (1987–1994)
  - Star Trek: Deep Space Nine (1993–1999) (ship-based seasons 3–7)
  - Star Trek: Voyager (1995–2001)
  - Star Trek: Enterprise (2001–2005)
  - Star Trek: Discovery (2017–2024)
  - Star Trek: Picard (2020–2023)
  - Star Trek: Lower Decks (2020–present, animated)
  - Star Trek: Prodigy (2021–present, animated)
  - Star Trek: Strange New Worlds (2022–present)
- Star Wars Rebels (2014–2018, animated)
- Stargate (franchise):
  - Stargate SG-1 a.k.a. SG-1 (1997–2007, Canada/US, ship-based seasons 6–10)
  - Stargate Atlantis a.k.a. SGA (2004–2009, Canada/US)
  - Stargate Universe a.k.a. SGU (2009–2011, Canada/US)
- Starhunter (2000–2004, Canada)
- Starhyke (2011, UK)
- Starlost, The (1973–1974, Canada)
- Starship Operators (2005, Japan, animated)
- Super Dimension Fortress Macross, The (1982–1983, Japan, animated)
- Tom Corbett, Space Cadet (1950–1955)
- Vagrant Queen (2020)
- Vandread (franchise):
  - Vandread (2000, Japan, animated)
  - Vandread: The Second stage (2001, Japan, animated)
- Virtuality (2009, pilot, film)
- Wing Commander Academy (1996, animated)

=== Steampunk ===
- List of steampunk works: In television
- Twenty Thousand Leagues Under the Seas (franchise):
  - 20,000 Leagues Under the Sea (1985, Australia, film, animated)
  - 20,000 Leagues Under the Sea (1997, Hallmark, film)
  - 20,000 Leagues Under the Sea (1997, Village Roadshow, film)
  - 20,000 Leagues Under the Sea (2002, film, animated) IMDb
- Adventures of Brisco County, Jr., The (1993–1994)
- Alice (2009, miniseries)
- Captain Harlock (manga) (franchise):
  - Space Pirate Captain Harlock (1978–1979, Japan, animated)
  - Galaxy Express 999 (1978–1981, Japan, animated)
  - Space Symphony Maetel (2004–2005, Japan, Galaxy Express 999 sequel, animated)
  - Space Pirate Captain Herlock: The Endless Odyssey (2002, Japan, animated)
  - Harlock Saga (1998–1999, Japan, animated)
  - Arcadia of My Youth: Endless Orbit SSX (1982–1983, Japan, animated)
  - Queen Emeraldas (1998–1999, Japan, animated)
  - Captain Harlock and the Queen of a Thousand Years (1985–1986, US/Japan, animated)
  - Queen Millennia (1981–1982, Japan, animated)
- D.Gray-man (2006–2008, Japan, animated)
- Doctor Who (franchise)
- Fullmetal Alchemist (franchise):
  - Fullmetal Alchemist a.k.a. Hagane no Renkinjutsushi (2003–2004, Japan, animated)
  - Fullmetal Alchemist: Brotherhood a.k.a. Hagane no Renkinjutsushi: Furumetaru Arukemisuto (2009–2010, Japan, animated)
- Future Boy Conan (1978, Japan, animated)
- Jack of All Trades (2000)
- Last Exile (franchise):
  - Last Exile (2003, Japan, animated)
  - Last Exile: Fam, the Silver Wing (2011, Japan, animated, Last Exile sequel)
- Legend (1995)
- Mysterious Island (franchise):
  - Mysterious Island, The a.k.a. La isla misteriosa y el capitán Nemo (1973, Spain, miniseries)
  - Mysterious Island (1995)
  - Mysterious Island (2005, film)
- Nadia: The Secret of Blue Water (franchise):
  - Nadia: The Secret of Blue Water a.k.a. Fushigi no Umi no Nadia (1990–1991, Japan, animated)
  - Nadia: The Secret of Fuzzy (1992, Japan, animated, film)
- R.O.D -THE TV- (2003–2004, Japan, animated)
- Secret Adventures of Jules Verne, The (2000)
- Skyland a.k.a. Skyland, The New World a.k.a. Skyland, Le Nouveau Monde (French) (2005–2007, France/Canada/Luxembourg, animated)
- Tin Man (2007, miniseries)
- Voyagers! (1982–1983)
- White Dwarf (1995, film) White Dwarf IMDb
- Wild Wild West, The (1965–1969)
- World Destruction: Sekai Bokumetsu no Rokunin a.k.a. World Destruction: The Six People That Will Destroy the World (2008, Japan, animated)

=== Superbeings ===
- List of superhero television series
- Superhero fiction: Animation
- Superhero fiction: Live-action television series
- Superhuman: Science fiction
- 4400, The (2004–2007)
- Action Man (franchise):
  - Action Man (1995, UK, animated)
  - Action Man (2000, UK, animated)
  - A.T.O.M. (Alpha Teens On Machines) (2005–2006, Action Man spin-off, France, animated)
- Agents of S.H.I.E.L.D. (2013–2020)
- Alphas (2011–2012)
- Aquaman (1968–1970, animated)
- Avengers, The (franchise):
  - Avengers Assemble (2013–2019, animated)
  - Avengers: Earth's Mightiest Heroes, The (2010–2012, animated)
  - Avengers: United They Stand, The (1999–2000, animated)
- Batman (franchise):
  - Batman (1966–1968)
  - Batman/Superman Hour, The (1968–1969, animated)
  - Adventures of Batman and Robin the Boy Wonder, The (1969–1970, animated)
  - New Adventures of Batman, The (1977–1981, animated)
  - Batman: The Animated Series (1992–1995, animated)
  - New Batman Adventures, The a.k.a. TNBA (1997–1999, Batman: The Animated Series sequel, animated)
  - Batman Beyond (1999–2001, animated)
  - Batman, The (2004–2008, animated)
  - Batman: The Brave and the Bold (2008–2011, animated)
  - Beware the Batman (2013–2014, animated)
- Battletoads (1992, Canada/US, special, pilot, animated)
- Ben 10 (franchise):
  - Ben 10 (2005–2008, animated)
  - Ben 10: Secret of the Omnitrix (2007, animated, film)
  - Ben 10: Race Against Time (2007, film)
  - Ben 10: Alien Force (2008–2010, animated)
  - Ben 10: Alien Swarm (2009, film)
  - Ben 10: Ultimate Alien (2010–2012, animated)
  - Ben 10: Destroy All Aliens a.k.a. Ben 10: Alien Dimensions (2012, film, animated)
  - Ben 10: Omniverse (2012–2014, animated)
  - Ben 10 (2016–2021, animated)
- Bionic Woman (franchise):
  - Bionic Woman, The (1976–1978)
  - Bionic Woman (2007)
- Birdman and the Galaxy Trio (1967–1969, animated)
- Birds of Prey (2002–2003)
- Black Panther (2010, animated)
- Black Scorpion (2001)
- Cape, The (2011) (elements of science fiction)
- Captain Planet and the Planeteers (1993–1996, animated)
- Captain Scarlet (franchise):
  - Captain Scarlet and the Mysterons (1967–1968, UK, puppetry)
  - Captain Scarlet vs the Mysterons (1980, Captain Scarlet and the Mysterons compilation, puppetry, film)
  - Revenge of the Mysterons from Mars (1981, Captain Scarlet and the Mysterons compilation, puppetry, film)
  - New Captain Scarlet (2005, UK, animated)
- Captain Simian & the Space Monkeys (1996–1997, animated)
- Cyborg 009 (franchise):
  - Cyborg 009 (1968, Japan, animated)
  - Cyborg 009 (1979–1980, Japan, animated)
  - Cyborg 009 (2001–2002, Japan, animated)
- Daredevil (2015–2018)
- Dark Angel (2000–2002)
- DC Nation Shorts (2012, shorts, animated)
- Dino Squad (2007–2008, animated)
- Earth vs. the Spider (2001, film)
- Fantastic Four (franchise):
  - Fantastic Four (1967–1970, animated)
  - Fantastic Four (1978, animated)
  - Fantastic Four (1994–1996, animated)
  - Fantastic Four: World's Greatest Heroes (2006–2007, animated)
- Firebreather (2010, film, animated)
- Firestarter: Rekindled (2002, miniseries)
- Flash, The (franchise):
  - Flash, The (1990–1991)
  - Flash, The (2014–2023)
- Freedom Force, The (1978, animated, Tarzan and the Super 7 segment)
- Gatchaman (franchise):
  - Science Ninja Team Gatchaman a.k.a. Gatchaman (1972–1974, Japan, animated)
  - Gatchaman II a.k.a. Science Ninja Team Gatchaman II (1978–1979, Japan, animated)
  - Battle of the Planets (1978–1985, Science Ninja Team Gatchaman adaptation, US/Japan, animated)
  - Gatchaman Fighter a.k.a. Science Ninja Team Gatchaman Fighter (1979–1980, Japan, animated)
  - G-Force: Guardians of Space (1986, Science Ninja Team Gatchaman adaptation, US/Japan, animated)
  - Eagle Riders (1996–1997, Gatchaman II and Gatchaman Fighter adaptation, US/Australia/Japan, animated)
- Generation X (1996, film)
- Generator Rex (2010–2013, animated)
- Godzilla (franchise):
  - Zone Fighter a.k.a. Ryusei Ningen Zone (1973, Japan)
  - Godzilla (1978–1981, Japan/US, animated)
  - Godzilla Island (1997–1998, Japan)
  - Godzilla: The Series (1998–2000, US/Japan, animated)
- Greatest American Hero, The (1981–1983)
- Green Lantern: The Animated Series (2011–2013, animated)
- He-Man and the Masters of the Universe (franchise):
  - He-Man and the Masters of the Universe (1983–1985, animated)
  - She-Ra: Princess of Power (1985–1987, animated)
  - New Adventures of He-Man, The (1990, animated)
  - He-Man and the Masters of the Universe (2002–2004, animated)
- Hero: 108 (2010–2012, US/Canada/Taiwan/UK, animated)
- Hero Corp (2008–2009, France)
- Hero High (1981–1982, animated)
- Incredible Hulk, The (franchise):
  - Incredible Hulk, The (1977–1982)
  - Incredible Hulk, The (1982–1983, animated)
  - Incredible Hulk Returns, The (1988, film)
  - Trial of the Incredible Hulk, The (1989, film)
  - Death of the Incredible Hulk, The (1990, film)
  - Incredible Hulk, The a.k.a. Incredible Hulk and She-Hulk, The (1996–1997, animated)
  - Hulk and the Agents of S.M.A.S.H. (2013–2015, animated)
- Inhumans (2017)
- Iron Man (franchise):
  - Iron Man (1994–1996, animated)
  - Iron Man: Armored Adventures (2009–2012, animated)
  - Marvel Anime: Iron Man (2010, Japan, animated)
- Jake 2.0 (2003–2004)
- Justice League (franchise):
  - Justice League of America (1997, pilot, film)
  - Justice League (2001–2004, animated)
  - Justice League Unlimited (2004–2006, animated)
  - Young Justice (2010–2013, animated)
  - Justice League Action (2016–2018, animated)
- Heroes (2006–2010)
- Kamen Rider (franchise):
  - Kamen Rider (1971–1973, Japan)
  - Kamen Rider X (1974, Japan)
  - Kamen Rider Amazon (1974–1975, Japan)
  - Kamen Rider Stronger (1975, Japan)
  - Kamen Rider (Skyrider) (1979–1980, Japan)
  - Kamen Rider Super-1 (1980–1981, Japan)
  - Birth of the 10th! Kamen Riders All Together!! (1984, Japan)
  - Kamen Rider Black (1987–1988, Japan)
  - Kamen Rider Black RX (1988–1989, Japan)
  - Kamen Rider Kuuga (2000–2001, Japan)
  - Kamen Rider Agito (2001–2002, Japan)
  - Kamen Rider Ryuki (2002–2003, Japan)
  - Kamen Rider 555 (2003–2004, Japan)
  - Kamen Rider Blade (2004–2005, Japan)
  - Kamen Rider Hibiki (2005–2006, Japan)
  - Kamen Rider Kabuto (2006–2007, Japan)
  - Kamen Rider Den-O (2007–2008, Japan)
  - Kamen Rider Kiva (2008–2009, Japan)
  - Kamen Rider Decade (2009, Japan)
  - Kamen Rider G (2009, Japan, special)
  - Masked Rider (1995–1996, Kamen Rider Black RX US adaptation)
  - Kamen Rider: Dragon Knight (2009, US, adaptation)
  - Kamen Rider W a.k.a. Kamen Rider Double (2009–2010, Japan)
  - Kamen Rider OOO (2010–2011, Japan)
- Krofft Supershow, The (1976–1978) (franchise):
  - Electra Woman and Dyna Girl (1976–1977)
- Kong: The Animated Series (2000–2001, animated) (elements of science fiction)
- Kyle XY (2006–2009)
- League of Super Evil a.k.a. L.O.S.E. (2009–2012, Canada, animated)
- Legacy of the Silver Shadow (2002, Australia) Legacy of the Silver Shadow IMDb
- Legends of the Superheroes (1979)
- Legends of Tomorrow (2016–2022)
- Legion of Super Heroes (2006–2008, animated)
- Magician, The a.k.a. Magicien, Le (1997–1998, France, animated)
- Man from Atlantis (1977–1978)
- Manimal (1983)
- Manta and Moray (1979, animated, Tarzan and the Super 7 segment)
- Mighty Heroes, The (1966, animated)
- Mighty Mouse (franchise):
  - New Adventures of Mighty Mouse and Heckle & Jeckle, The (1979–1982, animated)
  - Mighty Mouse: The New Adventures (1987–1988, animated)
- Misfits (2009–2013, UK)
- Misfits of Science (1985–1986)
- Mister Terrific (1967)
- Mutant X (2001–2004)
- Needless (2009, Japan, animated)
- Nanoboy (franchise):
  - New Adventures of Nanoboy, The (2009–2010, Canada, animated) Nanoboy
  - Nanoboy: Hero on the Run (2011, Canada/US, sequel, film, animated)
- Night Man (1997–1999)
- No Ordinary Family (2010–2011)
- Now and Again (1999–2000)
- Painkiller Jane (2007)
- Planet Prince (1958, Japan)
- Phantom, The (franchise):
  - Phantom, The (2009, miniseries)
  - Phantom 2040 (1994–1996, animated)
- Plastic Man (franchise):
  - Plastic Man (2006, pilot, animated)
  - Plastic Man Comedy/Adventure Show, The (1979–1981, animated)
  - Mighty Man and Yukk (1979–1980, Plastic Man Comedy/Adventure Show, The segment, animated)
  - Rickety Rocket (1979–1980, Plastic Man Comedy/Adventure Show, The segment, animated)
- Powerpuff Girls, The (1998–2005, animated)
- Powers (2015–2016)
- Sanctuary (2008–2011, Canada)
- Sapphire & Steel (1979–1982, UK)
- Savage Dragon (1995–1996, animated) IMDb
- Secret Saturdays, The (2008–2010, animated)
- Secrets of Isis, The (1975–1977)
- Sentinel, The (1997–1999)
- Shazam! (1974–1977)
- Silver Surfer (1998, animated)
- Six Million Dollar Man, The (1974–1978)
- Something Is Out There (1988)
- Space Sentinels a.k.a. The Young Sentinels (1977, animated)
- Spider-Man (franchise):
  - Spectacular Spider-Man, The (2008–2009, animated)
  - Spider-Man (1967–1970, animated)
  - Spider-Man (1978–1979, Japan)
  - Spider-Woman (1979–1980, animated)
  - Spider-Man (1981–1982, animated)
  - Spider-Man and His Amazing Friends (1981–1983, animated)
  - Spider-man Unlimited (1999–2001, animated)
  - Spider-Man: The Animated Series (1994–1998, animated)
  - Spider-Man (2017–2020, animated)
  - Amazing Spider-Man, The (1977–1979)
  - Spider-Man: The New Animated Series (2003, animated)
  - Spidey Super Stories (1974–1977)
  - Ultimate Spider-Man (2012–2017, animated)
- Static Shock (2000–2004, animated)
- Street Fighter (franchise):
  - Street Fighter II V (1995–1996, Japan, animated)
  - Street Fighter (1995–1997, animated)
- Stripperella (2003–2004, animated) (elements of science fiction)
- Super Friends (franchise):
  - Super Friends (1973–1974, animated)
  - All-New Super Friends Hour, The (1977–1978, animated)
  - Challenge of the Super Friends (1978, animated)
  - Super Friends (1980–1982, animated)
  - Super Friends: The Legendary Super Powers Show (1984–1985, animated)
  - Super Powers Team: Galactic Guardians, The (1985–1986, animated)
  - World's Greatest Super Friends, The (1979–1980, animated)
- Super Hero Squad Show, The (2009–2011, animated)
- Supergirl (2015–2021)
- Superman (franchise):
  - Adventures of Superman (1952–1958)
  - Adventures of Superboy, The (1961, pilot)
  - New Adventures of Superman, The (1966–1970, animated)
  - Superman/Aquaman Hour of Adventure, The (1967–1968, animated)
  - Superman (1988, animated)
  - Superboy a.k.a. Adventures of Superboy, The (1988–1992)
  - Lois & Clark: The New Adventures of Superman (1993–1997)
  - Superman: The Animated Series (1996–2000, animated)
  - Smallville (2001–2011)
  - Krypto the Superdog (2005–2006, animated)
  - Superman & Lois (2021–present)
- Superstretch and Microwoman (1979, animated, Tarzan and the Super 7 segment)
- Teen Titans (franchise):
  - Teen Titans (2003–2006, animated)
  - New Teen Titans (2012, animated)
  - Teen Titans Go! (2013–present, animated)
  - Titans (2018–2023)
- Teenage Mutant Ninja Turtles a.k.a. TMNT (franchise):
  - Teenage Mutant Ninja Turtles (1987–1996, US/Japan, animated)
  - Ninja Turtles: The Next Mutation a.k.a. NT:TNM (1997–1998)
  - Teenage Mutant Ninja Turtles (2003–2009, animated):
  - Teenage Mutant Ninja Turtles: Turtles Forever a.k.a. TMNT: Turtles Forever (2009, animated film)
  - Teenage Mutant Ninja Turtles (2012–2017, animated)
  - Rise of the Teenage Mutant Ninja Turtles (2018–2020, animated)
- ThunderCats (franchise):
  - ThunderCats (1985–1990, animated)
  - ThunderCats (2011–2012, US/Japan, animated)
- Tick, The (franchise):
  - Tick, The a.k.a. Tick: The Animated Series, The (1994–1996, animated) (elements of science fiction in some episodes)
  - Tick, The (2001–2002) (elements of science fiction)
- Tomorrow People, The (franchise):
  - Tomorrow People, The (1973–1979, UK)
  - Tomorrow People, The (1992–1995, UK)
  - Tomorrow People, The (2013–2014)
- Ultraforce (1995, animated)
- Web Woman (1978–1980, animated, Tarzan and the Super 7 segment)
- Wild C.A.T.s (1994–1996, animated)
- Wonder Woman (franchise):
  - Wonder Woman (2011, pilot) IMDb
  - Wonder Woman (1975–1979)
  - Wonder Woman (1974, film, pilot) IMDb
  - Who's Afraid of Diana Prince? (1967) IMDb
- X-Men (franchise):
  - X-Men: Pryde of the X-Men (1989, animated, pilot)
  - X-Men a.k.a. X-Men: The Animated Series (1992–1997, animated)
  - X-Men: Evolution (2000–2003, animated)
  - Wolverine and the X-Men (2008–2009, animated)
  - Marvel Anime: Wolverine (2011, Japan, animated)
  - Marvel Anime: X-Men (2011, Japan, animated)
- Zetman (2012, Japan, animated)
- Zevo-3 (2010–2011, animated)

=== Time travel ===
- List of time travel science fiction: Television series
- 12:01 PM (franchise):
  - 12:01 (1993, film)
  - 12:01 PM (1990, film)
- 12 Monkeys (2015–2018)
- Aventuras En El Tiempo a.k.a. Adventures in Time (2001, Mexico)
- Back to the Future: The Animated Series (1991–1992, animated)
- Being Erica (2009–2011, Canada)
- Best Friends Whenever (2015-2016)
- Bill & Ted's Excellent Adventures (1990–1991, animated)
- Continuum (2012–2015, Canada)
- Crime Traveller (1997, UK)
- Day Break (2006–2008)
- Delilah and Julius (2005–2008, Canada, animated, elements of science fiction)
- Do Over (2002)
- Doctor Who (franchise):
  - Doctor Who (1963–1989, 1996, 2005–present, UK)
  - K-9 and Company (1981, UK, Doctor Who spin-off, pilot)
  - A Fix with Sontarans (1985, UK, segment)
  - Dimensions in Time (1993, UK, special, crossover)
  - P.R.O.B.E. (1994–1996, UK, Doctor Who spin-offs, films):
    - Zero Imperative, The (1994, UK, Doctor Who spin-off, film)
    - Devil of Winterborne, The (1995, UK, Doctor Who spin-off, film)
    - Unnatural Selection (1996, UK, Doctor Who spin-off, film)
    - Ghosts of Winterborne (1996, UK, Doctor Who spin-off, film)
  - Doctor Who and the Curse of Fatal Death a.k.a. The Curse of Fatal Death (1999, UK, special)
  - Doctor Who: Children in Need a.k.a. Born Again (2005, UK, special)
  - Attack of the Graske (2005, UK, interactive mini-episode)
  - Torchwood (2006–2011, UK, Doctor Who spin-off):
    - Torchwood: Children of Earth (2009, miniseries, third season)
    - Torchwood: Miracle Day (2011, fourth season)
  - Totally Doctor Who (2006–2007, UK)
  - Sarah Jane Adventures, The (2007–2011, UK, Doctor Who spin-off)
  - Time Crash (2007, UK, mini-episode)
  - Doctor Who: The Infinite Quest (2007, UK, animated)
  - Music of the Spheres (2009, UK, mini-episode)
  - Doctor Who: Tonight's the Night (2009, UK, special)
  - Doctor Who: Dreamland (2009, UK, animated)
  - K-9 (2009–2010, UK/Australia, Doctor Who spin-off)
- Doraemon (franchise):
  - Doraemon (1973, Japan, animated)
  - Doraemon (1979–2005, Japan, animated)
  - Doraemon (2005–present, Japan, animated)
- El ministerio del tiempo (2015–2020, Spain)
- Fantastic Journey, The (1977, US)
- Freaky (2003, New Zealand)
- Frequency (2016–2017)
- Girl from Tomorrow, The (franchise):
  - Girl from Tomorrow, The (1992, Australia)
  - Girl from Tomorrow Part II: Tomorrow's End, The (1993, Australia)
- Goodnight Sweetheart (1993–1999, UK)
- Hindsight (2015)
- Journeyman (2007)
- Kappatoo (1990, UK)
- Land of the Lost (franchise):
  - Land of the Lost (1974–1976)
  - Land of the Lost (1991–1992, Land of the Lost remake)
- Life on Mars (franchise):
  - Life on Mars (2006–2007, UK)
  - Life on Mars (2008–2009, US, Life on Mars remake)
  - Ashes to Ashes (2008–2010, UK, Life on Mars sequel)
  - Chica de Ayer, La a.k.a. Girl from Yesterday, The (2009, Spain, Life on Mars remake)
- Lost (2004–2010)
- Lost Saucer, The (1975–1976)
- Mirai Sentai Timeranger (2000–2001, Japan)
- Mirror, Mirror (franchise):
  - Mirror, Mirror (1995, Australia/New Zealand)
  - Mirror, Mirror II (1997–1998, Australia/New Zealand, Mirror, Mirror sequel)
- Now and Then, Here and There (1999–2000, Japan, animated)
- Outer Limits, The (anthology) (franchise):
  - Outer Limits, The (1963–1965, anthology)
  - Outer Limits, The (1995–2002, anthology)
- Odyssey 5 (2002, Canada)
- Outlander (2014–present, UK/USA)
- Primeval (franchise):
  - Primeval (2007–2011, UK)
  - Primeval: New World (2012–2013, Canada/UK, Primeval spin-off)
- Phil of the Future (2004–2006)
- Quantum Leap (franchise):
  - Quantum Leap (1989–1993)
  - Quantum Leap (2022)
- Rescapés, Les a.k.a. Survivors, The (2010, Canada)
- Samurai Jack (2001–2004, animated)
- Sapphire & Steel (1979–1982, UK)
- Secrets of Sulphur Springs (2021–present)
- Seven Days (1998–2001)
- Terminator: The Sarah Connor Chronicles (2008–2009)
- Terra Nova (2011)
- Time After Time (2017)
- Time Bokan (franchise):
  - Time Bokan (1975–1976, Japan, animated)
  - Yatterman (1975–1979, Japan, animated, spin-off)
  - Zenderman (1979–1980, Japan, animated)
  - Rescueman (1980–1981, Japan, animated)
  - Yattodetaman (1981–1982, Japan, animated)
  - Gyakuten! Ippatsuman (1982–1983, Japan, animated)
  - Itadakiman (1982–1983, Japan, animated)
  - Time Bokan 2000: Kaitou Kiramekiman (2000, Japan, animated)
  - Yatterman (2008–2009, Japan, animated, remake)
- Time Express (1979) (elements of science fiction)
- Time Trax (1993–1994)
- Time Tunnel, The (franchise):
  - Time Tunnel, The (1966–1967)
  - Time Travelers (1976, remake, pilot, film)
  - Time Tunnel, The (2002, pilot)
- Time Warp Trio (2005–2006, animated)
- Timecop (1997–1998)
- Timeless (2016–2018)
- Timeslip (1970, UK)
- Tru Calling (2003–2005) (elements of science fiction)
- Twilight Zone, The (anthology) (franchise):
  - Twilight Zone, The (1959–1964, anthology)
  - Twilight Zone, The (1985–1989, anthology)
  - Twilight Zone, The (2002, anthology)
- Time Jam: Valerian & Laureline (2007–2008, France/Japan, animated)
- Travelers (2016–2018, Canada)
- Voyagers! (1982–1983)
- Walking with... a.k.a. Trilogy of Life a.k.a. Walking with Prehistoric Life (UK, docufiction) (franchise):
  - Prehistoric Park (2006, UK, miniseries, docufiction)
  - Walking with Monsters (2005, UK, film series, docufiction)
  - Walking with Cavemen (2003, UK, miniseries, docufiction)
  - Sea Monsters – A Walking with Dinosaurs Trilogy (2003, UK, miniseries, docufiction)
  - Chased by Dinosaurs (2002, UK, miniseries, docufiction)
  - Walking with Beasts (2001, UK, miniseries, docufiction)
  - Ballad of Big Al, The a.k.a. Allosaurus: a Walking with Dinosaurs Special (2001, UK, miniseries, docufiction)
  - Walking with Dinosaurs (1999, UK, miniseries, docufiction)

=== Vehicle-based ===
- Flying car (fiction): Science fiction
- List of fictional automobiles: Television and radio
- List of fictional automobiles: Graphic novels, comics & animation
- List of fictional vehicles: Television
- Twenty Thousand Leagues Under the Seas (franchise):
  - Undersea Adventures of Captain Nemo, The (1975, Canada, animated)
  - 20,000 Leagues Under the Sea (1985, Australia, film, animated)
  - 20,000 Leagues Under the Sea (1997, Hallmark, film)
  - 20,000 Leagues Under the Sea (1997, Village Roadshow, film)
  - Return of Captain Nemo, The (television) a.k.a. Amazing Captain Nemo, The (theatrical film) (1978, miniseries)
  - 20,000 Leagues Under the Sea (2002, film, animated) IMDb
- Airwolf (1984–1987)
- Ark II (1976)
- Blue Thunder (1984)
- Galaxy Railways, The (franchise):
  - Galaxy Railways, The (2003–2004, Japan, animated)
  - Galaxy Railways: Crossroads to Eternity, The (2006–2007, Japan, animated)
- Hot Wheels (franchise):
  - Hot Wheels AcceleRacers (2005, animated)
  - Hot Wheels Battle Force 5 a.k.a. Battle Force 5 (UK/Ireland) (2009–2011, animated)
- Knight Rider (franchise):
  - Knight Rider (1982–1986)
  - Knight Rider 2000 (1991, film)
  - Knight Rider 2010 (1994, film)
  - Team Knight Rider (1997–1998, Knight Rider 1982 spin-off)
  - Knight Rider (2008, pilot, film)
  - Knight Rider (2008–2009)
- Man from Atlantis (1977–1978)
- Now and Then, Here and There (1999–2000, Japan, animated)
- seaQuest DSV renamed seaQuest 2032 for third season (1993–1996)
- Secret of Cerulean Sand (2002, Japan, animated)
- Stingray (1964–1965, UK, puppetry)
- Storm Hawks (2007–2009, Canada, animated)
- Street Hawk (1985)
- Supercar (1961–1962, puppetry)
- Thunderbirds (1965–1966, UK, puppetry)
- Viper (1994–1999)
- Voyage to the Bottom of the Sea (1964–1968)

=== Virtual reality ===
- Augmented reality: Television & film
- Virtual reality: Television
- Caprica (2010–2011)
- Code Lyoko (franchise):
  - Garage Kids (2001, France/US, Code Lyoko pilot, animated)
  - Code Lyoko (2003–2007, France, animated)
  - Code Lyoko: Evolution (2012–2013, France, partly animated)
- Doctor Who (1963–1989, 1996, 2005–present, UK) (few episodes)
- Firefly (2002–2003) (few episodes)
- .hack (franchise):
  - .hack//Sign (2002, Japan, animated)
  - .hack//Legend of the Twilight (2003, Japan, animated)
  - .hack//Roots (2006, Japan, animated)
- Harsh Realm (1999–2000, Canada/US)
- Serial Experiments Lain (1998, Japan, animated)
- Star Trek: The Next Generation (1987–1994) (few episodes)
- Superjail! (2008–2014, animated)
- Tribe, The (franchise):
  - New Tomorrow, The (2006, New Zealand, Tribe, The sequel)
  - Tribe, The (1999–2003, New Zealand)
- Tron: Uprising (2012–2013, animated)
- Video Warrior Laserion (1984–1985, Japan, animated)
- Virtuality (2009, pilot, film)
- VR Troopers (1994–1996)
- VR.5 (1995)
- Welt am Draht a.k.a. World on a Wire (1973, Germany, miniseries, film)
- Wild Palms (1993, miniseries)
- Zixx (2004–2009, Canada, partly animated)
