= List of Monsters vs. Aliens characters =

Characters from the film Monsters vs. Aliens and its spin-offs.

== Monsters ==
Each of the main five characters are modeled after classic movie monsters.

- Susan Murphy (voiced by Reese Witherspoon in the film and special, and Riki Lindhome in the TV series), also known as Ginormica, is a normal woman who was hit by a radioactive meteorite containing Quantonium on her wedding day, transforming her into a white-haired giantess who stands just over 50 feet. In addition to her size, she is particularly strong, durable, and resistant to energy attacks. Susan is inspired by the protagonist of Attack of the 50-Foot Woman. In the television series, she gained the ability to switch between her giant and normal sizes at will.
- B.O.B. (Benzoate Ostylezene Bicarbonate) (voiced by Seth Rogen in the film, Chip 'n Dale: Rescue Rangers and specials, Dave B. Mitchell in Madagascar Kartz and Eric Edelstein in the TV series) is an indestructible gelatinous mass. He was created when a genetically altered tomato was injected with a chemically altered ranch dessert topping, with the resulting goo gaining consciousness. Despite being sentient, he literally and figuratively lacks a brain, and is the main comic relief character. His greatest strength lies in his ability to digest any substance. He is inspired by The Blob and The Crawling Eye.
- Dr. Herbert Cockroach, Ph.D. (voiced by Hugh Laurie in the film, B.O.B.'s Big Break and Mutant Pumpkins from Outer Space, James Horan in Night of the Living Carrots and video game and Chris O'Dowd in the TV series) is a brilliant but mad scientist who built a pod-like invention to give humans the survival abilities of a cockroach, experimenting on himself. Cockroach gained a cockroach-like head, the ability to climb up walls, and increased durability. He is inspired by The Fly and The Curse of Frankenstein.
- The Missing Link (voiced by Will Arnett in the film, video game, B.O.B.'s Big Break, and Mutant Pumpkins from Outer Space, David Kaye in Night of the Living Carrots and Diedrich Bader in the TV series) is a 20,000-year-old fish-ape hybrid who was found frozen and thawed out, only to escape and wreak havoc at his old lagoon habitat. He behaves as a macho jock most of the time, but is out of shape. He is an expert martial-artist and leads the team in attacks. According to director Conrad Vernon, although Link bears an obvious resemblance to Creature from the Black Lagoon, “Link really just represents anything prehistoric that comes back to life and terrorizes people".
- Insectosaurus (often referred to as "Insecto") is a silkworm who was transformed by nuclear radiation into a 350 foot (106.7 m) tall monster with the ability to shoot silk out of her nose. Insectosaurus cannot speak clearly, and is mesmerized by bright lights (usually used to lead her to other locations). Near the end of the film, Insectosaurus undergoes metamorphosis and turns into a winged, butterfly-like form dubbed Butterflyosaurus. For the longest time, Link thought Insectosaurus was a male, but after her emergence from a cocoon, it was discovered she was actually a female. Her characteristics are similar to the giant creature in The Angry Red Planet, and Mothra.
- An adaptation of Griffin (The Invisible Man), from The Invisible Man by H.G. Wells, is mentioned in the film has having died of a heart attack twenty-five years earlier. He has a brief cameo in the ending of B.O.B.'s Big Break, voiced by Mike Mitchell.
- The Man-Beast is a werewolf who was originally meant to join Team Monster, but was rejected.

== Aliens ==
- Gallaxhar (voiced by Rainn Wilson) is an evil alien overlord who intends to take over Earth.
- Gallaxhar's Computer (voiced by Amy Poehler) is a user-friendly computer that follows his orders.
- Artificially intelligent robots onboard Gallaxhar's ship sent to Earth after the Quantonium was detected.
- The Mutant Pumpkins are the antagonists of Mutant Pumpkins from Outer Space. They were created by an unknown alien who saturated Farmer Jeb's pumpkin patch with a mutagenic substance.
- The Zombie Carrots are the antagonists of Night of the Living Carrots. They were created when Link scares a surviving pumpkin that was standing over a carrot patch, causing a carrot to absorb the same green goo that mutated the pumpkins.
- Sqweep's Teacher is a minor character seen on a few episodes.
- Pip is Sqweep's financial planner, working for Epsilon-11 Allowance Management. He is the same species as Sqweep and resembles her, but is dark blue.
- Cuddle Bear is an aggressive plushy that appears in "The Toy from Another World".
- Leprechaun is a Leprechonian, an alien with the ability to grant good luck. It was originally believed by Monger, Coverton, and the other monsters to be classified as a monster.
- The Internet is an alien who is literally the Internet.
- Coverton (voiced by Jeff Bennett) is a psychokinetic alien who is the main antagonist of the TV series. He is the team leader of Team Alien.
- Coverlord (or Grand Coverlord) is the true main antagonist of the television series, who wishes to take over Earth. He sends Coverton to Earth. Coverlord is seen as a mute, faceless, green cloud.
- Sqweep (voiced by Haley Tju) is a 10-year-old alien who has come to Earth to write a report on Earth's dominant species for school. Her antennae glow based on her emotions, red for anger/frustration/stress, yellow for fear/concern, green for happiness/excitement, and purple for sadness/depression/carelessness.
- Sta'abi (voiced by Gillian Jacobs) is a hotheaded female alien from a warrior/hunting culture and Link's love interest. Highly aggressive and quick to take matters into her own hands, she is offended by apologies and answers best to aggression.
- Vornicarn is an animalistic alien who briefly incubated inside Link's nose before emerging. He rampaged around Area Fifty-Something until Sta'abi captured and tamed him to be her companion.

== Space Monsters and the unidentifiable ==
- When the monsters are watching a horror film called Attack of the Zombie Moon Ape, Sqweep watches it in secret to gain extra credit. Becoming sleep-deprived because of it, Sqweep invents a memory extractor to extract the memory of the Moon Ape, which escapes into reality.
- A smartphone Dr. Cockroach brings to life and adopts as his own son.

== Robots ==
Robot characters Aero Tank and Unstoppabot appear in some episodes.

== Humans ==
- General Warren R. Monger (voiced by Kiefer Sutherland in the film, Fred Tatasciore in the video game and Kevin Michael Richardson in the TV series) is a military leader who runs a top secret facility where monsters are kept. He plans to fight the invading aliens with the imprisoned monsters.
- President Hathaway (voiced by Stephen Colbert in the film and James Patrick Stuart in the TV series) is the impulsive and dimwitted President of the United States. He does not appear in Monsters vs. Aliens: Mutant Pumpkins from Outer Space, but is seen on a picture frame holding an astronaut helmet.
- Derek Dietl (voiced by Paul Rudd in the film and Nolan North in the TV series) is a weatherman and Susan's ex-fiancé. He jumps at whatever opportunity he has to boost his career.
- Carl Murphy (voiced by Jeffrey Tambor) is Susan's father.
- Wendy Murphy (voiced by Julie White) is Susan's mother.
