= List of science fiction television programs, M =

This is an inclusive list of science fiction television programs whose names begin with the letter M.

== M ==
Live-action:

- M.A.N.T.I.S. (1994–1995)
- Maddigan's Quest (2006, New Zealand)
- Man and the Challenge, The (1959–1960)
- Man in the High Castle, The (2015–2019)
- Man from Atlantis (1977–1978)
- Man from U.N.C.L.E., The (1964–1968) (elements of science fiction)
- Man Who Fell to Earth, The (1987, pilot)
- Mandog (1972, UK) IMDb
- Mandrake the Magician (1954, pilot)
- Manimal (1983)
- Mann & Machine (1992)
- Mars (2016–2018)
- Martian Chronicles, The (1980, miniseries)
- Marvin Marvin (2012–2013)
- Masters of Science Fiction (2007, anthology)
- Matthew Blackheart: Monster Smasher (2002, film) IMDb
- Max Headroom (franchise):
  - Max Headroom: 20 Minutes into the Future (1985, UK, film)
  - Max Headroom (1987–1988)
- Mech-X4 (2016–2018)
- Meego (1997)
- Memories of the Alhambra (2018-2019, South Korea)
- Men into Space (1959–1960)
- Mentors (1998–2002) IMDb
- Mercy Point (1998–1999)
- Metal Hero' (Japan)
- Métal Hurlant Chronicles (2012–2014, France/Belgium, anthology)
- Metal Mickey (1980–1983, UK)
- Middleman, The (2008)
- Mighty Boosh, The (2004–2007, UK) (elements of science fiction in some episodes)
- Mighty Jack (1968, Japan)
- Mighty Med (2013–2015)
- Mike and Angelo (1989–2000, UK)
- Mind Beyond, The (1975)
- Minority Report (2015)
- Miracles (2003)
- Miraculous Mellops, The (1991)
- Mirai Sentai Timeranger (2000–2001, Japan)*
- Mirror, Mirror (franchise):
  - Mirror, Mirror (1995, Australia/New Zealand)
  - Mirror, Mirror II (1997–1998, Australia/New Zealand, Mirror, Mirror sequel)
- Misfits (2009–2013, UK)
- Misfits of Science (1985–1986)
- Mission Genesis (US) a.k.a. Deepwater Black (UK/Canada) (1997)
- Missions (2017–present, France)
- Mission Terra (1985-1988, Germany)
- Mister Terrific (1967)
- Monsters (1988)
- Moonbase 3 (1973, UK)
- Moonhaven (2022)
- Mork & Mindy (1978–1982)
- Mortal Kombat (franchise):
  - Mortal Kombat: Konquest a.k.a. Mortal Kombat: Conquest (1998–1999)
- Mr. Squiggle (1959–1999, Australia, puppetry)
- Mr. Zed Show, The (1994) IMDb
- Murder and the Android (1959, film)
- Mutant X (2001–2004)
- My Favorite Martian (1963–1966)
- My Hero (2000–2006, UK)
- My Living Doll (1964–1965)
- My Own Worst Enemy (2008)
- My Parents Are Aliens (1999–2006, UK)
- My Secret Identity (1988–1991, Canada)
- Mysterious Doctor Satan (1940)
- Mysterious Island (franchise):
  - Mysterious Island, The a.k.a. La isla misteriosa y el capitán Nemo (1973, Spain, miniseries)
  - Mysterious Island (1995)
  - Mysterious Island (2005, film)
- Mysterious Ways (2002–2004)
- Mystery Science Theater 3000 a.k.a. MST3K (1988–1999)
- MythQuest (elements of science fiction)

Animation

- M.A.S.K. (1985–1986, animated)
- Machine Robo (franchise)
  - Machine Robo: Revenge of Cronos (1986–1987, Japan, animated)
  - Machine Robo: Battle Hackers (1987, Japan, animated)
  - Machine Robo Rescue (2003–2004, Japan, animated)
- Macross (franchise):
  - Super Dimension Fortress Macross, The (1982–1983, Japan, animated)
  - Super Dimension Cavalry Southern Cross (1984, Japan, animated)
  - Super Dimension Century Orguss (1983–1984, Japan, animated)
  - Macross 7 (1994–1995, Japan, animated)
  - Macross Frontier (2008, Japan, animated)
  - Macross Delta (2016, Japan, animated)
- Magician, The a.k.a. Magicien, Le (1997–1998, France, animated)
- Magne Robo Gakeen (1976–1977, Japan, animated)
- Mahoromatic (franchise):
  - Mahoromatic: Automatic Maiden (2001–2002, Japan, animated)
  - Mahoromatic: Something More Beautiful (2002–2003, Japan, animated)
- Manta and Moray (1979, animated, Tarzan and the Super 7 segment)
- Marine Boy a.k.a. Undersea Boy Marine (franchise):
  - Dolphin Prince (1966, Japan, animated)
  - Hang On! Marine Kid (1969, Japan, animated)
  - Undersea Boy Marine (1969–1971, Japan, animated)
- Mario (franchise):
  - Saturday Supercade: Space Ace (1984, segment, animated)
  - Super Mario Bros. Super Show!, The (1989, animated)
  - Captain N: The Game Master (1989–1991, animated)
  - Adventures of Super Mario Bros. 3, The (1990, animated)
  - Super Mario World (1991, animated)
- Mars Daybreak (2004, Japan, animated)
- Martin Mystery (2003–2006, Italy/France/Canada, animated) (elements of science fiction)
- Mary Shelley's Frankenhole (2010–2012, animated) (elements of science fiction)
- Max Steel (franchise):
  - Max Steel (2013–2016, animated)
  - Max Steel (2000–2002, animated)
- Mazinger (franchise):
  - Mazinger Z (1972–1974, Japan, animated) a.k.a. Tranzor Z (US)
  - Great Mazinger (1974–1975, Japan, animated)
  - Grendizer (1975–1977, Japan, animated)
  - God Mazinger (1984, Japan, animated)
  - Shin Mazinger Shougeki! Z Hen (2009, Japan, animated)
- Mechander Robo (1977, Japan, animated)
- Medabots a.k.a. Medarot (1999–2001, Japan, animated)
- Mega Man (US) a.k.a. Rockman (Japan) (franchise):
  - Mega Man a.k.a. Mega Man: A Rockman series (1994–1995, Japan/US, animated)
  - MegaMan NT Warrior a.k.a. Mega Man Battle Network a.k.a. Rockman.EXE (2002–2003, Japan, animated)
  - MegaMan NT Warrior Axess a.k.a. Rockman.EXE Axess (2003–2004, Japan, animated)
  - MegaMan NT Warrior Stream a.k.a. Rockman.EXE Stream (2004–2005, Japan, animated)
  - MegaMan NT Warrior Beast a.k.a. Rockman.EXE Beast (2005–2006, Japan, animated)
  - MegaMan NT Warrior Beast+ a.k.a. Rockman.EXE Beast+ (2006, Japan, animated)
  - Mega Man Star Force a.k.a. Shooting Star Rockman (2006–2007, Japan, animated)
  - Mega Man Star Force Tribe a.k.a. Shooting Star Rockman Tribe (2007–2008, Japan, animated)
- Megas XLR (2004–2005, animated)
- Men in Black: The Series a.k.a. Men in Black: The Animated Series a.k.a. MIB: The Series (1997–2001, animated)
- MetaJets (2008–2010, South Korea/Canada, animated)
- Metal Armor Dragonar (1987–1988, Japan, animated)
- Metal Fighter Miku (1994, Japan, animated)
- Mighty Ducks (1996–1997, animated)
- Mighty Heroes, The (1966, animated)
- Mighty Max (1993–1994, animated)
- Mighty Mouse (franchise):
  - New Adventures of Mighty Mouse and Heckle & Jeckle, The (1979–1982, animated)
  - Mighty Mouse: The New Adventures (1987–1988, animated)
- Miles from Tomorrowland (2015, animated)
- Mirai Robo Daltanious (1979–1980, Japan, animated)
- Monster Force (1994, animated) (elements of science fiction)
- Monsters vs. Aliens (franchise):
  - B.O.B.'s Big Break (2009, Monsters vs. Aliens spin-off, short film, animated)
  - Monsters vs. Aliens: Mutant Pumpkins from Outer Space (2009, Monsters vs. Aliens spin-off, special, animated)
  - Night of the Living Carrots (2011, Monsters vs. Aliens spin-off, Monsters vs. Aliens: Mutant Pumpkins from Outer Space sequel, special, animated)
  - Monsters vs. Aliens a.k.a. MvA (2013–2014, Monsters vs. Aliens spin-off, animated)
- Moonlight Mask (franchise):
  - Moonlight Mask (1958–1959, Japan)
  - Seigi wo Ai Suru Mono – Gekko- Kamen a.k.a. The One Who Loves Justice: Moonlight Mask (1972, Japan, animated)
  - We Know You, Moonlight Mask-kun! (1999–2000, Japan, animated)
- Moonlight Mile (2007, Japan, animated)
  - Mortal Kombat: Defenders of the Realm (1996, animated)
- Motorcity (2012, animated)
- Muteking, The Dashing Warrior (1980–1981, Japan, animated)
- My Dad the Bounty Hunter (2023, animated)
- My Favorite Martians (1973–1975, animated)
- My Goldfish Is Evil (2006–2008, Canada, animated)
- My Life as a Teenage Robot (2002–2006, animated)
- Mysterious Cities of Gold, The (1982–1983, animated)
