= Monsters vs. Aliens (disambiguation) =

Monsters vs. Aliens is a 2009 American animated science fiction action-comedy film.

Monsters vs. Aliens may also refer to:

- Monsters vs. Aliens (franchise), an animated media franchise
- Monsters vs. Aliens (video game), a 2009 cooperative video game
- Monsters vs. Aliens (TV series), a TV series sequel to the film
- Monsters vs. Aliens (soundtrack), soundtrack of the same name of the film
