= MVA =

MVA may refer to:

== Arts and entertainment ==
- Monsters vs. Aliens (franchise)
  - Monsters vs. Aliens, a 2009 animated film
  - Monsters vs. Aliens: MvA, a 2013–2014 television series sequel to the film
- Music Video Awards, presented by the cable channel MTV
- MX vs. ATV, a crossover racing video game series

== Businesses ==
- MVA in Asia, a global consultancy firm
- Mississippi Valley Airlines, a defunct US airline

== Economics and finance ==
- Margin Valuation Adjustment, one of the X-Value Adjustments in relation to derivative instruments held by banks
- Market Value Accounting, an alternative accounting method used by banks
- Market value added, an economic metric
- Market Value Appraiser, in real estate
- Market value assessment, used in property taxation
- Merverdiavgift, a Norwegian Value Added Tax (VAT)

== Mathematics ==
- Mean value analysis, a solution technique for separable closed queueing networks
- Multivariate analysis, a collection of procedures that involve observation and analysis of more than one statistical variable at a time

== Science and technology ==
=== Biology and medicine ===
- Malignant ventricular arrhythmia, a heart problem
- Manual vacuum aspiration, a method of abortion that consists of removing the embryo by suction
- Mevalonic acid, an important compound in molecular biology
- Mimotope Variation Analysis, an immunoprofiling technology
- Mitral valve area
- Modified vaccinia Ankara, a virus modified to carry vaccines

=== Computing and telecommunications ===
- Microsoft Virtual Academy, a free online training area for Microsoft technologies
- Model–view–adapter, a framework for creating computer user interfaces
- Multi-domain Vertical Alignment, an LCD technology

=== Other uses in science and technology ===
- Megavolt-ampere, a unit of measure of apparent power
- Minimum Vectoring Altitude, the lowest altitude Air Traffic Control will typically use for radar vectoring of aircraft

== Other uses ==
- Maha Vikas Aghadi, a political party alliance in Maharashtra, India
- Motor vehicle accident, or multi-vehicle accident
- Motor Vehicle Administration, in Maryland
- Motor Voter Act, an alternative name for the National Voter Registration Act of 1993
