= Presentation–abstraction–control =

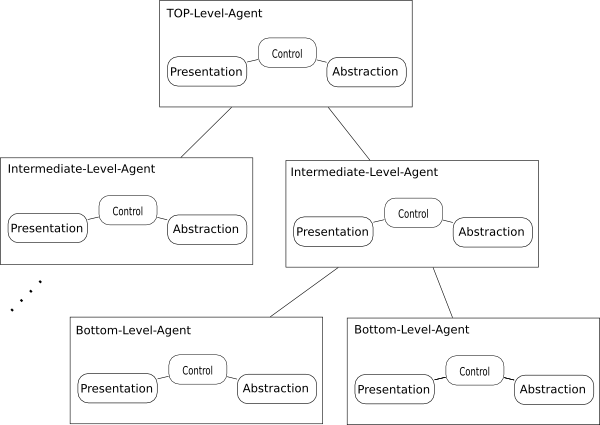
The structure of an application with PAC.

Presentation–abstraction–control (PAC) is a software architectural pattern. It is an interaction-oriented software architecture, and is somewhat similar to model–view–controller (MVC) in that it separates an interactive system into three types of components responsible for specific aspects of the application's functionality. The abstraction component retrieves and processes the data, the presentation component formats the visual and audio presentation of data, and the control component handles things such as the flow of control and communication between the other two components.

In contrast to MVC, PAC is used as a hierarchical structure of agents, each consisting of a triad of presentation, abstraction and control parts. The agents (or triads) communicate with each other only through the control part of each triad. It also differs from MVC in that within each triad, it completely insulates the presentation (view in MVC) and the abstraction (model in MVC). This provides the option to separately multithread the model and view which can give the user experience of very short program start times, as the user interface (presentation) can be shown before the abstraction has fully initialized.

== History ==
PAC was initially developed by French computer scientist, Joëlle Coutaz in 1987. Coutaz founded the User Interface group at the Laboratoire de Génie Informatique of IMAG.

== See also ==
- Action Domain Responder
- Hierarchical model–view–controller
- Model–view–presenter
- Model–view–viewmodel
- Presenter First
- PAC-Amodeus
