= ADR =

ADR or adr may refer to:

== Aviation ==
- Accident data recorder, or flight data recorder
- Adria Airways, an airline of Slovenia
- Aeroporti di Roma, an Italian fixed-base operator of Rome Fiumicino Airport and Rome Ciampino Airport
- Robert F. Swinnie Airport in Andrews, South Carolina, US (IATA airport code ADR)

== Companies ==
- Applied Data Research, a large software vendor from the 1960s until the mid-1980s

== Computing ==
- Action–domain–responder architectural pattern
- The adr microformat, part of the hCard microformat
- Advanced Digital Recording, a magnetic tape data storage format
- Architectural decision record
- Asynchronous DRAM refresh, an approach for persistent memory found in some Intel Xeon processors

== Entertainment ==
- Alter Der Ruine, an American powernoise music group
- Automated dialogue replacement, a post-production process in filmmaking

== Law and finance ==
- Alternative dispute resolution
- American depositary receipt, a method of trading non-U.S. stocks on U.S. exchanges
- Average daily rate, a common lodging industry statistic

== Science and medicine ==
- Adiabatic demagnetization refrigeration
- Adrenodoxin-NADP+ reductase, an enzyme
- Adverse drug reaction
- Artificial disc replacement, a surgical procedure
- Astra Digital Radio, a digital radio transmission system

== Transportation ==
- Active debris removal, an action or policy for enhancing space transport safety
- ADR (treaty), governing transport of hazardous materials
- Airdrie railway station, UK
- Ardeer railway station, Melbourne

== Sports ==
- AD Renting (cycling team), a Belgian professional cycling team that existed from 1987 to 1989
- Alan Docking Racing, British motor racing team
- Alberto Del Rio (born 1977), Mexican professional wrestler
- Alice Davidson-Richards (born 1994), English cricketer

== Other uses ==
- Académie de Roberval, a school in Montreal, Quebec, Canada
- Adonara language, a Central Malayo-Polynesian language of Indonesia
- ADR rose, a rose trial winner
- Alternative Democratic Reform Party, a political party in Luxembourg
- Australian Design Rules, a set of construction standards for road registered vehicles in Australia
- Automated Demand response (Auto-DR), the automation by electric grid utilities to curtail load for various cost savings strategies
- Automotive dead reckoning, GNSS-assisted dead reckoning for vehicles
- Axiom of real determinacy
- Azerbaijan Democratic Republic (1918–1920), a precursor state to modern Azerbaijan
- Automated dialogue replacement, process in film editing, see Dubbing#ADR/post-sync/over-dubbing
