= Telman Adigozalov =

Azerbaijani actor

Telman Adıgözəlov
- Born: Telman Abbasqulu oğlu Adıgözəlov; July 17, 1953; Balakan Rayon, Azerbaijani SSR
- Died: April 15, 2010 (aged 56); Baku, Azerbaijan
- Education: Azerbaijan State University of Culture and Arts
- Occupations: Actor, director, T.V. presenter
- Years active: 1974–2010

Telman Abbasgulu oglu Adigozalov (Azerbaijani: Telman Adıgözəlov; 17 July 1953, Balakan Rayon – 15 April 2010, Baku) was an Azerbaijani film, television, and theatre actor, TV presenter, People Artist of Azerbaijan (2006).

== Early life ==
Telman Adigozalov was born on July 17, 1953, in the Balakan region of Azerbaijan. He graduated from the School of Drama and Cinema of Azerbaijan State Art Institute and was working for the Azerbaijan National Drama Theater.

== Contributions ==
He is mostly remembered for vivid roles in many performances, such as in Hurshudbanu Natavan, The Song Remained in the Mountains, Macbeth, The Devil, Vagif and Oh, Paris, Paris....

He also appeared in several television productions, including The man in green eyeshades, Ordan-Burdan, Neighbours, in the movies Nasimi, Face to the Wind and I grew up on the beach.

== Honours ==
Adigozalov was awarded the titles of Honorable Artist of Azerbaijan in 2000 and Azerbaijan People's Artist in 2006.

== See also ==
- Jeyhun Mirzayev
