= Bistro Framework =

Compositional .NET MVC framework

Bistro Framework is a compositional .NET MVC framework with concepts from REST and AOP. Bistro modifies the traditional concepts of MVC by breaking down a single HTTP request into a series of aspects, each processed by a separate controller. Individual controllers are bound to aspects of a URI, and may service multiple disparate HTTP requests. This forces each controller to be entirely agnostic of the specific of an HTTP request, focusing only on the functionality that is responsible for.

This focus simplifies implementations of controllers using functional languages, as it minimizes side-effects within controllers. The current version of bistro supports controllers written using the F# programming language.

Bistro Framework is published under the GNU LGPL.
