= Hierarchical model–view–controller =

Software design pattern

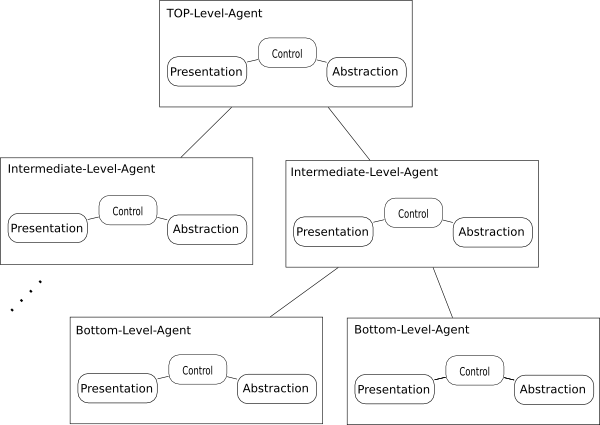
The structure of an application with PAC.

Hierarchical model–view–controller (HMVC) is a software architectural pattern, a variation of model–view–controller (MVC) similar to presentation–abstraction–control (PAC), that was published in 2000 in an article in JavaWorld Magazine. The authors were apparently unaware of PAC, which was published 13 years earlier.

The controller has some oversight in that it selects first the model and then the view, realizing an approval mechanism by the controller. The model prevents the view from accessing the data source directly.

== Example ==
The largest practical benefit of using an HMVC architecture is the "widgetization" of content structures. An example might be comments, ratings, Twitter or blog RSS feed displays, or the display of shopping cart contents for an e-commerce website. It is essentially a piece of content that needs to be displayed across multiple pages, and possibly even in different places, depending on the context of the main HTTP request.

Traditional MVC frameworks generally do not provide a direct answer for these types of content structures, so programmers often end up duplicating and switching layouts, using custom helpers, creating their own widget structures or library files, or pulling in unrelated data from the main requested Controller to push through to the View and render in a partial. The downside is that the responsibility of rendering a particular piece of content or loading required data leaks into multiple areas and gets duplicated in the respective places.

HMVC, or specifically the ability to dispatch sub-requests to a Controller to handle these responsibilities aims to solve this problem. The structure mimics that of traditional MVC. For example, if one needs to load some data about comments, and display them in HTML format, one would send a request to the comments Controller with some parameters. The request then interacts with the Model, picks a View, which displays the content. The difference from a traditional MVC is that instead of displaying the comments in a fully separate page, they are displayed inline below the article the user is viewing. In this regard, HMVC strives to increase code modularity, aid reusability, and maintain a better separation of concerns.

The following is a code example demonstrating sub-requests to child controllers (widgets).

package org.wikipedia.examples;

import java.util.Arrays;
import java.util.List;

record Comment(String author, String text) {}

class CommentRepository {
    public List<Comment> findByArticleId(int articleId) {
        // Return some commments found in the article (example)
        return Arrays.asList(
            new Comment("Alice", "Great article!"),
            new Comment("Bob", "I learned a lot.")
        );
    }
}

class CommentsController {
    private final CommentRepository repository = new CommentRepository();

    public String handle(int articleId) {
        List<Comment> comments = repository.findByArticleId(articleId);
        return renderCommentsHtml(comments);
    }

    private String renderCommentsHtml(List<Comment> comments) {
        StringBuilder sb = new StringBuilder();
        sb.append("<div class='comments'>");
        for (Comment c : comments) {
            sb.append("<p><strong>")
              .append(c.getAuthor())
              .append(":</strong> ")
              .append(c.getText())
              .append("</p>");
        }
        sb.append("</div>");
        return sb.toString();
    }
}

public class ArticleController {
    private final CommentsController commentsController = new CommentsController();

    public String showArticlePage(int articleId) {
        // Main article content
        String articleHtml =
                "<h1>HMVC Demo Article</h1>" +
                "<p>This is the main article.</p>";

        String commentsWidget = commentsController.handle(articleId);
        return articleHtml + commentsWidget;
    }

    public static void main(String[] args) {
        ArticleController controller = new ArticleController();
        String html = controller.showArticlePage(42);
        System.out.println(html);
    }
}

== See also ==
- Presentation–abstraction–control (PAC)
- Model–view–controller (MVC)
