= Madagascar Kartz =

2009 video game

- Developers: Sidhe; Virtuos (DS)
- Publisher: Activision
- Series: Madagascar; Dreamworks Kartz
- Platforms: Nintendo DS, PlayStation 3, Wii, Xbox 360
- Release: NA: October 27, 2009; EU: November 6, 2009; AU: December 9, 2009 (Wii)
- Genre: Kart racing
- Modes: Single-player, multiplayer

Madagascar Kartz is a kart racing game developed by Sidhe and published by Activision. Based on DreamWorks Animation's Madagascar, It was released in 2009 for various consoles as the second game on Madagascar's spin-off series. The Nintendo DS version developed by Virtuos was re-released as a multicart that also includes Shrek's Carnival Craze Party Games.

== Gameplay ==
The game is a kart racing game, and the player can perform jumps, flips, and rolls. There are many different stages from scenes of the franchise. A Madagascar Kartz themed Wheel controller accessory was optionally bundled with the Wii version of the game.

Race types include Quick Race, Championship, Time Trial and Checkpoint race. A Championship race is one where the player collects mangoes and tries to finish first place in order to unlock higher speed classes (50cc, 100cc, 150cc, 200cc; the last one is raced in reverse direction/mirror mode), more karts and tracks. In Time Trial, players beat their own times and earn medals (gold, silver and bronze). In Checkpoint Race, players collect as many hourglasses as they can before the time runs out. There are nine tracks in the game, most of which have two shortcuts. "I Like to Move It", sung by Reel 2 Real, is the menu theme.

=== Characters ===
The game includes nine playable characters, including two guest characters from fellow DreamWorks Animation franchises Shrek and Monsters vs. Aliens.

- Alex the Lion
- B.O.B.
- The Chimps
- Gloria the Hippopotamus
- King Julien
- Marty the Zebra
- Melman the Giraffe
- The Penguins
- Shrek

== Reception ==
Reception

Aggregate score
Aggregator	Score			
Aggregator	DS	PS3	Wii	Xbox 360
Metacritic	67/100	62/100	57/100	54/100

Review scores
Publication	Score			
Publication	DS	PS3	Wii	Xbox 360
IGN	6.5/10	6.8/10	6.8/10	6.8/10
NGamer	N/A	N/A	41%	N/A
Official Xbox Magazine (US)	N/A	N/A	N/A	6/10

Madagascar Kartz received "mixed or average" reviews on all platforms according to the review aggregation website Metacritic. Nintendo Gamer gave the Wii version a score of 41%, seven months after the game's release.
