= Monsters vs. Aliens (franchise) =

DreamWorks Animation media franchise

- Logo for the first film
- Created by: Conrad Vernon; Rob Letterman
- Developed by: Maya Forbes Wally Wolodarsky Rob Letterman Jonathan Aibel Glenn Berger
- Original work: Monsters vs. Aliens (2009)
- Owners: DreamWorks Animation (Universal Pictures (Note: Paramount Pictures distributed the first film, while as part of DreamWorks Animation's distribution deals with Paramount from 2006 to 2012, The distribution rights to future Monsters vs. Aliens movies would move to Universal Studios following its acquisition by NBCUniversal in 2016; the first to be distributed by the studio was Monsters vs. Aliens 2.)) (Note: In July 2014, the film's distribution rights were purchased by DreamWorks Animation from Paramount Pictures and transferred to 20th Century Fox before reverting to Universal Pictures in 2018 following NBCUniversal's acquisition of DreamWorks Animation in 2016.)
- Years: 2009–2014

Films and television
- Film: Monsters vs. Aliens (2009)
- Short films: B.O.B.'s Big Break (2009); Monsters vs. Aliens: Mutant Pumpkins from Outer Space (2009); Night of the Living Carrots (2011)
- Animated series: Monsters vs. Aliens (2013–2014)

Games
- Video games: Monsters vs. Aliens; Madagascar Kartz; Super Star Kartz

Audio
- Soundtrack: Monsters vs. Aliens

Official website
- Monsters vs Aliens

Monsters vs. Aliens is an American media franchise of DreamWorks Animation. It began in 2009 with the release of the animated feature film of the same name, and has since grown to include two short films, a television special, a television series, and a tie-in video game.

The franchise revolves around the adventures of four anthropomorphic monsters: Susan (also called Ginormica), a woman who was struck by an asteroid on her wedding day and grew to be 50 feet tall; B.O.B., an indestructible gelatinous mass who was created when a dessert topping was crossed with a tomato; The Missing Link, a 20,000-year-old macho fish man, who was thawed out from deep ice by scientists; Dr. Cockroach, Ph.D., a scientist who merged with a roach after his experiment went wrong; and Insectosaurus, a massive bug who was mutated by nuclear radiation. The monsters are assigned by the U.S. Government to defend Earth from alien invasions and supernatural threats.

== Theatrical film ==
Monsters vs. Aliens story chronology
- Monsters vs. Aliens (2009)
- B.O.B.'s Big Break (2009)
- Monsters vs. Aliens: Mutant Pumpkins from Outer Space (2009)
- Night of the Living Carrots (2011)
- Monsters vs. Aliens (2013-2014)

=== Monsters vs. Aliens (2009) ===
Monsters vs. Aliens is a 2009 American animated science fiction comedy film. It was DreamWorks Animation's first feature film to be directly produced in a stereoscopic 3D format instead of being converted into 3D after completion, which added $15 million to the film's budget.

The film involves the story of Susan Murphy who is excited to be married to weatherman Derek Dietl. But moments before her ceremony, she gets unexpectedly struck by a radioactive asteroid and during the ceremony, she grows up to a size of 50 feet tall. Once she grows into a giant, known as Ginormica, she gets whisked away by the United States Army and gets sent to a secret maximum security prison where she meets other monsters who had been rounded up over the past 50 years: Dr. Cockroach, (a scientist who became part cockroach during an experiment), The Missing Link, (a 20,000 year old macho fish ape who was thawed out from deep ice), B.O.B. (an indestructible gelatinous blob who was injected with salad dressing as a tomato), and Insectosaurus (a 350 grub who was mutated by nuclear radiation). The monsters do not fit in with society and are kept in the prison by General W.R. Monger, the army officer who is in charge of the facility. All the monsters get released when they are called in to save the world from an invasion by Gallaxhar, a villain from outer space, who wants to use the asteroid that hit Susan as the key to his invasion.

The film was originally scheduled for a May 2009 release, but the release date was moved to March 27, 2009. It was released on DVD and Blu-ray September 29, 2009, in North America and included the easter egg to the upcoming movies and previews. The film features the voices of Reese Witherspoon, Seth Rogen, Hugh Laurie, Will Arnett, Conrad Vernon, Rainn Wilson, Kiefer Sutherland, Stephen Colbert, and Paul Rudd.

=== Unproduced sequel ===
Despite its success in the United States market, DreamWorks Animation's CEO, Jeffrey Katzenberg was quoted in the Los Angeles Times in October 2009 that a sequel would not be made because of the film's weak performance in some key international markets. "There was enough of a consensus from our distribution and marketing folks in certain parts of the world that 'doing a sequel' would be pushing a boulder up a hill." In April 2011, Katzenberg commented about a sequel to Monsters vs. Aliens as well as Shark Tale and Megamind, saying: "All shared an approach and tone and idea of parody, and did not travel well internationally. We don't have anything like that coming on our schedule now."

== Television special ==
=== Monsters vs. Aliens: Mutant Pumpkins from Outer Space (2009) ===
Mutant Pumpkins from Outer Space is a 2009 Halloween special, directed by Peter Ramsey. It premiered in Ireland on RTÉ One on October 26, 2009, and aired in USA on the NBC channel on October 28, 2009. The special was first released on DVD in the UK on September 27, 2010, exclusive to Tesco stores, and in US it was released on September 13, 2011, and on September 27, 2011, along with Scared Shrekless. It was released on DVD and Blu-ray on August 28, 2012, as part of Shrek's Thrilling Tales (DreamWorks Spooky Stories).

After saving the day from Gallaxhar's wrath, Susan and her fellow monsters go back to Susan's home in Modesto, California; just in time for Halloween celebrations. Susan spends time with her parents, while the other monsters join in trick-or-treating and collect a large amount of candy. Later, it is revealed that the monsters came to destroy mutant pumpkins disguised as Jack-o-lanterns. When the pumpkins begin to eat children's candies to grow larger, the monsters and children defeat them by throwing excessive candy to bloat them up and explode them. But, in a twist ending, some of the pumpkin "blood" (a green goo that mutated the ordinary pumpkins) falls into a planting of carrots, causing a mutant carrot to be formed.

== Short films ==
=== B.O.B.'s Big Break (2009) ===
B.O.B.'s Big Break is a 3D animated short prequel film. The short premiered on Nickelodeon in 2D on September 26, 2009, and was released 3 days later in 2D and 3D on the Monsters vs Aliens Blu-ray and the double DVD pack.

Many years before the events of the first film, Dr. Cockroach Ph.D. and The Missing Link are trying to outwit Captain W.R. Monger to escape from Area 52, the government's top-secret holding cell, by disguising their escape plan as celebrating an oblivious B.O.B.'s "birthday". Cockroach's escape attempt by feeding B.O.B. a chemical mixture to turn him into a bomb instead results in B.O.B. temporarily acquiring the ability to read minds, and allowing them to find out about a secret exit from Area 52. Unfortunately, the plan fails when B.O.B. smashes the jet they were using to escape believing it to be a piñata, with the resulting explosion erasing B.O.B.'s new power. Afterwards, Link and Dr. Cockroach are forced to endure their humiliating defeat at B.O.B.'s "birthday party" by being mocked by both Monger and The Invisible Man.

=== Night of the Living Carrots (2011) ===
Night of the Living Carrots is a 2011 13-minute 3D Halloween short film based on Monsters vs. Aliens, and a sequel to Mutant Pumpkins from Outer Space. It was directed by Robert Porter. First part of the short premiered on October 13, 2011, and the second part five days later, for a limited time, exclusively on the Nintendo 3DS video service. It was released on August 28, 2012, on DVD and Blu-ray as a part of Shrek's Thrilling Tales (DreamWorks Spooky Stories).

Following the cliffhanger at the end of Mutant Pumpkins from Outer Space, the mutated carrot has spawned hundreds of zombie carrots, which can take control of a person's mind after biting them. Dr. Cockroach determines that the only way to defeat the carrots and free their victims is for B.O.B. to eat all of the carrots (specifically because B.O.B. has no brain and, thus, is immune to the carrots' mind control powers). Eventually, albeit reluctantly, B.O.B. agrees. At the end of the short, B.O.B. is turned into a giant zombie carrot, though this is never explained or followed up on.

== Television series ==
=== Monsters vs. Aliens (2013–2014) ===
An animated television series based on the film, titled Monsters vs. Aliens, aired on Nickelodeon between March 23, 2013 and February 8, 2014. A total of 26 episodes consisting of 2 11-minute segments were released. The cast featured new voice actors for the characters of Susan (Riki Lindhome), Dr. Cockroach (Chris O'Dowd), The Missing Link (Diedrich Bader), and B.O.B. (Eric Edelstein). This series was partly produced by New Zealand CG animation studio Oktobor Animation. The series was cancelled after one season due to low ratings and plans to refocus on more "Nickish" shows.

== Cast and characters ==
List indicators
- A dark gray cell indicates the character did not appear in that installment.
- An ^{A} indicates an appearance through previously recorded material.
- A ^{U} indicates an actor or actress was not credited for their respective role.
- A ^{Y} indicates a younger version of a character.

Characters	Feature film	Short films		Television special	Television series
Characters	Monsters vs. Aliens	B.O.B.'s Big Break	Night of the Living Carrots	Monsters vs. Aliens: Mutant Pumpkins from Outer Space	Monsters vs. Aliens
Susan Murphy / Ginormica	Reese Witherspoon		Archive footage	Reese Witherspoon	Riki Lindhome
B.O.B. Benzoate Ostylezene Bicarbonate	Seth Rogen	Seth Rogen	Seth Rogen	Seth Rogen	Eric Edelstein
Dr. Cockroach Ph.D.	Hugh Laurie	Hugh Laurie	James Horan	Hugh Laurie	Chris O'Dowd
The Missing Link	Will Arnett	Will Arnett	David Kaye	Will Arnett	Diedrich Bader
The Missing Link	Will Arnett	Will Arnett	Will Arnett^{A}	Will Arnett	Diedrich Bader
General Warren R. Monger	Kiefer Sutherland	Kiefer Sutherland	Kiefer Sutherland	Kiefer Sutherland	Kevin Michael Richardson
Insectosaurus / Butterflyosaurus	Jimmy Kimmel^{U}			Appeared	
Carl Murphy	Jeffrey Tambor		Jeffrey Tambor	Jeffrey Tambor	
Wendy Murphy	Julie White		Julie White	Julie White	
Gallaxhar	Rainn Wilson				
President Hathaway	Stephen Colbert			Photograph	James Patrick Stuart
President Hathaway	Stephen Colbert			Photograph	Kari Wahlgren^{Y}
Derek Dietl	Paul Rudd				Nolan North
The Invisible Man		Mike Mitchell			
King Coverton					Jeff Bennett
Sqweep					Haley Tju
Sta'abi					Gillian Jacobs

== Additional crew and production details ==
Film	Detail				
Film	Composer	Editor(s)	Production companies	Distributor	Running time
Monsters vs. Aliens	Henry Jackman	Joyce Arrastia and Erika Dapkewicz (Note: Credited as Eric Dapkewicz; Dapkewicz came out as transgender and changed her name in the 2010s.)	DreamWorks Animation	Paramount Pictures	94 minutes

== Video games ==
Two video games based on Monsters vs. Aliens were released on March 24, 2009 on Microsoft Windows, PlayStation 3, Xbox 360, PlayStation 2, and Wii, and one for the Nintendo DS, developed by Amaze Entertainment. The game, developed by Beenox, allows users to play through scenes from the movie as Susan, The Missing Link, and B.O.B., and features drop-in/out co-op. Players can play as Dr. Cockroach, Ph.D. in multiplayer co-op, as well as Insectosaurus in the Nintendo DS game. The music was composed by Jim Dooley, with live brass recorded at the Warner Brothers Eastwood Scoring Stage. The Monsters vs. Aliens video game has garnered a Metacritic score of 63 for the Xbox 360 version of the title.

Another video game titled Madagascar Kartz was released by Activision on October 27, 2009, for PlayStation 3, Xbox 360, Nintendo Wii, and Nintendo DS. Mainly based on the Madagascar franchise, the game also features B.O.B. and a racetrack based on the spaceship from Monsters vs. Aliens.

Another video game titled Super Star Kartz was released by Activision on November 15, 2011, for PlayStation 3, Xbox 360, Nintendo Wii, Nintendo DS, and Nintendo 3DS. The game features 14 different characters from DreamWorks' films – Monsters vs. Aliens, Madagascar, Shrek, and How to Train Your Dragon.

A free mobile game based on the 2013 TV series, titled B.O.B.'s Super Freaky Job, was developed by Adrenaline and released on October 10, 2013 to iOS and Android. In the game, player must guide B.O.B. through challenges by rotating the world around him, to obtain spare parts for Dr. Cockroach, and earn stars for the Presidential Medal.
