= Monsters vs. Aliens (soundtrack) =

2009 film soundtrack album

Monsters vs. Aliens (Music from the Motion Picture)

Film score by Henry Jackman
- Released: March 24, 2009
- Recorded: 2008–2009
- Studios: AIR Studios, London; Media Ventures, Santa Monica, California
- Genre: Film score
- Length: 65:46
- Label: Lakeshore
- Producer: Henry Jackman

Henry Jackman chronology
Monsters vs. Aliens (2009)	Henri 4 (2010)

Monsters vs. Aliens (Music from the Motion Picture) is the soundtrack album composed by Henry Jackman for the film of the same name and released by Lakeshore Records on March 24, 2009.

== Background ==
Monsters vs. Aliens was initially set to be scored by Mark Mothersbaugh, but was eventually replaced by Henry Jackman. The film was Jackman's feature film scoring debut; Jackman previously worked at Hans Zimmer's Remote Control Productions (formerly known as Media Ventures), providing assistance to the composer in various projects, this included the ones he composed for DreamWorks Animation projects. The soundtrack was recorded at AIR Studios in London and released through Lakeshore Records on March 24, 2009.

== Reception ==
Jonathan Broxton of Movie Music UK considered Jackman's score to be "completely inoffensive, and enjoyable enough when taken at face value, but offers nothing in terms of innovation or any real depth". Philip J of Den of Geek considered the score to be disappointing as it "gives us the obvious buildups, the necessary tension, the soaring release…and nothing more" and further concluded that "it's not poor composition, but it's stiflingly textbook". Christian Clemmensen of Filmtracks wrote "the music for Monsters vs. Aliens does everything it needs to in order to suffice, but in the absence of any truly interesting parodies of classic monster and alien themes and styles, the score degenerates into a standard, anonymous affair."

William Ruhlmann of AllMusic added that "Jackman certainly uses his chance, employing a full orchestra to play a score that calls to mind the ambitious accompaniments to widescreen entertainments of the 1950s and, before them, the classical compositions of the Romantic Era". He further added that the "Ginormica Suite" echoed John Williams's music. James Southall of Movie Wave wrote "This very pleasant album comes recommended – there's no creativity here, but there is certainly fun to be had." Hugh Hart of Wired wrote "A bristling score by Hans Zimmer protege Henry Jackman prods the escapades whenever the mostly snappy dialogue flags". Read Junk considered the album to be a "great start to Jackman's scoring career", while Summer Suzuki of Fandomania called it an "upbeat soundtrack that remains light-hearted and well aware of its target audience". Todd McCarthy of Variety and A. O. Scott of The New York Times considered the score to be fascinating and enjoyable.

== Track listing ==
No.	Title	Length
1.	"A Giant Transformation"	3:05
2.	"When You See (Those Flying Saucers)"	2:17
3.	"Tell Him"	2:35
4.	"A Wedding Interrupted"	2:09
5.	"Meet The Monsters"	2:29
6.	"Trouble" (Bitter:Sweet)	3:22
7.	"Do Something Violent!"	2:07
8.	"The Grand Tour"	2:10
9.	"Oversized Tin Can"	3:38
10.	"The Battle At Golden Gate Bridge"	6:08
11.	"Didn't Mean To Crush You"	1:51
12.	"Reminiscing"	4:14
13.	"Imprisoned By A Strange Being"	5:28
14.	"Galazar As A Squidling"	2:06
15.	"March Of The Buffoons"	5:15
16.	"Wooly Bully"	2:21
17.	"Susan's Call To Arms"	3:02
18.	"The Ginormica Suite"	5:51
19.	"Monster Mojo"	2:08
20.	"Purple People Eater"	2:15
Total length:		65:46

== Personnel ==
Credits adapted from liner notes:

- Music composer – Henry Jackman
- Music producer – Hans Zimmer
- Arrangement – Matthew Margeson
- Technical engineer – Jack Dolman
- Assistant engineer – Chris Barrett, Richard Robson, Tom Bailey
- Recording – Nick Wollage
- Mixing – Alan Meyerson
- Assistant mixing – Greg Vines
- Mastering – Louie Teran
- Music editor – Adam Smalley
- Assistant music editor – Peter "Oso" Snell
- Music production services – Steven Kofsky
- Technical assistance – Andrew Zack
- Studio manager – Czarina Russell
- Executive producer – Brian McNelis, Skip Williamson
- Music coordinator – Jennifer Schiller, Roger Tang
- Score preparation – Dakota Music, Ltd.
- Art direction – Stephanie Mente
- Layout – Joe Chavez
- A&R – Eric Craig
- Music business affairs – Dan Butler, Liz McNicoll
- Music clearances – Julie Butchko
- Executive in charge of music – Sunny Park
- Music manager – Charlene Ann Huang

Orchestra

- Orchestra leader – Perry Montague-Mason
- Orchestra conductor – Gavin Greenaway
- Orchestra contractor – Isobel Griffiths, Ltd.
- Assistant orchestra contractor – Lucy Whalley

Instruments

- Cello – Jonathan Williams, Paul Kegg
- Clarinet – Nicholas Bucknall
- Double bass – Allen Walley, Mary Scully, Steve Mair
- French horn – Richard Bissill
- Guitar – Aaron Kaplan
- Harp – Skaila Kanga
- Percussion – Satnam Ramgotra
- Trombone – Darren Smith, Roger Argente
- Trumpet – Andy Crowley, Neil Brough, Paul Archibald
- Viola – Bruce White, Rachel Bolt
- Violin – Boguslaw Kostecki, Chris Clad, Mark Berrow, Noah Sorota, Tom Pigott-Smith, Warren Zielinski

Choir

- Choir – Metro Voices
- Choir conductor – Gavin Greenaway
- Choirmaster – Jenny O'Grady
- Alto vocals – Vanessa Heine
- Bass vocals – Andrew Playfoot, Callum Mcintosh, Michael Dore, Peter Snipp
- Soprano vocals – Ann De Renais, Grace Davidson, Joanna Forbes, Sarah Eyden

== Accolades ==
Award	Category	Recipient(s) and nominee(s)	Result	Ref.
ASCAP Film and Television Music Awards	Top Box Office Films	Henry Jackman	Won	
