= Monsters vs. Aliens (video game) =

2009 video game

- Monsters vs. Aliens box art
- Developers: Beenox; Amaze Entertainment (Nintendo DS)
- Publisher: Activision
- Composer: Jim Dooley
- Series: Monsters vs. Aliens
- Platforms: Microsoft Windows; Wii; PlayStation 2 PlayStation 3 Xbox 360; Nintendo DS
- Release: NA: March 24, 2009; EU: March 27, 2009; AU: March 31, 2009
- Genre: Action-adventure
- Modes: Single-player, multiplayer

Monsters vs. Aliens is a 2009 video game based on the film Monsters vs. Aliens. The game was released on March 24, 2009 on PlayStation 2, Nintendo DS, Xbox 360, PlayStation 3, Wii, and Microsoft Windows.

The game, developed by Beenox on all platforms except the Nintendo DS which was developed by Amaze Entertainment, allows users to play through scenes from the movie as Ginormica, B.O.B., and The Missing Link, and features drop-in/out co-op.

Actors who reprised their roles from the film include Reese Witherspoon, Seth Rogen, Will Arnett, and Rainn Wilson.

== Gameplay ==
Players take control of Susan Murphy/Ginormica, Missing Link, B.O.B. and Dr. Cockroach Ph.D. in all platforms, as well as Insectosaurus on the Nintendo DS version of the game. Each level is divided into multiple stages in which the player takes control of each monster's unique abilities to fight off enemies. The Missing Link can stick to the sides of large robotic bosses, take control of missile turrets, and outwit his opponents with superior acrobatic skills. B.O.B. has to solve complex puzzles one step at a time in 3-D mazes, can turn floating plasma generators into personal turrets, slide through grates and use enemies as living key cards/ammunition. Ginormica can use cars, Jeeps and hover platforms as roller skates to dash, kick, jump, and duck enemies and fight all bosses to devastate enemies. If the player chooses co-op mode, Dr. Cockroach can either appear as a secondary player with B.O.B. or deploy his "Multiplayer Drone", which can shoot obstacles, enemies, and other items. Dr. Cockroach also has a "DNA Lab", where he uses Monster DNA collected throughout the game to purchase upgrades, extra content (CGI models, concept art, etc.), and extra levels. The music was composed by Jim Dooley, with live brass recorded at the Warner Bros. Eastwood Scoring Stage.

== Plot ==
The player starts out trapped in a monster containment facility under the command of General W. R. Monger, with Insectosaurus, Ginormica, B.O.B., The Missing Link, and Dr. Cockroach. Susan breaks a wall and the monsters escape and disable a giant anti-monster robot known as the US Avenger, but are recaptured by Monger, who is accompanied by a force of soldiers, tanks, and helicopters. Meanwhile, a giant crater appears, around which the military puts blockades and the President of the US tries to negotiate with an alleged extraterrestrial being. The crater explodes, and a giant alien robot probably the size of Insectosaurus emerges and begins destroying everything. Monger makes a deal with the monsters, promising freedom in return for the monsters' help in stopping the robot.

== Reception ==
On Metacritic, all versions received "mixed or average reviews". All platforms scored 5/10 at IGN, with an exception for the Nintendo DS version, which scored a 3/10.
