= Model–view–presenter =

Software design pattern

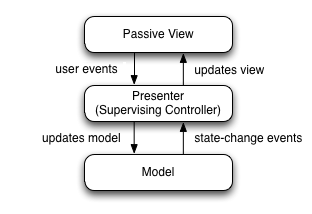
Diagram that depicts the model–view–presenter (MVP) GUI design pattern

Model–view–presenter (MVP) is a derivation of the model–view–controller (MVC) architectural pattern, and is used mostly for building user interfaces.

In MVP, the presenter assumes the functionality of the "middle-man". In MVP, all presentation logic is pushed to the presenter.

== History ==
The model–view–presenter software pattern originated in the early 1990s at Taligent, a joint venture of Apple, IBM, and Hewlett-Packard. MVP is the underlying programming model for application development in Taligent's C++-based CommonPoint environment. The pattern was later migrated by Taligent to Java and popularized in a paper by Taligent CTO Mike Potel.

After Taligent's discontinuation in 1998, Andy Bower and Blair McGlashan of Dolphin Smalltalk adapted the MVP pattern to form the basis for their Smalltalk user interface framework. In 2006, Microsoft began incorporating MVP into its documentation and examples for user interface programming in the .NET Framework.

The evolution and multiple variants of the MVP pattern, including the relationship of MVP to other design patterns such as MVC, is discussed in detail in an article by Martin Fowler and another by Derek Greer.

== Overview ==
MVP is a user interface architectural pattern engineered to facilitate automated unit testing and improve the separation of concerns in presentation logic:

- The model is an interface defining the data to be displayed or otherwise acted upon in the user interface.
- The view is a passive interface that displays data (the model) and routes user commands (events) to the presenter to act upon that data.
- The presenter acts upon the model and the view. It retrieves data from repositories (the model), and formats it for display in the view.

Normally, the view implementation instantiates the concrete presenter object, providing a reference to itself. The following C# code demonstrates a simple view constructor:

public class Presenter : IPresenter 
{
    public Presenter(IView view) 
    {
        // ...
    }
}

public class View : IView
{
    private IPresenter _presenter;

    public View()
    {
        _presenter = new Presenter(this);
    }
}

The degree of logic permitted in the view varies among different implementations. At one extreme, the view is entirely passive, forwarding all interaction operations to the presenter. In this formulation, when a user triggers an event method of the view, it does nothing but invoke a method of the presenter that has no parameters and no return value. The presenter then retrieves data from the view through methods defined by the view interface. Finally, the presenter operates on the model and updates the view with the results of the operation. Other versions of model–view–presenter allow some latitude with respect to which class handles a particular interaction, event, or command. This is often more suitable for web-based architectures, where the view, which executes on a client's browser, may be the best place to handle a particular interaction or command.

From a layering point of view, the presenter class might be considered as belonging to the application layer in a multilayered architecture system, but it can also be seen as a presenter layer of its own between the application layer and the user interface layer.

== Implementations ==
=== .NET ===
The .NET environment supports the MVP pattern much like any other development environment. The same model and presenter class can be used to support multiple interfaces, such as an ASP.NET Web application or a Windows Forms application. The presenter gets and sets information from/to the view through an interface that can be accessed by the interface (view) component.

In addition to manually implementing the pattern, a model–view–presenter framework may be used to support the MVP pattern in a more automated fashion.

=== Java ===
In a Java (AWT/Swing/SWT) application, the MVP pattern can be used by letting the user interface class implement a view interface.

The same approach can be used for Java web-based applications, since modern Java component-based Web frameworks allow development of client-side logic using the same component approach as thick clients.

Implementing MVP in Google Web Toolkit requires only that some component implement the view interface. The same approach is possible using Vaadin or the Echo2 Web framework.

Java frameworks include the following:

- JavaFX
- Echo2
- Google Web Toolkit
- JFace
- Swing
- Vaadin
- ZK

=== PHP ===
As of PHP's flexible runtime environment, there are wide possibilities of approaches of an application logic. Implementation of model layer is left on the end application programmer.

PHP frameworks include the following:

- CodeIgniter
- Laravel
- Nette Framework

== See also ==
- Multitier architecture
- Model–view–controller
- Model–view–viewmodel
- Presenter first (software approach)
