= David Kaye (voice actor) =

Canadian voice actor

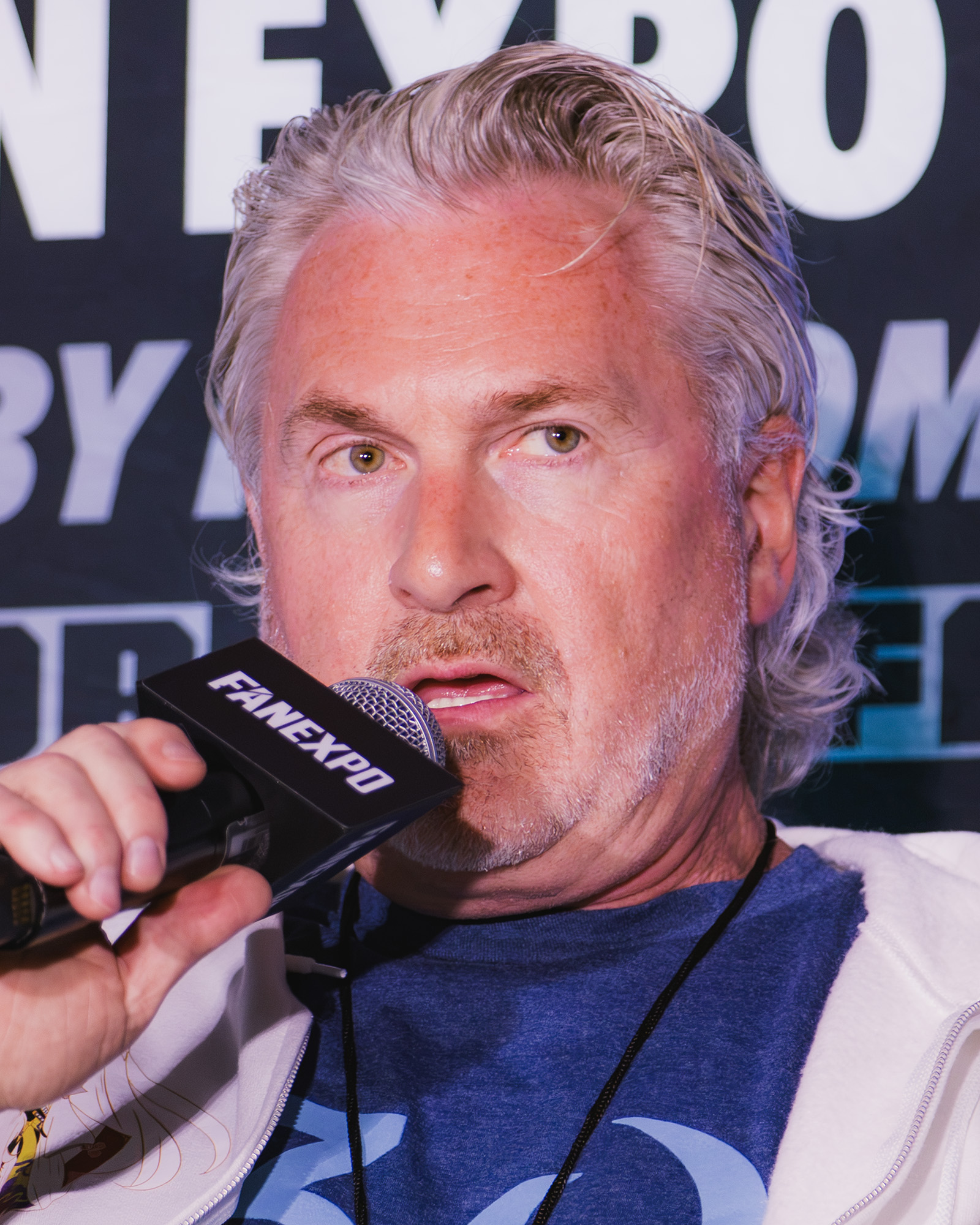
- Kaye in 2026
- Occupation: Voice Actor
- Years active: 1986–present
- Spouse: Maria Hope
- Children: 1
- Website: davidkaye.com

David Kaye is a Canadian voice actor. He is best known for animation roles such as two versions of Megatron throughout five of the Transformers series (Beast Wars, Beast Machines, Armada, Energon, and Cybertron), Optimus Prime in Transformers: Animated, Professor X in X-Men: Evolution, Cronus in Class of the Titans, Khyber in Ben 10: Omniverse, several characters in Avengers Assemble, and Duckworth in the reboot of DuckTales. He is also known for anime roles including Sesshōmaru in Inuyasha and Treize Khushrenada in Mobile Suit Gundam Wing, and video game roles such as Clank in the Ratchet & Clank series, Nathan Hale in the Resistance series, and Ford Cruller in the Psychonauts series. He is also the announcer for Last Week Tonight with John Oliver on HBO and voiced the Celestial Arishem in the Marvel Cinematic Universe film Eternals. He did voice work for various other studios in Vancouver, British Columbia, Canada for many years while occasionally doing voice work in Los Angeles, California, US, before fully relocating there in 2007.

== Early life ==
During the 1980s, Kaye moved to Vancouver to work in radio. He also did theatre, playing George in a production of Who's Afraid of Virginia Woolf? and Elwood P. Dowd in a production of Harvey.

== Career ==
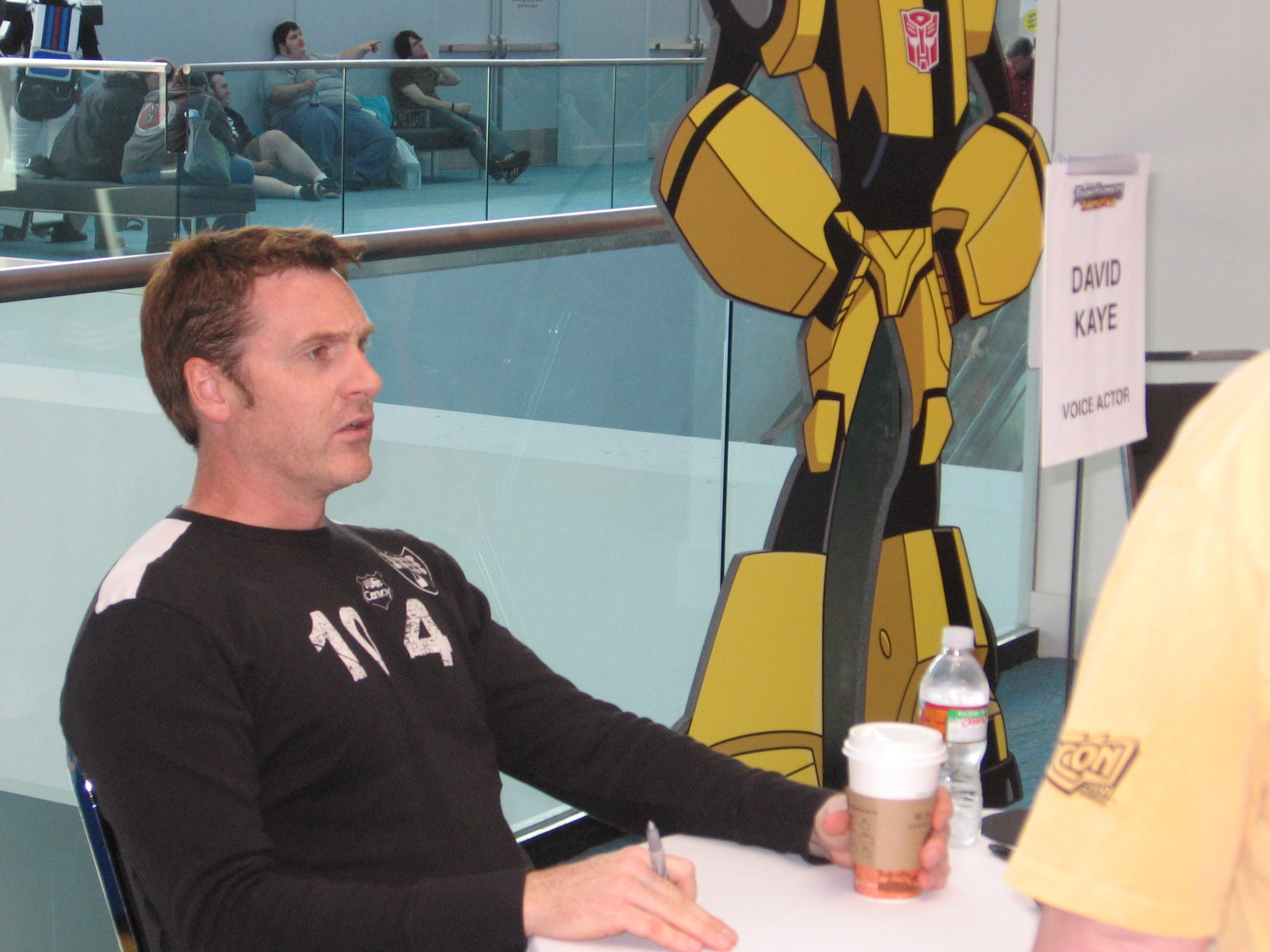
Kaye at BotCon, 2008

Kaye's voice acting career began in 1989 with General Hawk in the DiC animated series G.I. Joe. Working as an on-air talent for radio station CKLG (LG73), he quickly became less interested as both on-camera and voice roles started taking up more of his time. On-camera opportunities came in the form of guest roles on TV series and movies such as The X-Files, Battlestar Galactica, and Happy Gilmore. During this time, he was cast in several animation shows and video games, including a role as Megatron in Beast Wars. This began a decades-long relationship with the Transformers franchise. In 2007, Kaye became the first and (as of 2021) only actor in the franchise to play both Megatron and Optimus Prime in regular roles, voicing the latter for Cartoon Network's Transformers: Animated. He also lent his voice to the later series Transformers: Prime and Transformers: Robots in Disguise.

In anime, Kaye has been the voice behind Sesshomaru in the English dubbed Inuyasha series, Treize Khushrenada in Mobile Suit Gundam Wing, Recoome in Dragon Ball Z (1996–98) and as Soun Tendo in Ranma ½. His involvement in anime has led to several appearances at conventions. Kaye later moved to Los Angeles and has since worked on Ben 10: Omniverse as the villain Khyber, on Regular Show as Reginald, and on Xiaolin Chronicles as Clay Bailey, F-Bot, and Chase Young. He has voiced several characters on the Avengers Assemble animated series and Max Tennyson in the reboot of Ben 10. He shared the role of the Stretch Monster with Miguel Ferrer in Stretch Armstrong and the Flex Fighters, and also succeeded Ferrer as Vandal Savage in Young Justice: Outsiders following his death.

Kaye also narrates film trailers and network promos for ABC, Fox, The CW, National Geographic, TLC, FX, and others.

== Personal life ==
Kaye and his wife, Maria Hope, have a daughter named Tianna.

== Filmography ==
=== Animation ===
Year	Title	Role	Notes
1996–1999	Beast Wars: Transformers	Megatron	
1997	Kleo the Misfit Unicorn	Slim	
1997	Mummies Alive!	Talos	3 episodes
1997	ReBoot	Head Spectral	Episode: "Where No Sprite Has Gone Before"
1998	Fat Dog Mendoza	Announcer, Big Al, Matt, Pterodactyl #1, Spokesperson, P.A., Stan "The Hand" Tubbs	
1999–2000	Beast Machines: Transformers	Megatron, Noble	
2000–2001	D'Myna Leagues	Barry, Dave Maven	
2000–2003	X-Men: Evolution	Professor X, Apocalypse	Main role
2000–2004	Yvon of the Yukon	Additional Voices	
2000–2006	Kong: The Animated Series	Ramon de la Porta, Lex, News Anchor	
2003	Harvey Birdman, Attorney at Law	Officers, Police Guard	Episode: "Deadomutt"
2005	The Cramp Twins	Newscaster, Man	Episode: "News Whale"
2005	Stroker & Hoop	Ansel, Announcer	Episode: "Just Voodoo It"
2005	Being Ian	Jousting Announcer	Episode: "Joust Kidding Around"
2005–2006	Coconut Fred's Fruit Salad Island!	Bunga Berry, Rusty Candu	
2006	Tom and Jerry Tales	Mauricio	Episode: "Feeding Time"
2006–2008	Class of the Titans	Cronus, Logus, Arges, Centaur, Newscaster, Teen Mugger, Telekhine #1	
2007	Fantastic Four: World's Greatest Heroes	Iron Man	Episode: "Shell Games"
2007–2009	Transformers: Animated	Optimus Prime, Lugnut, Cliffjumper, Grimlock, Highbrow, Technician 1, Fan #2, Firefighter, Warpath, Sparkplug Witwicky, Security Bot (1), Customer (1), Intercom Voice, Trash Bot, Fan #1 (2), Nature Show Narrator, News Bot, Irate Citizen, Driver (2), Drone	
2009	Iron Man: Armored Adventures	Fin Fang Foom	Episode: "Tales of Suspense"
2009–2010	The Twisted Whiskers Show	Dander	
2010	The Marvelous Misadventures of Flapjack	Captain Santiago	Episode: "These Boots Were Made for Walking (On Your Face)"
2010	DC Super Friends	Superman, Hawkman	
2010–2017	Regular Show	Reginald, Head Baby, Keith, Announcer, Pizza Guy, Latin Teacher, Commercial Voice Over, Boss #3, Guy, Waiter, Dr. Rolard Baumengartner, Stress Machine, Monster, Beta Max, VHS Guy, Goon #2, Russel, Bavin, Paramedic #1, TV Announcer, TV AD, Kid #2, Sensai Student, Man #1, Microfiche, Eniac, Cop, Body Guard #2, Baby #2, Big Guy, Big Dude, Random Minion, Chaz Melter, Guy #2.	
2011	Ben 10/Generator Rex: Heroes United	Shocksquatch	Television film
2012	Star Wars: The Clone Wars	General Tandin	2 episodes
2012	Transformers: Prime	Hardshell, Trooper	2 episodes
2012	The Avengers: Earth's Mightiest Heroes	Supreme Intelligence	Episode: "Live Kree or Die"
2012–2014	Ben 10: Omniverse	Khyber, Shocksquatch, Cannonbolt, Gravattack, Heatblast, Swampfire, Skurd, Lord Transyl, Sunder, Frankenstrike, Joseph Chadwick, Gar Red Wind, Exo-Skull, Mole-Stache, Mallice, Thumbskull, Deefus Veeblepister, George Washington	
2012–2019	Avengers Assemble	J.A.R.V.I.S., Vision, Baron Zemo, Citizen V, Corvus Glaive, Baron Heinrich Zemo, Alien Guard #2, Blood Brother #1, Computer, Guard #1, Guardsman, Knight Bot #2, Miner #1, Miner #2, Modern Zemo, Phantom #1, Reporter, Robot, Troll Captain	
2013–2014	Xiaolin Chronicles	Clay Bailey, Chase Young, Barkey, F-Bot, Grandpappy, Mr. Goldwalala, Rocco, Salvador, Santa, Super Cow Patty	
2013–2014	DC Nation Shorts	Shazam, Bizarro, Ibac	
2014	Ultimate Spider-Man	J.A.R.V.I.S.	Episode: "The Avenging Spider-Man"
2014–2024	Teen Titans Go!	Death, Ferryman, Whimsy Robin, Whimsy Cyborg, Buster, Evil Dragon, Super Hero Trailer Announcer, City Inspector, Abraham Lincoln, Wizard of Weakness, Batman Ornament, Superman, Egghead, Glass Man, Carmen Conchanello	
2015–2016	TripTank	Police Dispatcher, Pilot, Interrogator	2 episodes
2015–2016	Be Cool, Scooby-Doo!	Duncan, Clive, Magician, Bradwick, Headless Count.	
2015–2017	Transformers: Robots in Disguise	Slashmark, Hammerstrike, Race Announcer	
2015–2017	Guardians of the Galaxy	Corvus Glaive, Nova Corps Controller	
2015–2019	We Bare Bears	Basketball Guy, TV Voice, Park Officer	
2016–2021	Ben 10	Max Tennyson, Shock Rock, Humungousaur, Azmuth, Bloxx, Lord Decibel, LaGrange, Melvin, Mr. Billions, Karl, Lester, Steve, Shock-O, Spider, Alternate Max, A.I. Max, Announcer, Announcer Steve, Bass, Big Announcer Voice, Bizmark, Boxer, Burly Hawg, Burly Villager, Bystander, Camperhand #1, Cannonbolt, Cannonbolt Max, Captain, Chefy, Chicken, Clown #2, Cop, Clerk, Crazed Customer, Crowd Guy #1, Cybear, Dad (Four Arms), Drone, Dream Salesman, Fang, Fisherman, Foreman, Forever Knight, Fulmini #1, Fulmini #3, Future Max, Ghost #2, Goon #2, Guard, Guard #1, Guy #2, Hippie, Host, Italian Guy #2, Knight #2, Mayor, Nerd, Person #1, Police Officer, Prospector Pete, Radio Voice #2, Reenactor #2, Rando Police Officer, Reporter, Tour Guide, Trucker, Videogame Voice, Voice, Voice Over Guy, Wizard, Worker, YEAH Announcer, Young Max, Zombie Guy #2	
2017–2018	Stretch Armstrong and the Flex Fighters	Stretch Monster, Epsilon Interviewer	3 episodes
2018	Legend of the Three Caballeros	Ghost Thomas Jefferson, Dapper Duck, Board Member 1, Yeti Massage Staff, Disney Narrator	
2018–2019	Trolls: The Beat Goes On!	King Peppy, Swamp Monster, Referee Troll	
2018–2021	DuckTales	Duckworth, Rhutt Betlam, Demonworth	
2019–2022	Young Justice	Vandal Savage, Elongated Man, Arion, Ryus Nereus, Steve Lombard,Kirby Jacobs	
2019–2022	Green Eggs and Ham	Crony 1, Dad Fish, Conductor, Executive 2, Joaquin Furmano, Taxi Driver, Guard 2, PA Announcer, Guy's Father, Snerz Announcer	
2020–2022	Scooby-Doo and Guess Who?	Angry Chef, Poetry Promoter, Gator Man Monster	
2021–2022	He-Man and the Masters of the Universe	Cringer / Battle Cat	
2022	Farzar	Barry Barris	
2023	Fright Krewe	Mayor Richard Furst, Harold Brumfeld	
2023	Digman!	Howard Toe	
2024	Lego Marvel Avengers: Mission Demolition	Vision, Hot Dog Suit Vendor	Disney+ Television Special
2024	Creature Commandos	Cop, Old Man	Episode: "Chasing Squirrels"
2024	What If...?	Arishem the Judge	Episode: "What If... Agatha Went to Hollywood?"
2024	Batman: Caped Crusader	William Hastings, Clown Patient, Orderly #2	
2024	Ranma 1/2	Beth Yamada	
2024	Pokémon Horizons: The Series	Gibeon	
2025	Iron Man and His Awesome Friends	Vision	

=== Anime ===
Year	Title	Role	Notes
1986–1987	Maison Ikkoku	Soichiro Otonashi	
1988–1989	Ronin Warriors	Narrator, Ancient One	
1989–1991	Ranma ½	Soun Tendo	
1993	Fatal Fury 2: The New Battle	Kim Kaphwan	
1994–1997	Key the Metal Idol	Tomoyo Wakagi	
1995–1996	Mobile Suit Gundam Wing	Treize Khushrenada	
1997	Night Warriors: Darkstalkers' Revenge	Pyron	
1997–2001	Dragon Ball Z	Recoome	Ocean Productions dub
1998	Eat-Man	Bolt Crank	Episode: "Bye Bye Aimie"
1999–2001	Monster Rancher	Monol, Captain Clay, Celius, End Bringer, Moo	
2000–2004	Inuyasha	Sesshōmaru	
2002	Ghost in the Shell: Stand Alone Complex	Batou	
2002	Tokyo Underground	Pairon, Narrator	
2002–2004	MegaMan NT Warrior	ProtoMan.EXE	
2003–2004	Transformers: Armada	Megatron, Galvatron	
2004	Transformers: Energon	Megatron, Galvatron	
2005–2006	Transformers: Cybertron	Megatron, Galvatron	
2020–2021	Yashahime	Sesshōmaru	

=== Television ===
Year	Title	Role	Notes
2006	Psych	Narrator	Episode: "Shawn 2.0"
2014–present	Last Week Tonight with John Oliver	Announcer	Voice

=== Film ===
Year	Title	Role	Notes
1994	Fatal Fury: The Motion Picture	Kim Kaphwan	
1996	Super Kid	Rockpile	English dub
1996	Adventures of Mowgli	Akela	English dub
1998	Rudolph the Red-Nosed Reindeer: The Movie	Cupid	
2000	Casper's Haunted Christmas	Narrator	
2002	Barbie as Rapunzel	Hugo, General	
2004	Inuyasha the Movie: Affections Touching Across Time	Sesshomaru	
2005	Hot Wheels: AcceleRacers	Deezel "Pork Chop" Riggs	
2006	The Ant Bully	Sleeping Ant, Guard Ant, Wrangler Ant	
2006	Inuyasha the Movie: Fire on the Mystic Island	Sesshomaru	
2006	Barbie in the 12 Dancing Princesses	Royal Doctor, Sentry	
2006	Kong: Return to the Jungle	Ramon de la Porta	
2007	Barbie as the Island Princess	Guard	
2007	Max Steel: Dark Rival	Warren Hunter	
2008	Barbie: Mariposa	Royal Guard	
2009	Up	Newsreel Announcer	
2009	Sing Along with Barbie	Additional Voices	
2011	Night of the Living Carrots	The Missing Link	
2013	Iron Man & Hulk: Heroes United	J.A.R.V.I.S.	
2014	Edge of Tomorrow	UDF Commercial	
2014	Iron Man & Captain America: Heroes United	J.A.R.V.I.S., Computer Voice	
2014	The Hero of Color City	Black, King Scrawl	
2015	Scooby-Doo! and the Beach Beastie	Grafton Blackstone	
2016	Ratchet & Clank	Clank	
2016	Shooting an Elephant	Narrator	Short film
2018	Teen Titans Go! To the Movies	Announcer, Trailer Voice	
2018	Scooby-Doo! and the Gourmet Ghost	Henry Metcalf, Edward Du Flay	
2020	Ben 10 Versus the Universe: The Movie	Azmuth	
2021	Eternals	Arishem the Judge	
2021	DC Showcase: Blue Beetle	Question	
2024	Justice League: Crisis on Infinite Earths	Question, Satellite, Cardonian Lantern	
2026	Clash of the Thundermans	Max's Computer	

=== Video games ===
Year	Title	Role	Notes
1997	JumpStart 1st Grade Math	Captain Hop, Spider Maestro	
2002	Ratchet & Clank	Clank, Bob, Blarg Scientist, Scrap Merchant	
2003	Impossible Creatures	Upton Julius, Henchman	
2003	Ratchet & Clank: Going Commando	Clank, Hypnotist Head, Employee	
2003	Mobile Suit Gundam: Encounters in Space	Soldiers, Pilots	
2004	Baldur's Gate: Dark Alliance II	Habdazar Doomwing, Artemis, Dorn Redbear	
2004	Pitfall: The Lost Expedition	Jonathan St. Claire, Graham	
2004	Transformers	Megatron	
2004	Hot Shots Golf Fore!	Clank	
2004	Ratchet & Clank: Up Your Arsenal	Clank	
2004	Inuyasha: The Secret of the Cursed Mask	Sesshomaru	
2005	Psychonauts	Ford Cruller, Hulking Lungfish, Captain O'Lungfish	
2005	Inuyasha: Feudal Combat	Sesshomaru	
2005	Ratchet: Deadlocked	Clank, Robot C	
2007	Ratchet & Clank: Size Matters	Clank	
2007	Ratchet & Clank Future: Tools of Destruction	Clank	
2009	Terminator Salvation	O'Grady, Resistance Helicopter Pilot	
2009	Where the Wild Things Are	Carol	
2009	Ratchet & Clank Future: A Crack in Time	Clank	
2010	Spider-Man: Shattered Dimensions	Mysterio	
2011	PlayStation Move Heroes	Clank	
2011	Dead Island	Logan Carter	
2011	Ratchet & Clank: All 4 One	Clank	
2011	Batman: Arkham City	Commissioner Jim Gordon	
2012	Ben 10: Omniverse	Khyber, Heatblast, Cannonbolt, Gravattack, Shocksquatch, Arachnoid	
2012	PlayStation All-Stars Battle Royale	Clank	
2012	Ratchet & Clank: Full Frontal Assault	Clank	
2013	The Cave	Weight Guesser, Roulette Barker, Magician	
2013	Dead Island: Riptide	Logan Carter	
2013	Fuse	Lyndon Burgess, Scientist, Pilot	
2013	The Wolf Among Us	Dr. Swineheart	
2013	Ben 10: Omniverse 2	Cannonbolt, Gravattack, Swampfire	
2013	Ratchet & Clank: Into the Nexus	Clank, Stone Stonefield	
2014	Disney Infinity 2.0	J.A.R.V.I.S., Mysterio	
2015	Disney Infinity 3.0	Vision	
2016	Adrift	Samuel Hocking	
2016	Ratchet & Clank	Clank, Dallas Wannamaker, Announcer, Warbot	
2017	Super Bomberman R	Clank	
2017	LawBreakers	AEGIS	
2017	Marvel vs. Capcom: Infinite	Jedah	
2019	Marvel Ultimate Alliance 3: The Black Order	Corvus Glaive, Vision, Mysterio	
2021	Ratchet & Clank: Rift Apart	Clank	
2021	Psychonauts 2	Ford Cruller, Ride Operator, Strawberry, Audience	
2021	Nickelodeon All-Star Brawl	Powdered Toast Man	
2022	Nickelodeon Kart Racers 3: Slime Speedway	Powdered Toast Man	
2022	Star Ocean: The Divine Force	Remington Kurtzman	
2023	Nickelodeon All-Star Brawl 2	Powdered Toast Man	
2023	Cookie Run: The Darkest Night	Darkest Lord Cookie, Elder Gnome	
2026	Grand Theft Auto VI	The Local Population	
