= Monsters vs. Aliens: Mutant Pumpkins from Outer Space =

2009 American TV special

- DVD cover
- Genre: Science fiction comedy Science fantasy Halloween
- Screenplay by: Adam F. Goldberg
- Directed by: Peter Ramsey
- Starring: Reese Witherspoon; Seth Rogen; Will Arnett; Hugh Laurie; Kiefer Sutherland
- Music by: Henry Jackman
- Country of origin: United States
- Original language: English

Production
- Producer: Latifa Ouaou
- Editor: Lynn Hobson
- Running time: 27 minutes
- Production company: DreamWorks Animation

Original release
- Network: NBC
- Release: October 28, 2009

Monsters vs. Aliens: Mutant Pumpkins from Outer Space is a 2009 Halloween television special, based on the Monsters vs. Aliens franchise. It was produced by DreamWorks Animation and directed by Peter Ramsey in his directorial debut. The special premiered in Ireland on RTÉ One on October 28, 2009, and aired in the USA on the NBC network on October 28, 2010.

== Plot ==
One night, a UFO appears on Earth and drops a strange green goo into a large pumpkin field. When Farmer Jeb comes outside to investigate, he is attacked and captured by something lurking in the field. On Halloween day, Susan Murphy aka Ginormica and her monster friends prepare for Halloween celebrations, though Dr. Cockroach Ph.D. has no interest in the holiday because of a traumatic memory from his childhood involving bullies stealing a swirly pop, his favorite candy. The monsters' prospect of Halloween is cut short when General Monger tells them that aliens have been detected in Modesto, California, and orders them to investigate. At Farmer Jeb's patch, pumpkins are mysteriously being given away for free, with one family taking the largest one that the son names Wicked Jack.

That night, the monsters visit Susan's parents, who have prepared for Halloween eccentrically. As Susan investigates the patch, the other monsters investigate the suburbs for aliens. Cockroach uses his scanner on various people while the Missing Link tries to scare people to no avail and B.O.B. has trouble remembering what to say when walking up to houses for candy. Cockroach's interest in Halloween is rekindled when an old lady presents him with a swirly pop. However, all the pumpkins come to life as a result of saturation from the green goo; Susan discovers this as she locates a captured Farmer Jeb. As the pumpkins in the suburbs attack the children, Cockroach, Link, and B.O.B. come to their defense, during which Cockroach discovers that the pumpkins grow bigger by eating candy. The pumpkins fall under the command of a now-giant Wicked Jack and head straight for the Murphy house.

Cockroach, Link, B.O.B., and the children rally against the pumpkins just as Susan turns up, but Wicked Jack fuses with the other pumpkins to combine and he become an even bigger giant. B.O.B decides to eat too much candy while the others attempt to defeat Wicked Jack seem to prove futile until Cockroach formulates a plan to overfeed the pumpkins with candy to bloat them up after seeing B.O.B. suffering from indigestion. While Susan keeps Wicked Jack distracted, the children‒backed up by Link and a Gatling gun platform built by Cockroach‒put Cockroach's plan into action. When all the candy is eventually used up, Cockroach sacrifices his swirly pop to push Wicked Jack to indigestion. As her parents come outside just in time, Susan sucker-punches Wicked Jack's head off before signaling Insectosaurus to destroy him. All the candy comes out unscathed and is collected by the children. As Cockroach ends his tragic dislike for Halloween since his childhood by giving his swirly pop to a young girl, Susan's parents admit that they will have to get used to "sharing her with the world". A single surviving pumpkin tries to sneak away but is found and scared into exploding by Link. General Monger eventually arrives to congratulate the monsters. The special ends on a cliffhanger and also, on a plot twist ending when unbeknownst to them, green goo from the pumpkin Link scared saturates a planting of carrots, causing a mutant carrot to be formed.

== Cast ==
- Reese Witherspoon as Susan Murphy/Ginormica
- Seth Rogen as B.O.B.
- Hugh Laurie as Dr. Herbert Cockroach Ph.D.
- Will Arnett as The Missing Link
- Kiefer Sutherland as General W.R. Monger
- Rainn Wilson as Wicked Jack
- Jeffrey Tambor as Carl Murphy
- Julie White as Wendy Murphy
- Conrad Vernon as Man on Cell/Woman
- Rich Dietl as B.O.B. Kid/Husband/Young Man/Pumpkins
- Walt Dohrn as Link Kid
- Susan Fitzer as Little Girl
- Ava Kelly as Cat Girl
- Andrea Montana Knoll as Mom
- Latifa Ouaou as Boy/Old Lady
- Peter Ramsey as Dad/Farmer Jeb

== Home media ==
The special was first released on DVD in the UK on September 27, 2010, exclusively at Tesco stores. In the US it was released as a stand-alone version on September 13, 2011, and on September 27, 2011, along with Scared Shrekless. It got its Blu-ray release on August 28, 2012, as a part of DreamWorks Spooky Stories.

== Sequel ==
A sequel titled Night of the Living Carrots was released in October 2011 in two parts exclusively on the Nintendo 3DS video service until receiving a general release on August 28, 2012, as part of the Shrek's Thrilling Tales DVD and DreamWorks Spooky Stories Blu-ray. It directly follows Mutant Pumpkins, Dr. Cockroach, Link and B.O.B. trying to defeat hundreds of zombie carrots.

== See also ==
- List of films set around Halloween
