= Monsters vs. Aliens =

2009 DreamWorks Animation film

- Theatrical release poster
- Directed by: Conrad Vernon; Rob Letterman
- Screenplay by: Maya Forbes; Wally Wolodarsky; Rob Letterman; Jonathan Aibel Glenn Berger
- Story by: Rob Letterman; Conrad Vernon
- Produced by: Lisa Stewart
- Starring: Reese Witherspoon; Seth Rogen; Hugh Laurie; Will Arnett; Kiefer Sutherland; Rainn Wilson; Paul Rudd; Stephen Colbert
- Edited by: Joyce Arrastia; Erika Dapkewicz (Note: Credited as Eric Dapkewicz; Dapkewicz came out as transgender and changed her name in the 2010s.)
- Music by: Henry Jackman
- Production company: DreamWorks Animation
- Distributed by: Paramount Pictures (Note: In July 2014, the film's distribution rights were purchased by DreamWorks Animation from Paramount Pictures and transferred to 20th Century Fox before reverting to Universal Pictures in 2018 following NBCUniversal's acquisition of DreamWorks Animation in 2016.)
- Release date: March 27, 2009 (United States)
- Running time: 94 minutes
- Country: United States
- Language: English
- Budget: $175 million
- Box office: $381.7 million

Monsters vs. Aliens is a 2009 American animated science fiction comedy film directed by Conrad Vernon and Rob Letterman and written by Letterman, Maya Forbes, Wally Wolodarsky, Jonathan Aibel and Glenn Berger. Produced by DreamWorks Animation, it is the first installment in the Monsters vs. Aliens franchise. The film stars Reese Witherspoon, Seth Rogen, Hugh Laurie, Will Arnett, Kiefer Sutherland, Rainn Wilson, Paul Rudd, and Stephen Colbert. The film involves a group of misfit monsters (Witherspoon, Rogen, Laurie, Arnett) tasked by the United States Armed Forces to stop the invasion of an extraterrestrial villain (Wilson) and save the Earth in exchange for freedom.

It was DreamWorks Animation's first feature film to be produced in a stereoscopic 3D format instead of being converted into 3D after completion, which added $15 million to the film's budget.

Monsters vs. Aliens was released in the United States on March 27, 2009, by Paramount Pictures, to mixed reviews from critics. It was a box-office success, grossing $381 million on a $175 million budget. It was followed by two television specials, Mutant Pumpkins from Outer Space and Night of the Living Carrots, and a television series in 2013.

== Plot ==
In Modesto, California, Susan Murphy prepares for her wedding to weatherman Derek Dietl, who switches their honeymoon in Paris, France to Fresno, California for a career opportunity. However, just before the ceremony, a meteorite from a destroyed planet hits her. Susan initially appears unharmed, but during the ceremony, the energy that she absorbed from the meteorite causes her to grow 50 feet and 10 inches(15.49m) tall, accidentally destroying the church. A U.S. military detachment quickly arrives to tranquilize and capture her. Susan awakens in a top-secret government facility for monsters, where she meets General W.R. Monger, the 89-year-old U.S. Army officer in charge of the facility, and her fellow inmates: Dr. Herbert Cockroach Ph.D., a human-cockroach hybrid scientist; B.O.B. (Benzoate Ostylezene Bicarbonate), a brainless, indestructible gelatinous mass of blue goo; the Missing Link, a prehistoric 20,000-year-old fish-ape hybrid; and Insectosaurus, a 350-feet(106.68m) tall bug mutated by nuclear radiation. Susan is renamed "Ginormica" by the government and is forbidden any contact with her friends and family.

Meanwhile, faraway on a mysterious spaceship, a squid-like extraterrestrial alien overlord named Gallaxhar is alerted to the presence of "Quantonium", a powerful substance, on Earth; he sends a gigantic robotic retrieval alien probe. When it lands, the unintelligent President of the United States, President Hathaway, who is also Monger's boss, attempts first contact by playing "Axel F" on a keyboard, but the machine simply goes on a destructive attack straight towards San Francisco, unaffected by the military's attempts to destroy it. Monger convinces Hathaway to grant the monsters their freedom if they can stop the robot. In San Francisco, the probe detects the Quantonium within Ginormica's body and targets her. The monsters manage to destroy the probe at the Golden Gate Bridge by using parts of the bridge, so that the government sets them free.

Gallaxhar sets a course for Earth to obtain the Quantonium himself while Ginormica returns home with her new friends and reunites with her parents. While the monsters cause accidental havoc due to their lack of social experience, Ginormica tries to reunite with Derek, but he breaks off their engagement, believing that she would overshadow his career. Initially heartbroken, Ginormica soon realizes that her life was better as a monster and that she achieved things without Derek involved at all and embraces her new self. Suddenly, Gallaxhar's ship arrives and abducts Ginormica, and Insectosaurus is shot and seemingly killed when he tries to intervene.

Enraged by her friend's supposed death, Ginormica breaks free and chases Gallaxhar, but he traps her in a machine that extracts the Quantonium from her body, shrinking her back to her original size. Gallaxhar then uses the extracted Quantonium to create clones of himself in order to launch a full-scale invasion of Earth. Monger manages to get B.O.B., Link, and Dr. Cockroach onto the ship, where they rescue Ginormica and make their way to the main power core, where Dr. Cockroach sets the ship to self-destruct to prevent the invasion. Confronting Gallaxhar on the bridge as he tries to escape, Ginormica reabsorbs the Quantonium, restoring her gigantic size and strength. Rescuing her friends, they flee the ship and are rescued by Monger and Insectosaurus, now metamorphosed into a butterfly. The ship explodes, killing Gallaxhar and his army.

Returning to Modesto, Ginormica, B.O.B., Dr. Cockroach, Link, and Insectosaurus receive praise from the people. Hoping to give himself a career boost, Derek tries to get back with Ginormica, but she rejects and humiliates him live on TV with B.O.B. swallowing Derek up and spitting him out. Monger informs the monsters that a monstrous snail named "Escargantua," mutated from falling into a French nuclear reactor, is slowly making its way to Paris, so the monsters head out to confront the new threat.

In a mid-credits scene, Hathaway, pleased with Monger's work for helping the monsters save the world from Gallaxhar, promotes him to the President's senior security staff/chairman of the Joint Chiefs of Staff as his reward (which is also his gift to him for his 90th birthday), but Hathaway's attempt to celebrate with coffee ends with him pressing the opposite button, causing their country's nuclear arsenals to launch. Realizing what he did, he then asks if anyone in the audience wants to freeze his head.

== Voice cast ==
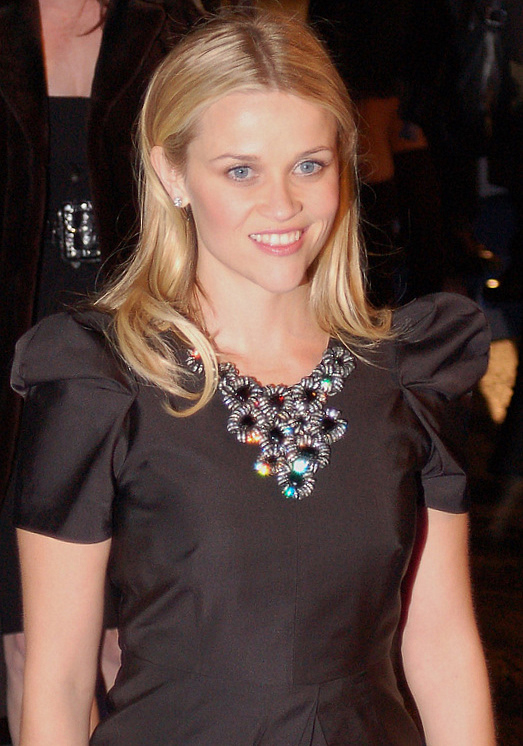
Reese Witherspoon at the British premiere of the film.

- Reese Witherspoon as Susan Murphy/Ginormica, a young woman from Modesto, California who gets hit by a radioactive meteorite on her wedding day, causing her to change drastically and grow into a 50 foot, 10 inch (15.49m) tall giantess. Her exposure to the quantonium also makes her hair change from brown to white and gives her super-strength and physical imperviousness.
- Seth Rogen as B.O.B. (Benzoate Ostylezene Bicarbonate), an indestructible blue gelatinous mass created when a tomato was injected with a genetically modified ranch-flavored dessert topping. He can devour and digest almost any substance. Despite having consciousness, he literally and figuratively lacks a brain.
- Hugh Laurie as Dr. Cockroach Ph.D., a brilliant scientist who attempted to imbue himself with the resilience and abilities of a cockroach, with the side effect of his head becoming that of a human-sized cockroach.
- Will Arnett as The Missing Link, a 20,000-year-old fish-ape humanoid who was found frozen and thawed out by scientists, only to escape and wreak havoc at his old lagoon habitat of Cocoa Beach, Florida.
- Rainn Wilson as Gallaxhar, an evil alien overlord intent on collecting quantonium, the substance that transformed Susan into Ginormica, to give his cloning machine enough power to generate an army of clones of himself to conquer Earth. He is served by gigantic one-eyed robotic alien clone probes, and claims to have suffered several traumas in his youth (which are left mostly unintelligible to the viewer, due to him telling Ginormica his story while being repeatedly photocopied to create his clones), driving him to destroy his own homeworld, and plans to make a new one on Earth.
- Amy Poehler as Gallaxhar's computer.
- Kiefer Sutherland as General W.R. Monger, a military leader who runs a top-secret facility where monsters are kept. It is his plan to fight the invading aliens with the imprisoned monsters in exchange for their freedom. In a scene during the credits, he claims to be 90 years old, in spite of both his youthful appearance and arrogant personality.
- Stephen Colbert as President Eugene Hathaway, the impulsive and rather dimwitted president of the United States. Not wanting to be remembered as "the President in office when the world came to an end", he agrees with General Monger's "Monsters vs. Aliens" plan when the U.S. Military is unable to defeat the robot probe sent by Gallaxhar.
- Paul Rudd as Derek Dietl, a megalomaniac local weatherman and Susan's fiancé. He jumps at whatever opportunity he has to boost his career, which causes him to place his job and himself before his relationship with Susan, canceling their plans to have a romantic honeymoon in Paris to land an anchorman job in Fresno, California and eventually ending their engagement.
- Jeffrey Tambor as Carl Murphy, Susan's overemotional father.
- Julie White as Wendy Murphy, Susan's loving mother.
- Renée Zellweger as Katie, a woman whose date with her boyfriend Cuthbert is interrupted by the landing of Gallaxhar's robot.
- John Krasinski as Cuthbert, Katie's boyfriend.
- Ed Helms as the News Reporter.
  - David James Koch provided the voice for the character for the Australian release of the film.

== Production ==
The film started as an adaptation of a horror comic book, Rex Havoc, in which a monster hunter Rex and his team of experts called "Ass-Kickers of the Fantastic" fight against ghouls, ghosts and other creatures. The earliest development goes back to 2002, when DreamWorks first filed for a Rex Havoc trademark. In a plot synopsis revealed in 2005, Rex was to assemble a team of monsters, including Ick!, Dr. Cockroach, the 50,000 Pound Woman and Insectosaurus, to fight aliens for disrupting cable TV service. In the following years, the film's story diverged away from the original Rex Havoc, with directors Conrad Vernon and Rob Letterman finally creating the storyline from scratch. Letterman would also co-write the film's screenplay with husband and wife duo Maya Forbes and Wally Wolodarsky, and screenwriting duo Jonathan Aibel and Glenn Berger.

Production designer David James stated that the film is "a return to what made us nerds in the first place," getting classic movie monsters and relaunching them in a contemporary setting. Director Conrad Vernon added that he found it would be a great idea to take hideous monsters and give them personalities and satirize the archetypes. Each of the five monsters has traits traceable to sci-fi/horror B movies from the 1950s, 1960s, and 1970s, although none is a mere copy of an older character. Susan/Ginormica, who grows to be 49 feet 11 inches tall, was inspired by Attack of the 50 Foot Woman. Dr. Cockroach represents The Fly and The Curse of Frankenstein, while B.O.B. is an amalgam of slithering and slimy characters that were featured in the films, including The Blob and The Crawling Eye. Insectosaurus, a 350-foot-tall monster, is a nod to the 1961 Kaiju film Mothra. According to Vernon, the Missing Link has no direct inspiration. He "just represents anything prehistoric that comes back to life and terrorizes people." For the San Francisco sequence, the producers researched many films and photographs for an accurate depiction of the city, and filmed animator Line Andersen, who had a similar body type to Ginormica— tall, thin, and athletic-looking— walking alongside a scale model of San Francisco, to capture better how a person not comfortable with being too big with an environment would walk around it.

Ed Leonard, CTO of DreamWorks Animation, says it took approximately 45.6 million computing hours to make Monsters vs. Aliens, more than eight times as many as the original Shrek. Several hundred Hewlett-Packard xw8600 workstations were used, along with a 'render farm' of HP ProLiant blade servers with over 9,000 server processor cores, to process the animation sequence. Animators used 120 terabytes of data to complete the film. They used 6TB for an explosion scene.

Starting with Monsters vs. Aliens, all feature films released by DreamWorks Animation were produced in a stereoscopic 3D format, using Intel's InTru3D technology. 2D, RealD 3D, IMAX 3D, and 4DX versions were released.

=== Soundtrack ===
Monsters vs. Aliens was initially set to be scored by Mark Mothersbaugh, but was eventually replaced by Henry Jackman. The film was Jackman's feature film scoring debut; Jackman previously worked at Hans Zimmer's Remote Control Productions (formerly known as Media Ventures), assisting the composer in various projects, this included the ones he composed for DreamWorks Animation projects. The soundtrack was recorded at AIR Studios in London and released through Lakeshore Records on March 24, 2009.

== Release ==
=== Theatrical ===
Monsters vs. Aliens was released by Paramount Pictures on March 27, 2009.

=== Marketing ===
To promote the 3-D technology that is used in Monsters vs. Aliens, DreamWorks ran a 3-D trailer before halftime in the U.S. broadcast of Super Bowl XLIII on February 1, 2009. Due to the limitations of television technology at the time, ColorCode 3-D glasses were distributed at SoBe stands at major national grocers. The Monsters, except Ginormica and Insectosaurus, also appeared in a 3-D SoBe commercial airing after the trailer. Bank of America gave away vouchers that covered the cost of an upgrade to a 3-D theatrical viewing of the film for its customers.

=== Home media ===
Monsters vs. Aliens was released to DVD and Blu-ray in the United States and Canada on September 29, 2009, and on October 26, 2009, in the United Kingdom. The home release for both the DVD and Blu-ray formats only contains the 2D version of the movie. However, the release is packaged with a new short, B.O.B.'s Big Break, which is in the anaglyphic 3D format that requires red and cyan glasses. Also included are four pairs of 3D glasses. On January 6, 2010, it was announced that a 3D version would be released on Blu-ray. On February 24, a tentative March release date was set for the United Kingdom, where anyone who buys a Samsung 3D TV or 3D Blu-ray player will get a copy. On March 8, it was reported that the 3D Blu-ray would be released in the United States, also with Samsung 3D products, on March 21. As of February 2011, 9.0 million home entertainment units were sold worldwide. In July 2014, the film's distribution rights were purchased by DreamWorks Animation from Paramount Pictures and transferred to 20th Century Fox; the rights are now owned by Universal Pictures following its parent company NBCUniversal's acquisition of DreamWorks Animation in 2016, and the expiration of their distribution deal with 20th Century Fox in 2017.

== Reception ==
=== Box office ===
Monsters vs. Aliens opened with $16.7 million on its opening day. The film grossed over $59.3 million on its opening weekend in 4,104 theaters with an average of $14,454, ranking number one ahead of fellow newcomer The Haunting in Connecticut ($23 million). Of that total, it grossed an estimated $5.2 million in IMAX 3D theatres, becoming the fifth-highest-grossing IMAX 3D debut, behind Star Trek, Transformers: Revenge of the Fallen, The Dark Knight, and Watchmen.

The film later dropped to number two earning $32.6 million on its second weekend, behind Fast & Furious ($70.9 million). Monsters vs. Aliens remained in the top 10 charts for nine weeks before leaving in May, and finished its box office run with $198.3 million in the United States and Canada, making it the second-highest-grossing animated movie of the year in these regions behind Up. With an additional $183.1 million from the international release, the film grossed a worldwide total of $381.5 million, becoming the third-highest-grossing animated film of 2009 behind Up and Ice Age: Dawn of the Dinosaurs. It was the highest-grossing film worldwide in Witherspoon's career until Sing overtook it in 2017.

=== Critical response ===
Based on 215 reviews collected by Rotten Tomatoes, Monsters vs. Aliens has an overall approval rating from critics of 73% and an average score of 6.5/10. The critical consensus reads: "Though it doesn't approach the depth of the best-animated films, Monsters vs. Aliens has enough humor and special effects to entertain moviegoers of all ages." On Metacritic, which assigns a normalized rating from mainstream critics, the film has received a score of 56 out of 100 based on 35 reviews, which indicates "mixed or average reviews". Audiences polled by CinemaScore gave the film an A− grade, on an A+ to F scale.

Roger Ebert of the Chicago Sun-Times gave the film two and a half stars out of four, writing, "I suppose kids will like this movie", though he "didn't find [it] rich with humor". Peter Travers of Rolling Stone gave the film three-and-a-half stars out of four and wrote that "WALL-E had more charm, more soul, more everything. But there's enough merry mischief here to satisfy, even if you're way past puberty."

=== Accolades ===
In 2009, the film was nominated for four Annie Awards, including Voice Acting in a Feature Production for Hugh Laurie. Reese Witherspoon and Seth Rogen were both nominated for best voice actor and actress at the 2010 Kids' Choice Awards for playing Ginormica and B.O.B, respectively, losing to Jim Carrey for Disney's A Christmas Carol. Monsters vs. Aliens was also nominated for Best Animated film losing to Pixar's Up. On June 24, 2009, the film won the Saturn Award for Best Animated Film.

Awards
Award	Category	Name	Result
Annie Awards	Annie Award for Best Animated Effects in an Animated Production	Scott Cegielski	Nominated
Annie Awards	Annie Award for Best Storyboarding in an Animated Feature Production	Tom Owens	Won
Annie Awards	Annie Award for Best Voice Acting in an Animated Feature Production	Hugh Laurie	Nominated
Kids' Choice Awards	Favorite Voice from an Animated Movie	Seth Rogen	Nominated
Kids' Choice Awards	Favorite Voice from an Animated Movie	Reese Witherspoon	Nominated
Kids' Choice Awards	Favorite Animated Movie	Rob Letterman; Conrad Vernon	Nominated
Saturn Awards	Saturn Award for Best Animated Film	Rob Letterman; Conrad Vernon	Won
Visual Effects Society	Animated Character in an Animated Feature Motion Picture	Terran Boylan; David Burgess; Scott Cegielski; David Weatherly	Nominated
Visual Effects Society	Outstanding Effects Animation in an Animated Feature Motion Picture	David P. Allen; Amaury Aubel; Scott Cegielski; Alain De Hoe	Nominated

== Expanded franchise ==
In April 2011, Former DreamWorks Animation CEO Jeffrey Katzenberg commented that the studio did not have plans to produce future movie-genre parodies like Megamind (2010), Monsters vs. Aliens, and Shark Tale (2004), nor sequels to these, saying that these films "all shared an approach and tone and idea of parody, and did not travel well internationally. We don't have anything like that coming on our schedule now."

The film was followed by two television specials titled Monsters vs. Aliens: Mutant Pumpkins from Outer Space and Night of the Living Carrots, then a television series which started airing on Nickelodeon on March 23, 2013, and was cancelled after one season due to low ratings and the network's desire to refocus on making the more "Nickish" shows.
