= Monsters vs. Aliens (TV series) =

American animated television series

- Genre: Comedy
- Based on: Monsters vs. Aliens by: Conrad Vernon; Rob Letterman
- Developed by: Mark McCorkle; Bob Schooley
- Voices of: Riki Lindhome; Eric Edelstein; Chris O'Dowd; Diedrich Bader; Kevin Michael Richardson; James Patrick Stuart; Jeff Bennett; Haley Tju; Gillian Jacobs
- Composer: Adam Berry
- Country of origin: United States
- Original language: English
- No. of episodes: 26 (50 segments)

Production
- Executive producers: Bret Haaland; Bob Schooley; Mark McCorkle
- Producers: Andrew Huebner; Kellie Smith
- Running time: 22 minutes
- Production companies: DreamWorks Animation; Nickelodeon Animation Studio

Original release
- Network: Nickelodeon
- Release: March 23, 2013 – February 8, 2014

Related
- Monsters vs. Aliens: Night of the Living Carrots

Monsters vs. Aliens is an American animated television series based on DreamWorks Animation's Monsters Vs. Aliens franchise. First announced in 2009, the series premiered on Nickelodeon on March 23, 2013, after the Nickelodeon Kids' Choice Awards, then began airing in its regular timeslot on April 6, 2013. A total of 26 episodes consisting of 50 segments were released, with the last episode airing on February 8, 2014. It was the third and final Nicktoon produced by DreamWorks Animation after Kung Fu Panda: Legends of Awesomeness and The Penguins of Madagascar. Following this, the series was not renewed for a second season. Later DreamWorks Animation shows would eventually be produced for Netflix, Hulu, and Peacock, starting with Turbo Fast.

== Synopsis ==
Six months after the events of the first film, Susan/Ginormica, B.O.B., Link and Dr. Cockroach learn to adapt to a new world as they work alongside a bizarre group of aliens at Area Fifty-Something, a secret underground base.

== Cast ==
=== Main ===
- Riki Lindhome as Susan Murphy / Ginormica
- Eric Edelstein as B.O.B.
- Chris O'Dowd as Dr. Herbert Cockroach
  - Robin Atkin Downes as Academic Dr. Cockroach, Party Dr. Cockroach
- Diedrich Bader as the Missing Link
- Kevin Michael Richardson as General Warren Monger
- James Patrick Stuart as President Hathaway
- Jeff Bennett as Coverton
- Haley Tju as Sqweep
- Gillian Jacobs as Sta'abi

=== Additional voices ===
- Dee Bradley Baker as Zombie Moon Ape
- Jane Carr as Miss Klangpopper
- Lucas Cruikshank as Smarty
- Will Friedle as Man-Beast
- Josh Gad as Internet
- Nolan North as Derek Dietl
- Joey Richter as Jace Lovins
- Amy Sedaris as Dr. Cutter
- Fred Tatasciore as Vornicarn
- James Urbaniak as Rule-Bot
- Kari Wahlgren as Baby President

== Production ==
In 2009, DreamWorks Animation CEO Jeffrey Katzenberg announced that Nickelodeon had ordered a pilot for a Monsters vs. Aliens cartoon series. Eventually, the series was announced at the 2012 annual Nickelodeon upfront, being green-lit for 26 episodes. The cast features new voice actors for the characters of Dr. Cockroach (Chris O'Dowd), Ginormica (Riki Lindhome), Link (Diedrich Bader), and B.O.B. (Eric Edelstein). The series was partly produced by New Zealand CG animation studio Oktobor Animation, similar to the other DreamWorks-based series The Penguins of Madagascar and Kung Fu Panda: Legends of Awesomeness. The executive producers of Monsters vs. Aliens (Bob Schooley, Mark McCorkle, and Brett Haaland) all previously worked on Penguins.

=== Cancellation ===
In November 2013, executive producer Bob Schooley announced on Twitter that Monsters vs. Aliens would not be renewed for a second season due to low ratings and the network's desire to "get back to the more Nickish shows". Later DreamWorks Animation shows would eventually be produced for Netflix, Hulu, and Peacock, starting with Turbo Fast.

== Episodes ==
=== Series overview ===
Season	Segments	Episodes	Originally released	
Season	Segments	Episodes	First released	Last released
1	50	26	March 23, 2013	February 8, 2014

No.	Title	Directed by	Written by	Storyboard by	Original release date	Prod. code	U.S. viewers (millions)
1	"Welcome to Area Fifty-Something"	Jim Schumann and Eddie Trigueros	Bill Motz & Bob Roth	Fred Osmond and Christo Stamboliev	March 23, 2013	101	3.13
All is well at Area Fifty-Something with Team Monster, until a lone alien imprisons the President and makes a permanent home on base. Note: This is a half-hour series premiere.
2a	"Danger Wears a Diaper"	Matt Engstorm	Kim Duran	Jeremy Bernstein	April 13, 2013	102	2.74
When everyone celebrates the president's birthday, Dr. Cockroach invents a gadget for him that will make him appear younger, but instead blasts him to an infant.
2b	"The Toy from Another World"	Sunil Hall	Brandon Sawyer	Brian Morante	April 13, 2013	102	2.74
The Monsters snoop in Coverton's quarters, where they find his "cuddle bear", which then attacks everyone on B.O.B.'s commands.
3a	"The Bath Effect"	Eddie Trigueros	Gabriel Garza	Christo Stamboliev	April 20, 2013	103	2.26
Ginormica makes B.O.B. think that baths cure crankiness. It leads B.O.B. to try to cure everyone at the base of crankiness. To stop him, everyone leaps into action, including Coverton.
3b	"The Fruit of All Evil"	Matt Engstorm	Bill Motz & Bob Roth	Jeremy Bernstein	April 20, 2013	103	2.26
After when Link accidentally eats the jello that B.O.B. calls his "girlfriend", this leads to the others to figure out how to break the news to him.
4a	"Frenemy Mine"	Matt Engstrom	Gabriel Garza	Sean Kreiner	April 27, 2013	104	2.20
B.O.B. is determined to have Coverton be his emergency buddy. Instead, Coverton chooses to manipulate B.O.B. to help him steal a death ray.
4b	"Maximum B.O.B."	Sunil Hall	David Tischman	Tom Bernardo	April 27, 2013	104	2.20
Impressed with B.O.B.'s indestructibleness, Coverton decides to clone a piece of him. After too many clones, B.O.B. alarmingly begins to diminish little by little.
5a	"It Came... on a Field Trip"	Sunil Hall	Brandon Sawyer	Brian Morante	May 4, 2013	105	2.71
The Monsters find a pink alien named Sqweep in the woods, doing an earth studies project, which has a lot of sensitive data that could be used for an invasion.
5b	"Educational Television"	Jim Schumann and Eddie Trigueros	Brandon Sawyer	Fred Osmond	May 4, 2013	105	2.71
After losing the cable, Link and B.O.B. use Sqweep's tablet TV. They find out they have to answer academic questions to keep on watching it, but instead start using it as a ray.
6a	"Flipped Out"	Eddie Trigueros	Brandon Sawyer	Fred Osmond	May 11, 2013	106	2.062
B.O.B. discovers a secret switch that General Monger tells him not to touch. Will it get rewired before the slow witted blob can get to flip it?
6b	"The Wormhole Has Turned!"	Eddie Trigueros	Brandon Sawyer	Christo Stamboliev	May 11, 2013	106	2.06
Dr. Cockroach overpromises that he's made a teleportation machine. Instead he's made a short wormhole and tries to pass it off as the real thing.
7a	"The Two Faces of Dr. Cockroach"	Sunil Hall	Eddie Guzelian	Piero Piluso	May 18, 2013	107	1.93
Dr. Cockroach is split into two personalities by his new teleportation machine.
7b	"The Thing with One Brain"	Matt Engstrom	Mark Palmer	Sean Kreiner	June 1, 2013	107	1.98
After causing runaway missiles because he thought the launch button was a lunch one, Dr. Cockroach builds a brain for B.O.B. Coverton installs an evil switch on it.
8a	"Night of the Living Dog"	Matt Engstrom	Todd Garfield	Jeremy Bernstein	June 8, 2013	108	1.79
Sqweep accidentally gives everyone except for B.O.B. the brain of a dog when she wants to do research on puppies.
8b	"Attack of the Movie Night!"	Jim Schumann	Gabriel Garza	Phillip Allora	June 15, 2013	108	1.80
After Sqweep suffers from nightmares after watching a horror movie, she creates a memory extractor to remove her memories from the movie to prevent from being afraid. But things go wrong when her device winds up and brings the creature from the movie to life.
9a	"98 Pound Cockroach"	Sunil Hall	Mark Palmer	Brian Morante	June 22, 2013	109	2.16
To get strong enough to pass an obstacle course, Dr. Cockroach tweaks his 50/50 man/roach genetic makeup so he'll be 40 percent man and 60 percent roach. His roach side keeps increasing at the cost of his human side and its intellect, forcing his teammates to find a way to reverse the process.
9b	"When Nature Shrieks"	Sunil Hall	John Behnke	Fred Osmond	June 29, 2013	109	2.01
General Monger takes Ginormica, B.O.B. and Sqweep on a camping trip in the desert. But when a lightning storm destroys their supplies and Monger is injured, Ginormica must take charge to get them back to the base.
10	"Vornicarn"	Sunil Hall	Brandon Sawyer	Brian Morante and Piero Piluso	September 14, 2013	112	1.71
When a vicious alien creature known as a Vornicarn hatches on Earth, the alien huntress Sta'abi arrives searching for it. Note: This is the second and final half-hour special.
11a	"It Got Out of Hand"	Fred Osmond and Jim Schumann	David Tischman	Fred Osmond	September 28, 2013	111	1.62
It's April Fool's Day and the other monsters are pranking everyone. But an apparent trip forward in time to the next day leads Ginormica to believe one of their pranks will cause the base's destruction.
11b	"The Sound of Fear"	Fred Osmond and Jim Schumann	John Behnke	Christo Stamboliev	September 28, 2013	111	1.62
Dr. C's former teacher reveals a missing music grade in his transcript, which could lead to all his diplomas and doctorates being revoked. Guest star: Jane Carr as Miss Klangpopper
12a	"The Sorry Syndrome"	Matt Engstrom	Kim Duran	Chris Graham	October 5, 2013	113	1.67
Ginormica accidentally angers Sta'abi by apologizing to her, which is considered a disgrace by her species that can only be remedied by hunting down the person who did so.
12b	"Speak Not the Q Word"	Sunil Hall	Brandon Sawyer	Piero Piluso	October 5, 2013	113	1.67
After hearing Sta'abi utter an unusual alien profanity (being Jortnurg), the monsters are informed that unlike Earth profanities, uttering alien profanities result in physical consequences. Coverton sees this as an opportunity to cleanse the earth of all human life and gives B.O.B. a list of those words to cause havoc.
13a	"Screaming Your Calls"	Sunil Hall	Bill Motz & Bob Roth	Jeremy Bernstein and Brian Morante	October 12, 2013	110	2.01
Dr. C brings his smartphone to life which soon imprints on him, until Coverton encourages 'Smarty' to hack into the base's mainframe. Guest star: Lucas Cruikshank as Smarty
13b	"The Time-Out That Wouldn't End"	Jim Schumann	Gabriel Garza	Philip Allora and Fred Osmond	October 12, 2013	110	2.01
Monger puts Sqweep in time out for making a mess, but soon the tables are turned when Monger makes his own mess and Sqweep puts him in time out.
14a	"Curse of the Man-Beast"	Sunil Hall	Brandon Sawyer	Brian Morante	October 19, 2013	120	2.00
Having hacked into Monger's top secret files and learned about a werewolf he'd previously tried to recruit to Team Monster, the monsters decide to go after the werewolf and recruit him themselves, only to discover there was a good reason he was left alone.
14b	"It Came from Level Z"	Sunil Hall	John Behnke	Piero Piluso	October 19, 2013	120	2.00
Ginormica becomes fed up with the other monsters being unsanitary and decides to bunk with Sqweep. When the boys discover "Level Z", where Monger keeps a bunch of frozen zombies he failed to recruit on Team Monster, they unfreeze one to be their butler, only to unwittingly cause a mass outbreak of the zombies.
15a	"Number Seven!"	Matt Engstrom	Brandon Sawyer	Chris Graham	October 26, 2013	118	1.56
Sqweep has to go "number seven", which could destroy Earth's entire waste sanitation system. When her ship gets disabled by Coverton to keep her from going back to her own planet for this "once every seven years" event, Dr. Cockroach is forced to build a new containment system for her use.
15b	"The Friend Who Wasn't There"	Matt Engstrom	Kim Duran	Stephen Heneveld	October 26, 2013	118	1.56
Link spends time with Sqweep to obtain her "Pheromonium" spray, which he believes will make Sta'abi attracted to him. However, it's intended for use by a race of alien mantises, and makes her and any other adult female want to eat him until it wears off.
16a	"Driven to Madness"	Matt Engstrom	Bill Motz & Bob Roth	Sean Kreiner	November 2, 2013	115	1.83
Link and Sta'abi duel for driving privileges of the new car that Sqweep built, they have to figure out how to stop it when Sqweep takes her own creation for a test run.
16b	"The Beast from 20,000 Gallons"	Sunil Hall	Bob Schooley & Mark McCorkle	Tom Bernardo	November 2, 2013	115	1.83
When an asteroid is detected heading for Earth, Team Alien is put in charge of the rocket being sent to destroy it. Meanwhile, Dr. C sends B.O.B. to play hide and seek. He winds up hiding in the fuel being used to power the rocket, and Team Monster must rescue B.O.B. and alter the rocket's trajectory so it'll hit its target.
17a	"The Sneezing Horror"	Matt Engstrom	Brandon Sawyer	Tom Bernardo	November 9, 2013	116	2.27
Coverton comes down with an alien flu, but when he sees it can make humans and monsters even sicker, he decides to infect everyone on base and use this time to steal base secrets.
17b	"Prisoner of the Dark Dimension"	Sunil Hall	John Behnke	Piero Piluso	November 9, 2013	116	2.27
Vornicarn's animal like behavior lands him in the Isolation Zone. When Link, who spent time there in the past, goes to keep him company, he accidentally sets him free, causing him to go on another rampage around the base until Team Alien and Team Monster can figure out how to calm him down.
18a	"I Predict Horror"	Matt Engstrom	Katherine Butler	Tom Bernardo	November 16, 2013	117	1.80
B.O.B. eats Dr. Cockroach's probabilitator (a device which can predict the future) and foresees Coverton going into a special room on the base and ending up with a crown and with people bowing before him. Coverton, hearing about this, decides to make it come true. However, he didn't realize the crown was for a broken tooth after he breaks into the room containing General Monger's training robot, which beats him up.
18b	"Destroy Chickie D!"	Sunil Hall	Mark Drop	Jeremy Bernstein	November 16, 2013	117	1.80
Sta'abi sees a commercial for Chickie D's, a chicken restaurant, and its mascot brings back traumatic flashbacks of the giant bird that attacked her village. Vowing to destroy the creature, she escapes the base to do so, and the others must stop her and bring her back.
19a	"The Mystery of Dr. Cutter"	Matt Engstrom	Gabriel Garza	Tom Bernardo	November 23, 2013	119	1.85
Dr. Cutter arrives to update the base's technology, and B.O.B. suspects she's up to something due to her wearing an eyepatch. He investigates with Ginormica's reluctant aid, until they discover she's out to kidnap Coverton and dissect his brain to learn the secrets of his telekinetic powers.
19b	"The Partymobile That Invaded Earth"	Fred Osmond and Jim Schumann	Brandon Sawyer	Philip Allora	November 23, 2013	119	1.85
Link and B.O.B. discover and fix up an old spaceship and take it for a joyride, unaware that Coverton has disabled its microphone so they can't communicate with the base. Subsequently, Monger believes they are hostile aliens and orders them shot down, and the two monsters must find a way to solve their communication problems before they get blown up.
20a	"Ginormicat!"	Matt Engstrom	Gabriel Garza	Chris Graham	November 30, 2013	121	1.89
Ginormica is struck by lightning while holding a stray kitten she's bringing back to the base, transferring some of her Quantonium to it and causing it to begin growing into a giant. Team Monster must find a way to reverse the transformation before the kitten grows bigger than the planet.
20b	"My Monster, My Master"	Fred Osmond and Jim Schumann	Bill Motz & Bob Roth	Emmanuel Deligiannis	November 30, 2013	121	1.89
After losing to B.O.B. in a video game, Sta'abi recruits him to teach her his unique combat style, and must subsequently put her new, unorthodox methods to use against the revived Rule-Bot. Guest star: James Urbaniak as Rule-Bot; Note: This episode takes place after the events of "It Ruled With an Iron Fist".
21a	"It Came from Channel 5"	Jim Schumann	Mark Palmer	Piero Piluso	December 7, 2013	114	1.88
Derek Dietl, Ginormica's ex-fiancé, tries to sneak into the base and expose the aliens there to the world. Coverton, seeing an opportunity, tries to use this to his advantage, but his plans are ultimately thwarted when Ginormica discovers what Derek is up to.
21b	"It Ruled with an Iron Fist"	Jim Schumann	Gabriel Garza	Stephen Heneveld	December 7, 2013	114	1.88
When Monger goes on leave for the weekend, he leaves the Cold War-era Rule-Bot in charge. Its obsessive behavior and incessant pestering over minor rule violations soon unites Team Monster and Team Alien against the robot as they attempt to get rid of it. Guest star: James Urbaniak as Rule-Bot; Note: This episode takes place before the events of "My Monster, My Master".
22a	"This Ball Must Be Dodged"	Fred Osmond	Brandon Sawyer	Philip Allora	January 4, 2014	122	1.43
Monger gathers everyone for a game of "monsters vs aliens" dodge ball. The aliens take out every other monster but Ginormica first since they consider her a low priority (since Link is the strongest, Dr. C's the smartest, and B.O.B. is unpredictable while the only thing Ginormica can do is change size and become a bigger target). Ginormica uses her new military training and combat knowledge to battle the aliens.
22b	"It Spoke with Authority"	Matt Engstrom	Bill Motz & Bob Roth	Stephen Heneveld	January 4, 2014	122	1.43
Dr. Cockroach creates a spray to give the president more authority. B.O.B. gets covered in it while Coverton was trying to steal it and then everyone (except Coverton) does what ever he says until it wears off.
23a	"Debtor Alive!"	Sunil Hall	Gabriel Garza	Jeremy Bernstein	January 18, 2014	123	1.91
When the monsters learn that Sqweep is a millionaire on earth, they begin to borrow from her allowance. When her financial planner Pip, who works for Epsilon-11 Allowance Management, comes to Earth to collect payment, they can't come up with money, so when Pip goes nuts and begins to repossess and sell their commodities for sale on the galactic marketplace (such as Link's gravity, Ginormica's focus, Dr. Cockroach's vocabulary, and Coverton's dignity), B.O.B. gives him "B.O.B. Bucks" to set everything right. When Pip accepts the B.O.B. Bucks as actual currency, he concedes all debts to be paid and leaves.
23b	"The Grade That Wouldn't Pass!"	Fred Osmond	Bill Motz & Bob Roth	Emmanuel Deligiannis	January 18, 2014	123	1.91
After Dr. Cockroach tampers with Sqweep's project for thinking an answer on there is incorrect, the alien receives a Zrob minus (the lowest possible grade in the galaxy). Guilt-ridden, Dr. Cockroach then traverses to the center of Earth to assist her in finding the correct answer to the science test.
24a	"You Can't Breathe in a Diner in Space!"	Matt Engstrom	Brandon Sawyer	Tom Bernardo	January 25, 2014	124	1.91
While working on another teleportation experiment, Dr. Cockroach accidentally teleports the diner with B.O.B. and the President inside to the moon. It's a race against time to get B.O.B. and the President back to Earth before their air runs out.
24b	"Race to the End...Zone!"	Sunil Hall	Gabriel Garza	Brian Morante	January 25, 2014	124	1.91
Link is disappointed when he can not play in the government football game.
25a	"When Luck Runs Out"	Sunil Hall	Devin Bunje & Nick Stanton	Tom Bernardo	February 1, 2014	126	1.91
When a leprechaun becomes a new recruit for Team Monster it becomes angry after being crushed by a vending machine.
25b	"That Which Cannot Be Unseen"	Fred Osmond	Bill Motz & Bob Roth	Emmanuel Deligiannis	February 1, 2014	126	1.96
After seeing something horrifying in Coverton's room, Team Monster submits to memory wipes. When they keep losing hours they try to not submit to memory wipes and find out what it is. They find out it is Coverton in a cocoon.
26a	"Bride of the Internet"	Matt Engstrom	Brandon Sawyer	Stephen Heneveld	February 8, 2014	125	1.88
When an embarrassing video of Ginormica hits the internet, Sqweep gets Internet, who is actually an alien and a friend of her, to remove the video. He gets a crush on Ginormica and goes as far as changing the national anthem to Ginormica's favourite song to get her to like him, but she rejects him so he tries to eliminate her. Guest stars: Joey Richter as Jace Lovins, Josh Gad as Internet
26b	"The Invisible Threat (Also Silent)"	Fred Osmond	Frank Rocco	Angelo Libutti	February 8, 2014	125	1.88
The president, wanting to find out Monger's "secret project", ends up in a metal robot he believes is a video game and battling the monsters and aliens.

== Home media ==
=== Region 1 ===
Despite the show being distributed by Viacom Media Networks (a division of Paramount Skydance), all the DVDs were distributed solely by 20th Century Fox Home Entertainment (as the show was also distributed by 20th Century Fox Television). The first two titles were later re-released by Universal Pictures Home Entertainment after NBCUniversal bought DreamWorks Animation in 2016.

Region 1
Season	DVD Title	Episode Count	Aspect Ratio	Total running time	Release Date
1	"Monsters vs. Aliens: Cloning Around"; Episode(s): "Welcome to Area Fifty-Something" – "Attack of the Movie Night!"	8	16:9	176 minutes	October 15, 2013; February 1, 2018 (re-release)
1	"Monsters vs. Aliens: Supersonic Joyride"; Episode(s): "98 Pound Cockroach" – "The Time-Out That Wouldn't End" • "Number Seven!" – "Prisoner of the Dark Dimension" • "It Came From Channel 5" / "It Ruled With an Iron Fist"	9	16:9	198 minutes	March 19, 2014; February 1, 2018 (re-release)
1	Monsters vs. Aliens: Creature Features (Redbox exclusive); Episode(s): "Curse of the Man-Beast" / "It Came From Level Z" • "I Predict Horror" – "My Monster, My Master" • "This Ball Must Be Dodged" / "It Spoke With Authority"	5	16:9	N/A	September 23, 2014

=== Region 2 ===
Region 2
Season	DVD Title	Episode Count	Aspect Ratio	Total running time	Release Date
1	"Monsters vs. Aliens: Cloning Around" Episode(s): "Welcome to Area Fifty-Something" – "Attack of the Movie Night!"	8	16:9	173 minutes	April 7, 2014

== Awards and nominations ==
Year	Award	Category	Nominee	Result
2014	Daytime Emmy Award	Outstanding Children's Animated Program	Bret Haaland, Mark McCorkle, Bob Schooley, Chris Neuhahn, Andrew Huebner, Kellie Smith	Nominated
2014	Daytime Emmy Award	Outstanding Sound Mixing – Animation	Justin Brinsfield, Matt Corey, Fil Brown, Melissa Ellis	Nominated
2014	Daytime Emmy Award	Outstanding Sound Editing – Animation	Robert Poole, Adam Berry, Michael Petak, Roy Braverma, J Lampinen	Nominated
