= Night of the Living Carrots =

- Film poster
- Directed by: Robert Porter
- Written by: Bill Riling
- Produced by: Lisa Stewart
- Starring: Seth Rogen; David Kaye; James Horan; Kiefer Sutherland
- Edited by: Bret Marnell
- Music by: Matthew Margeson
- Production company: DreamWorks Animation
- Distributed by: Nintendo (Nintendo Video); DreamWorks Animation Home Entertainment (through Paramount Home Entertainment, DVD release)
- Release dates: October 13, 2011 (Part 1); October 18, 2011 (Part 2)
- Running time: 13 minutes
- Country: United States
- Language: English

Night of the Living Carrots (also known as Monsters vs. Aliens: Night of the Living Carrots) is a 2011 American animated short film produced by DreamWorks Animation and based on the Monsters vs. Aliens franchise. A direct sequel to the 2009 short, Monsters vs. Aliens: Mutant Pumpkins from Outer Space, the short follows the monster team (minus Ginormica and Insectosaurus) taking on a mutated carrot army that can mind control others. Dr. Cockroach determines that the only way to defeat them and free their victims is for B.O.B. to eat all of the carrots, which ultimately stops the invasion.

The short originally premiered in two parts exclusively on the Nintendo Video video service for the Nintendo 3DS system; the first was released on October 13, 2011, and the second five days later. It eventually received a general release on August 28, 2012, as part of the Shrek's Thrilling Tales DVD and DreamWorks Spooky Stories Blu-ray.

== Plot ==
In a theater, B.O.B. introduces the story in a manner parodying typical horror films, with a recap of the events of Mutant Pumpkins from Outer Space, and tells the audience to be prepared for a story guaranteed to give them nightmares.

The scene then shifts to the twist ending of the previous special. The Zombie Carrot charges at the camera, but is stopped by a gate slamming into it. Ginormica's father, Carl announces to the children of the Modesto suburbs that a costume contest was starting and the winner would get their weight in candy. B.O.B., dressed as a pirate, takes all the candy. Outside, he's frightened by the zombie carrot, however, he mistakes it for a "child in a costume". Believing the carrot would win the costume contest, he throws it inside where it immediately bites Carl, turning him into a zombie.

The guests flee the Murphy house and the carrot is blasted by Dr. Cockroach's scanner. Carl snaps out of his zombie state and Dr. Cockroach theorizes that the carrot was contaminated by the mutant pumpkins and the curse could only be lifted by eliminating the infected carrot. However, the remains of the carrot generate a crop of zombie carrots, one of which reinfects Carl. Against Dr. Cockroach's advice, B.O.B. uses the scanner to blast the carrots and before long, B.O.B., Dr. Cockroach and the Missing Link are completely surrounded.

General Monger arrives but falls victim to the zombie carrots, as Dr. Cockroach, Link and B.O.B. retreat inside the house to create a barricade. B.O.B.'s bungling leads to Link getting infected and both Dr. Cockroach and B.O.B. retreat to Susan's old room, where a stray zombie carrot seemingly infects B.O.B.; this appears to have no effect however and Dr. Cockroach realizes that B.O.B. is immune because he has no brain. Dr. Cockroach is then ambushed by the carrot and, in his final moments before getting zombified, advises B.O.B. that the only way to save the day is if he eats all the carrots. B.O.B. reveals that he developed a fear of carrots from having been force-fed carrot puree by Monger at a young age. Unwilling to eat the carrots, B.O.B. escapes through the window to the roof, but when he sees his zombified friends, he resolves to eat all of the zombie carrots.

B.O.B. eats every zombie carrot, rendering him obese. He is about to eat a "Nutty Buddy Butter Bar" for dessert when he sees his friends are still zombies. The original zombie carrot appears and B.O.B. is unable to pursue due to his weight. The zombie carrot takes the bar and opens it to spite B.O.B., causing him to angrily chase it down and eat it whole as a "chocolate-covered carrot", yet claims it is "still disgusting". With the invasion finally over, Link, Monger and Dr. Cockroach snap out of their zombie-like states and hug B.O.B. simultaneously, which ultimately causes him to belch an extremely large orange cloud.

Back in the theater, B.O.B. reminds us to eat our vegetables, or "they just might eat you", but his shadow morphs into a zombie carrot as he leaves.

== Cast ==
- Seth Rogen as B.O.B.
- Kiefer Sutherland as General W.R. Monger
- James Horan as Dr. Cockroach
- David Kaye as the Missing Link
- Julie White as Wendy Murphy
- Jeffrey Tambor as Carl Murphy
- Bret Marnell as Zombie Carrot
