= List of science fiction television programs, P =

This is an inclusive list of science fiction television programs whose names begin with the letter P.

== P ==
Live-Action

- Painkiller Jane (2007)
- Pandora (2019–2020)
- Paradox (2009, UK)
- Parallax (2004, Australia)
- People, The (1972, film)
- Peripheral, The
- Person of Interest (2011–2016)
- Perversions of Science (1997)
- Phantom, The (franchise):
  - Phantom, The (2009, miniseries)
- Phantom Empire, The (1935)
- Phil of the Future (2004–2006)
- Philip K. Dick's Electric Dreams (2017, US/UK, anthology)
- Phoenix, The (1982)
- Phoenix Five (1970, Australia)
- Planet of the Apes (franchise):
  - Planet of the Apes (1974)
  - Saru No Gundan a.k.a. Sci-Fi Drama: Army of Monkeys (1974–1975, Planet of the Apes spin-off, Japan)
  - Time of the Apes (1987, film, Saru No Gundan compilation, Japan)
- Poltergeist: The Legacy (1996–1999)
- Power Rangers (franchise):
  - Mighty Morphin Power Rangers (1993–1995)
  - Mighty Morphin Alien Rangers (1996, miniseries)
  - Power Rangers: Zeo (1996)
  - Power Rangers: Turbo (1997)
  - Power Rangers in Space (1998)
  - Power Rangers: Lost Galaxy (1999)
  - Power Rangers: Lightspeed Rescue (2000)
  - Power Rangers: Time Force (2001)
  - Power Rangers: Wild Force (2002)
  - Power Rangers: Ninja Storm (2003)
  - Power Rangers: Dino Thunder (2004)
  - Power Rangers: S.P.D. (2005)
  - Power Rangers: Mystic Force (2006)
  - Power Rangers: Operation Overdrive (2007)
  - Power Rangers: Jungle Fury (2008)
  - Power Rangers: RPM (2009)
  - Power Rangers: Samurai (2011)
  - Power Rangers: Super Samurai (2012)
  - Power Rangers: Megaforce (2013)
  - Power Rangers: Super Megaforce (2014)
  - Power Rangers: Dino Charge (2015)
  - Power Rangers: Dino Super Charge (2016)
  - Power Rangers: Ninja Steel (2017)
  - Power Rangers: Super Ninja Steel (2018)
  - Power Rangers: Beast Morphers (2019)
- Powers (2004, UK)
- Powers (2015–2016)
- Powers of Matthew Star, The (1982–1983)
- Pretender, The (franchise):
  - Pretender, The (1996–2000)
  - Pretender, The (2001, first film)
  - Pretender: Island of the Haunted, The (2001, second film)
- Prey (1998)
- Primeval (franchise):
  - Primeval (2007–2011, UK)
  - Primeval: New World (2012–2013, Canada/UK, Primeval spin-off)
- Prisoner, The (franchise):
  - Prisoner, The (1967–1968, UK)
  - Prisoner, The (2009, miniseries)
- Prisoners of Gravity (1989–1994, Canada, documentary)
- Prisoners of the Lost Universe (1983, UK, film)
- Privateers, The (2000) IMDb
- Probe (1988)
- Project UFO (1978–1979)
- Psi Factor: Chronicles of the Paranormal (1996–2000, Canada)
- Pterodactyl (2005, film)
- Purple Monster Strikes, The (1945)
- Personal

Animation

- Packages from Planet X (2013–2014, animated)
- Panzer World Galient (1984–1985, Japan, animated)
- Parasyte (2014, Japan, animated)
- Partridge Family 2200 A.D. (1974, animated)
- Patlabor: The TV Series (1989–1990, Japan, animated)
- Pet Alien a.k.a. Alién Bazaar (2005, US/France, animated)
- Phantom 2040 (1994–1996, animated)
- Return to the Planet of the Apes (1975–1976, animated)
- Planet Prince (1958, Japan)
- Planetes (2003–2004, Japan, animated)
- Plastic Man (franchise):
  - Plastic Man (2006, pilot, animated)
  - Plastic Man Comedy/Adventure Show, The (1979–1981, animated)
  - Mighty Man and Yukk (1979–1980, Plastic Man Comedy/Adventure Show, The segment, animated)
  - Rickety Rocket (1979–1980, Plastic Man Comedy/Adventure Show, The segment, animated)
- Power Team, The a.k.a. Acclaim Masters (1990–1992, animated)
- Powerpuff Girls, The (1998–2005, animated)
- Pretty Cure (franchise):
  - HappinessCharge PreCure! (2014, Japan)
  - Star Twinkle PreCure (2019, Japan)
- Prince Planet a.k.a. Planet Boy Popi (1965–1966, Japan/US, animated)
- Problem Solverz, The a.k.a. Neon Knome (2011–2013, animated)
- Project Blue Earth SOS (2006, Japan, animated)
- Project G.e.e.K.e.R. (1996, animated)
- Psycho-Pass (2012–2013, Japan, animated)
- Psycho Armor Govarian (1983–1984, Japan, animated)
