= The Angry Man of Jazz =

The Angry Man of Jazz may refer to:

- Max Miller (jazz musician) (1911–1985), American jazz pianist and vibraphone player, so dubbed by Studs Terkel
- Charles Mingus (1922–1979), American jazz double bassist, composer and bandleader, known for his often fearsome temperament
