= Offspring (character) =

- Cover to Offspring #1 (February 1999). Art by Frank Quitely.

Publication information
- Publisher: DC Comics
- First appearance: The Kingdom: Offspring #1 (1999); As Luke O'Brian: JLA #65 (June 2002)
- Created by: Mark Waid; Frank Quitely

In-story information
- Alter ego: Luke Ernie "Loogie" McDunnagh O'Brian
- Species: Metahuman
- Team affiliations: Teen Titans
- Abilities: Elasticity; Color alteration; Shapeshifting; Telepathic resistance

Offspring (Luke Ernie "Loogie" McDunnagh O'Brian) is a superhero appearing in books published by DC Comics. He is the son of Plastic Man, but did not inherit his powers of elasticity, instead gaining them from a watered down version of the acid that granted the original Plastic Man his powers.

Prior to his debut, the animated series The Plastic Man Comedy/Adventure Show featured a character called Baby Plas.

== Character biography ==
=== Kingdom Come ===
Offspring initially appeared in a self-titled one-shot issue which was released as a tie-in to the series The Kingdom. This series takes place in an alternative universe to the main DC Comics universe. Offspring later appears in the final issue of The Kingdom, where he works with Kid Flash, Nightstar, and Ibn al Xu'ffasch to combat Gog. He is treated as a joke professionally and personally by his friends, family, and even foes. However he learns to accept his place on the team as the funny member. His relationship with his father is close and happy; his girlfriend, Micheline, is unhappy with the lack of respect his goofy behavior is causing.

=== Mainstream continuity ===
In the series JLA, it is revealed that the Plastic Man of the main universe has a son named Luke McDunnagh – his illegitimate child by "Angel" McDunnagh – who has powers greater than his own, with the ability to easily change his color and mass as well as his shape. When Luke becomes involves with a gang, Batman intimidates him into leaving the gang and going back to his mother. Batman is disappointed in Plastic Man for being a poor father and advises him to consider getting back in touch with his son.

After Plastic Man is recovered from beneath the ocean, he takes time off to be with Luke, even mentally programming himself to forget his heroic identity and powers. Luke and Batman convince him to go back to action when Martian Manhunter regresses to a 'Burning Martian' identity, as Plastic Man was the only person capable of opposing him due to his immunity to psychic abilities.

Offspring appears briefly serving as a member of the Titans during the one year jump following Infinite Crisis. In the series 52, Offspring assists Steel in launching an attack on LexCorp when Lex Luthor kidnaps Steel's daughter Natasha. Offspring later appears in World War III, where he unsuccessfully tries to defeat Black Adam by grasping his brain from the inside.

Offspring is among the young heroes who are captured and brainwashed into fighting at the Dark Side Club. After being rescued by Miss Martian and Ravager, Offspring is offered a spot on the Teen Titans by Wonder Girl. Like most of the other survivors, he declines.

Following the DC Rebirth relaunch, Luke is reintroduced with roughly the same powers and personality, living with his birth mother Angel. He is reluctant and angry at his father for not meeting him for years (as Plastic Man was trapped in an egg-like form). However, Luke relents after the two play a game of basketball and he is given a ride in the Batmobile. Luke goes on to join the Terrifics as Offspring.

== Powers and abilities ==
Offspring has powers similar to Plastic Man, but they are not the same. When Luke was little, he drank an altered version of the acid that gave his father elastic properties, thus giving him abilities even greater than Plastic Man.

== Other versions ==
- An alternate universe version of Eel O'Brian, Jr. from Earth-12 appears in Plastic Man (1966). This version was born to Plastic Man and an unnamed woman. Initially lacking powers, he later drank the same acid that gave his father his powers. As an adult, he would go on to become the new Plastic Man, become romantically involved with Micheline "Mike" DeLute III, and join forces with the Inferior Five.
- An alternate universe version of Offspring appears in Kingdom Come.

== In other media ==
=== Television ===
- A predated version of Offspring named Baby Plas appears in the second season of The Plastic Man Comedy/Adventure Show, voiced by Clare Peck. This version was born with the same powers as his father and is cared for by Plastic Man's sidekick Hula-Hula.
- Baby Plas makes a non-speaking appearance in the Batman: The Brave and the Bold episode "Long Arm of the Law!". This version is the son of Plastic Man and his wife Ramona, cared for by Plastic Man's best friend Woozy Winks, and inherited his father's stretching powers like Baby Plas.

=== Miscellaneous ===
Luke McDunnagh appears in Injustice: Gods Among Us. This version is the estranged son of Plastic Man, whose superheroics leave him absent for most of Luke's life, and is a member of a terrorist group working against Superman's Regime. After being captured and incarcerated in an underwater, maximum security prison, Luke and the other prisoners are freed by Plastic Man.
