= Maxwell Miller =

Maxwell Miller may refer to:

- Maxwell Miller (politician) (1832–1867), journalist and politician in colonial Tasmania
- Edward Maxwell Miller (1911–1985), or Max Miller, American jazz pianist
- J. Maxwell Miller, American sculptor

== See also ==
- Max Miller (disambiguation)
