= Michael Miller =

Michael or Mike Miller may refer to:

== Entertainment ==
- Michael Miller (actor), played the role of Monk in the film Doc Savage: The Man of Bronze (1975)
- Michael Miller (director), American film and television director known for National Lampoon's Class Reunion (1982)
- Michael Miller (writer), Australian screenwriter of Underbelly: Vanishing Act (2022)
- Mike Miller (guitarist) (1953–2025), American guitarist
- Mike Miller (singer), member of the band LMNT
- Mike S. Miller (born 1971), comic artist and publisher

=== Fictional characters ===
- Mickey Miller, fictional character on the United Kingdom television series EastEnders, commonly known as Mike Miller
- Mike Miller, character in the film Air Mail
- Mike Miller, fictional character in the TV series The Last Man on Earth

== Sports ==
- Mike Miller (sprinter) (born 1959), American football player and track and field sprinter
- Mike Miller (baseball) (born 1989), American baseball player
- Mike Miller (basketball, born 1964), American basketball coach
- Mike Miller (basketball, born 1980), American basketball coach and former NBA player
- Mike Miller (gridiron football coach, born 1970), American football coach
- Mike Miller (American football coach, born 1991), American football coach
- Mike Miller (golfer) (born 1951), Scottish golfer
- Mike Miller (wrestler) (born 1951), American wrestler
- Mike Miller (Canadian football) (born 1989), Canadian football defensive back
- Michael Miller (footballer) (born 1994), Scottish football player
- Mike Miller (runner), 800 meters runner and winner of the 1994 4 × 400 meter relay at the NCAA Division I Indoor Track and Field Championships
- Mike Miller (sprinter born circa 1949), American sprinter, 1971 All-American for the Indiana Hoosiers track and field team

== Other ==
- M. Mike Miller (1929–2017), American politician and travel writer
- Michael G. Miller (born 1960), American politician, member of the New York State Assembly
- Mike Miller (Florida politician) (born 1968), American politician, member of the Florida House of Representatives
- Michael H. Miller (born 1952), admiral in the United States Navy
- Michael Horace Miller (1928–2016), Air Commodore RAF in the 1970s and the 15th Commandant Royal Observer Corps
- Michael I. Miller (born 1955), American biomedical engineer and neuroscientist
- J. Michael Miller (born 1946), Roman Catholic archbishop
- Mike W. Miller (born 1951), American politician
- Thomas V. Miller Jr. (1942–2021), known as Mike, American politician, president of the Maryland State Senate

== See also ==
- Mac Miller (1992–2018), American rapper
- Mike Millar (born 1965), Canadian ice hockey player
- Mick Miller (disambiguation)
