= Max Miller =

Max Miller may refer to:

== People ==
- Max Miller (comedian) (1894–1963), British comedian
- Max Miller (wrestler), (active 1904), American Olympic wrestler
- Max O. Miller, (active 1925), American inventor and film producer
- Max O. Miller (director) (1918–1992), American television and film director
- Max B. Miller (1937–2011), American film director and photographer
- Max Miller (jazz musician) (1911–1985), American jazz musician
- Max Miller (YouTuber), (born 1983), American chef, creator and host of Tasting History
- Max Miller (politician), (born 1988), U.S. representative and political advisor

== Characters ==
- Max Miller, a character on the television series Life with Derek

== See also ==
- Maxwell Miller (disambiguation)
- Mac Miller (1992–2018), rapper
- Mack Miller (disambiguation)
- Miller (surname)
- Max (disambiguation)
