= The Plastic Man Comedy/Adventure Show =

- Based on: Plastic Man by Jack Cole
- Developed by: Joe Ruby; Ken Spears
- Written by: Mark Jones; Elana Lesser; Cliff Ruby
- Directed by: Rudy Larriva; Manny Perez; Charles A. Nichols; John Kimball
- Starring: Mark Taylor as Plastic Man (live-action sequence)
- Voices of: Joe Baker; Michael Bell; Melendy Britt
- Narrated by: Michael Rye
- Country of origin: United States
- No. of seasons: 5
- No. of episodes: 112

Production
- Executive producers: Joe Ruby; Ken Spears
- Producer: Jerry Eisenberg
- Running time: 120 minutes (1979–80); 22 minutes (1980–81)
- Production companies: Ruby-Spears Productions; DC Comics

Original release
- Network: ABC
- Release: September 22, 1979 – February 28, 1981

The Plastic Man Comedy/Adventure Show is an American animated television series produced by Ruby-Spears Productions from 1979 to 1981; it aired right after Super Friends on ABC.

The show featured various adventures of the DC Comics superhero Plastic Man. The anthology show included several components, including Plastic Man, Baby Plas, Plastic Family, Mighty Man and Yukk, Fangface and Fangpuss, and Rickety Rocket.

By January 1980, it was reduced to 90 minutes, dropping Rickety Rocket, amidst low ratings. By the 1980–81 season, the format was reduced to a half-hour and retooled as The Plasticman/Baby Plas Super Comedy Show alongside two other Ruby-Spears productions Thundarr the Barbarian and Heathcliff and Dingbat. The show was repackaged by Arlington Television into 130 half-hour episodes, and released into national, first-run-off-network daily syndication in 1984. The Plastic Man Comedy Show was produced and directed by Steve Whiting and featured a live-action "Plastic Man", played by Mark Taylor.

== Premise ==
The origin of Plastic Man is never expressly stated on this series, but it is implied he was originally the small-time crook Patrick "Eel" O'Brian who reformed after he was left for dead by the mob and gained plastic stretch powers. Plastic Man, his girlfriend Penny, and his Polynesian sidekick Hula-Hula travel the world and are given their assignments from the Chief to stop any threat to the world. Plastic Man often retains his sense of humor even in dangerous situations, such as a giant octopus capturing Penny and Hula-Hula causing him to ask "What scout troop did he belong to?"

Only Plastic Man villains Doctor Dome, his henchman Lynx, Doctor Honctoff, Carrot-Man, and Spider came from the comics while every other villain was created for the series. The series has a regular consumer affairs public service announcement that presents simple consumer advice for viewers, such as shopping around various retailers for the best price, or going to the public library to see if a desired book is available to borrow instead of buying it.

In early episodes Penny has a crush on Plastic Man, who chooses to ignore it as he himself has a crush on the dark-haired female Chief. However, in the second season Plastic Man reciprocates Penny's crush on him and the two marry. The marriage produces a son who has the same powers as Plastic Man and spawns a lighter series of episodes featuring Baby Plas doing things such as saving his friends from neighborhood bullies.

== Production ==
The first episode of The Plastic Man Comedy/Adventure Show to air was "Louse of Wax", which was broadcast only once, as part of ABC's Saturday morning preview special for 1979. The episode was written by Mark Evanier, who recalled that "it was one of the fastest cartoon shows ever produced for television. I think from the time I wrote the script to the time it aired was about six weeks. We had finished production on Plastic Man for the time being. I got called in and I was told, 'We need to write another episode of Plastic Man and you're the fastest writer we've got.'" The plot was taken from an unused outline Evanier had written for the series. "Louse of Wax" used a different opening sequence from the one used in the rest of the series; according to Evanier, this was because the series opening had not yet been finished, so a different one had to be created to have the preview special ready in time.

== Cast ==
For each of the shows, the cast list is the same. Taylor Marks (a pseudonym of stand-up comedian Mark Taylor) played Plastic Man in the program's live action segments in syndication. John Stephenson is listed twice in the end credits.

- John Anthony Bailey as Sunstroke
- Joe Baker as Hula-Hula
- Michael Bell as Plastic Man, Dr. Astro (in "Plastic Man Meets Plastic Ape"), Marak, Junior Macintosh, Half-Ape (in "The Terrible 5+1"), Gearshift Swift (in "Sale of the Century"), Krime Klown (in "Krime Klown's Circus of Evil"), Nefario (in "The Sinister Super Suit")
- Susan Blu as Kim, Sally Jones
- Bart Braverman as Puggsy
- Melendy Britt as Chief, Penny
- Johnny Brown as Splashdown
- Peter Cullen as Brandon Brewster/Mighty Man
- Jerry Dexter as Biff
- Bobby F. Ellerbee as Cosmo
- Al Fann as Rickety Rocket
- Clare Peck as Baby Plas
- Michael Rye as Main Title Narrator, Dr. Lazarus Web (in "Evil Guider of the Giant Spider"), Skullman (in "A Scary Affair in the Skullman's Lair"), Hood (in "The Rickety Robbery")
- John Stephenson as Mayor, Fangface Narrator, Weed (in "The Weed", "The Terrible 5+1"), Spider (in "The Spider Takes a Bride"), Hugo (in "The Spider Takes a Bride"), Royal Rajah, Computerhead (in "The Terrible 5 + 1"), Anthead (in "Anthead"), Big Mouse (in "Big Mouse the Bad Mouse"), Magnet Man (in "Magnet Man"), Catman (in "Catman"), Dr. Rufus T. Gadgets (in "The Dangerous Dr. Gadgets"), Marble Man (in "The Malevolent Marble Man"), Mr. Van Pire (in "Never Retire with Mr. & Mrs. Van Pire"), Doctor Decay (in "Goldteeth's Bad Bite"), Dr. Lash (in "Kragg the Conqueror"), Clyde (in "Where There's a Will, There's a Creep"), Ironmask (in "A Time-Machine Trip to the Pirate's Ship")
- Dee Timberlake as Venus
- Frank Welker as Sherman Fangsworth/Fangface, Baby Fangs/Fangpuss, Yukk

=== Additional voices ===
- Marlene Aragon – Kitty Katt (in "The Kitty Kat Kaper")
- Keith Barbour
- Daws Butler – Count Graffiti (in "Count Graffiti Meets Plastic Man")
- Ruth Buzzi – She-Na-Na (in "Empire of Evil")
- Ted Cassidy
- Henry Corden – Goldteeth (in "Goldteeth's Bad Bite"), Kragg the Conqueror (in "Kragg the Conqueror"), Dogcatcher (in "Dog Gone Days"), Abdul the Giant (in "The Defiant Casablanca Giant")
- Danny Dark – Jeffery W. Moonbeam (in "The Horrible Headless Horseman Caper")
- Takayo Doran
- Walker Edmiston – Doctor Dinosaur (in "The Dangerous Doctor Dinosaur")
- Sam Edwards
- Ron Feinberg
- Linda Gary
- Joan Gerber
- Jerry Hausner
- Johnny Haymer – Howard Huge, Doctor Duplicator (in "Doctor Duplicator Strikes Again")
- Ralph James – Commodore Peril (in "The Colossal Crime of Commodore Peril")
- Stan Jones
- Casey Kasem – Beach Bum (in "Beach Bum's Crime Wave")
- Andonia Katsaros
- Keye Luke
- Laurie Main
- Larry D. Mann
- Shepard Menken – Joggernaut (in "Joggernaut"), Professor Friday (in "Joggernaut")
- Chuck McCann – Badladdin (in "Badladdin")
- Julie McWhirter
- Allan Melvin – Highbrow (in "Highbrow"), Sanfon Vulch (in "The Gluttonous Glop"), Coach Crime/Dee Gooder (in "Coach Crime's Big Play")
- Don Messick – The Clam (in "Wham Bam! Beware of the Clam!", "The Terrible 5 + 1"), Solex/Solar Plant Official (in "The Terrible 5 + 1")
- Howard Morris – Doctor Dome (in "The Diabolical Doctor Dome")
- Gene Moss
- Alan Oppenheimer – Half-Ape (in "The Horrible Half-Ape"), Dogmaster (in "Dogmaster"), Toyman (in "Toyman"), Time Keeper (in "Rob Around the Clock"), Vulture-Man (in "The Evil Designs of Vulture-Man's Mind")
- Stanley Ralph Ross – Dr. Superstein (in "Superstein")
- Hal Smith – Dr. Honctoff (in "The Day the Ocean Disappeared"), Computerhead (in "The Maniacal Computerhead")
- Harold J. Stone – Thunderman (in "Thunderman")
- Fred Travalena – Baby Man (in "Baby Man"), Miniscule Seven Leader (in "The Miniscule Seven")
- Ginny Tyler – Princess (in "Count Graffiti Meets Plastic Man")
- Herb Vigran
- Janet Waldo – HoneyBee (in "HoneyBee"), Dr. Frost (in "City of Ice")
- Lennie Weinrib – Ghostfinger (in "Ghostfinger")
- Nancy Wible - Badladdin's Henchgirl (in "Badladdin"), Elsie (in "Badladdin")
- William Woodson – Miro the Mentalist (in "The Menacing Mindreader"), Moonraider (in "Moonraider")
- Alan Young – Dr. Irwin Feldspar (in "Dr. Irwin and Mr. Meteor"), Hippotist (in "The Hippotist")

== Staff ==
- Story Editors: Mark Jones, Elana Lesser, Cliff Ruby
- Story: Mark Jones, Elana Lesser, Cliff Ruby, Mark Evanier, Gary Greenfield, Michael Maurer, Jon Kubichan, Steve Gerber, Norman Maurer, Sid Morse, Buzz Dixon, Jeffrey Scott, Ted Pedersen, Chris Vane, Gordon Kent, Shelly Stark, Roy Thomas, Larry Alexander, Larry Parr, Creighton Barnes
- Directors: Rudy Larriva, Manny Perez, Charles A. Nichols

== Episodes ==
=== Plastic Man ===
1. "The Weed" (09/22/1979) – Plastic Man takes on the Weed, a walking sentient plant. He and his henchmen rob the university of its plant growth formula in order to create his own monster. It plans to destroy the world's capitals, starting with Lima, Peru, unless an astronomical sum of money is ransomed to him. The Weed fails to realize his mutated plant monster may not behave like other plants.
2. "Dr. Irwin and Mr. Meteor" (09/22/1979) – The puny Dr. Irwin Feldspar finds a meteor that transforms him into the powerful Mr. Meteor giving him a Jekyll and Hyde personality. Mr. Meteor is too much even for Plastic Man, but Penny might become a big help.
3. "Wham-Bam! Beware of the Clam!" (09/29/1979) – A sentient clam with a pirate captain-motif, called "The Clam", steals a water-controlling machine from the Chinese government. The Chief tells Plastic Man the machine is in Italy, but that's a false report by the Clam's hoods. This leaves New York City undefended for the Clam to make a tsunami, evacuating NYC and flooding it completely except for the top floors of the tallest buildings. This diversion allows the Clam and his underlings to commit robberies as all the banks and department stores are now submerged.
4. "The Day the Ocean Disappeared" (09/29/1979) – Dr. Honctoff is stealing all of the oceans and seas around the world by using a secret formula to turn them into vapour and then bottling them. Plastic Man is called into stop Honctoff's dastardly deeds.
5. "The Horrible Half-Ape" (10/06/1979) – While working on a secret government project, Professor Darwin's experiment goes awry. The mistake is costly as it leaves Professor Darwin (quite literally) half ape and half human. Plotting for revenge, he plans to steal a visiting flying saucer to start an interplanetary war.
6. "Hugefoot" (10/06/1979) - Hugefoot steals a device that can make people see into the future and even makes off with Penny.
7. "The Minuscule 7" (10/13/1979) – A group of small gangsters called the Minuscule Seven plot to win a series of basketball tournaments their way. It's up to Plastic Man to stop them.
8. "Moonraider" (10/13/1979) – Moonraider is stealing NASA's spaceships in outer space.
9. "Superstein" (10/20/1979) – Dr. Superstein plots to steal the minds of people to power his monster army.
10. "Dogmaster" (10/20/1979) – Dogmaster plans to steal the formula for a power ray that has been hidden in a chimpanzee's brain.
11. "The Diabolical Doctor Dome" (10/27/1979) – Doctor Dome, his henchman Lynx, and two unnamed henchmen discover a way to extract Plastic Man's superpowers so that Doctor Dome can use them to commit crimes.
12. "Honey Bee" (10/27/1979) – Honey Bee plans to use a heat missile to turn the world into a 'hot house' so that only she and her insects will survive.
13. "The Dangerous Doctor Dinosaur" (11/03/1979) – Doctor Dinosaur uses his dinosaurs to help rob banks, as well as national landmarks.
14. "The Spider Takes A Bride" (11/03/1979) – One by one, the Spider starts to turn Queen Katherine's follower's into flies until she decides to marry him.
15. "Empire of Evil" (11/10/1979) – An airplane carrying two children of an important official crashes in the forbidden zone of Stone Island, which is run by a sinister group known as the Empire of Evil. Plastic Man and his friends are sent to rescue the children and return them to safety.
16. "The Corruptible Carrot-Man" (11/10/1979) – When Carrot-Man steals a map that will lead him to a cosmic scepter, Plastic Man must stop Carrot Man from getting to it.
17. "The Maniacal Computerhead" (11/17/1979) – Computerhead is an evil robot that has developed a device that can bring any machine to life. He then sets out to create an army of machines to take over the world.
18. "The Hippotist" (11/17/1979) – Hippotist is hypnotizing bank managers to rob their own banks and return the stolen loot to him.
19. "Badladdin" (11/24/1979) – Plastic Man must make a plan to stop an evil genie that's abducting teenagers at an alarming rate. The genie grants wishes to those that want to win. He then turns them into a statue of gold and takes them for his collection. His next target is Penny's cousin, who is in a track & field competition. Plastic-Man had once fought Badladdin before, and the villain is determined not to lose a rematch.
20. "Toyman" (11/24/1979) – Toyman is kidnapping famous people everywhere and is turning them into toys. Plastic Man is the last person on Toyman's list to abduct.
21. "Ghostfinger" (12/01/1979) – Plastic Man learns that Ghostfinger has returned to get revenge on the people responsible for sending him to prison. He uses a time machine to bring other evil ghosts from the past in to help him get his revenge.
22. "Highbrow" (12/01/1979) – Highbrow steals the world's most famous trains so that people will have to pay him to travel on them.
23. "The Kitty Katt Caper" (12/08/1979) – Kitty Katt discovers an Egyptian serum that can turn anyone into cats for her circus.
24. "The Colossal Crime Of Commodore Peril" (12/08/1979) – Commodore Peril holds the prized possessions belonging to three billionaires for ransom.
25. "The Terrible 5 + 1" (12/15/1979) – Solex uses his solar weapon to spring Weed, Half-Ape, Clam, Computerhead, and Disco Mummy from prison in order to lead them. However, they don't agree with his terms. When Solex starts disrupting their crimes, the five villains turn to Plastic Man for help.
26. "Joggernaut" (12/15/1979) – Joggernaught plans to steal an energy machine in order to use it to find the treasure of the Amazon City of Gold.
27. "Doctor Duplicator Strikes Again" (12/22/1979) – Doctor Duplicator is kidnapping politicians and replacing them with evil duplicate clones in order to steal government secrets.
28. "Thunderman" (12/22/1979) – Thunderman has stolen New York City and plans to sell it to the highest bidder.
29. "Count Graffiti Meets Plastic Man" (01/05/1980) – Count Graffiti wants revenge on the Royal Family of Oceantania after being exiled from the country. He plans on stealing the royal crown in order to make himself the new king, but Plastic Man has other ideas and plans on stopping his scheme.
30. "Sale of the Century" (01/05/1980) – Desperate for a sale, Gearshift Swift sells Earth to passing aliens. Now Plastic Man must save Earth from being pulled from its orbit by the aliens.
31. "Plastic Mummy Meets Disco Mummy" (01/12/1980) – An ancient Aztec Queen called Disco Mummy comes back to life, to steal the ancient treasure of Cortez from the government of Mexico. She tricks Plastic Man into helping her and then turns him into a mummy. He must find a way out if he is to have a chance to stop her.
32. "City of Ice" (01/12/1980) – The elderly Dr. Frost finds the city of ice and in it the power of eternal youth. After learning its secret, she plans on reversing the gases effect and use it on the world. Plastic Man has to stop her evil scheme to turn the world's population into old people.
33. "Plastic Man Meets Plastic Ape" (09/20/1980) – Dr. Astro has created a giant plastic ape and is using it to ransack New York. Plastic Man is called in to thwart his evil schemes.
34. "The Crime Costume Caper" (09/27/1980) – Greta Grim has designed the ultimate hi-tech villain suit. In order to sell it to every criminal in the world, she films a commercial starring none other than Plastic Man.
35. "The Royal Gargoyle Foil" (10/04/1980) – The evil Gargoyle is bent on stealing Doctor Ventor's invisible ray machine. Luckily, Plastic Man stumbles across the plan and decides to prevent the Gargoyles' scheme.

=== Plastic Family ===
1. "Presenting Baby Plas" – Baby Plas ends up becoming the star of a circus performance.
2. "The Abominable Snow Sport" – Plastic Man and Baby Plas enter into a winter sports competition and get sabotaged by their opponent
3. "Baby Plas' Finny Friend" – Plastic Man and Baby Plas are at the beach when they find a shark. Baby Plas throws a tantrum and demands Plastic Man gets it for him as a pet
4. "The Big, Big Crush" –
5. "Ali Baba Baby" – Plastic Man accidentally summons an evil genie who attempts to kidnap Penny.
6. "Mighty Museum Mess" –
7. "Rustlin' Rascals" –
8. "Calamity Cruise" –
9. "Who Undo The Zoo" – The Plastic Family is hanging out at the zoo when a Martian attempts to kidnap the animals with his shrink ray.
10. "Ozark Family Feud" –
11. "Dr. Strangeleaf" –
12. "Kewpie Doll Caper" –
13. "Rodeo Ruckus" –

=== Baby Plas ===
1. "Bad Luck Stroll" – Hula-Hula goes out to get some eggs and Baby Plas has to keep him from getting in trouble.
2. "Baseball Bully" – Baby Plas joins a game of backyard baseball but is bullied by a bigger kid.
3. "Haircut Headache" – Hula-Hula brings Baby Plas to the barber but Baby Plas tries to escape.
4. "Witchin' Worries" – A witch tries to get Baby Plas in her cauldron to complete a spell.
5. "Tiger Trouble" – Baby Plas finds a tiger and makes it his pet, but Penny tells him to keep it away from her Canary
6. "Clubhouse Calamities" –
7. "Babysitter Blues" – When a babysitter watches over Baby Plas, things get bad when she won't let him watch his favorite show.
8. "Sleepwalking Snafu" –
9. "Birthday Blowout" – Baby Plas has to beat his enemy at some party games.
10. "Movie Mischief" – When the Plastic Family goes to the movies, Baby Plas has to get food for himself and his parents..and watch out for a hungry dog!
11. "Tropical Trouble" –
12. "Frognapped" –
13. "Mummy Madness" – Baby Plas accidentally awakens a mummy at the museum and it goes after him.

=== Ruby-Spears Originals ===
The following segments were considered as a Ruby-Spears "originals" and did not crossover with the other segments of the show. Lineup in the first season consists of:

==== Mighty Man and Yukk ====
The adventures of a tiny superhero (voiced by Peter Cullen) and his talking dog sidekick (voiced by Frank Welker) who wears a doghouse-helmet because he is so ugly that he can destroy practically anything just by looking at it. The two of them protect their city from various villains when called in by the unnamed Mayor (voiced by John Stephenson).

==== Fangface and Fangpuss ====
This second season of Fangface is about a reluctant werewolf (voiced by Frank Welker) and his baby cousin (also voiced by Frank Welker) who also turns into a werewolf and their adventures with Fangfaces friends Biff (voiced by Jerry Dexter), Kim (voiced by Susan Blu), and Puggsy (voiced by Bart Braverman).

==== Rickety Rocket ====
An artificially intelligent rocket (voiced by Al Fann) was created by a group of African-American kid geniuses consisting of Sunstroke (voiced by John Anthony Bailey), Splashdown (voiced by Johnny Brown), Cosmo (voiced by Bobby F. Ellerby), and Venus (voiced by Dee Timberlake). They solve mysteries in the future, in the vein of Speed Buggy.

==== Second season segments ====
By its second season, it was cut down to 90 minutes and everything except Plastic Man and Baby Plas replaced by three new segments in the lineup:

- Heathcliff
- Dingbat and the Creeps
- Thundarr the Barbarian

== Home media ==
On October 20, 2009, Warner Home Video (via DC Entertainment, Hanna-Barbera and Warner Bros. Family Entertainment) released The Plastic Man Comedy/Adventure Show: The Complete Collection, featuring the 35 Plastic Man cartoons on DVD in Region 1. Contrary to the title, the Baby Plas, Plastic Family, Live-action intro segments, and other segments from Season 1 were not included and have yet to be officially released. The "Louse of Wax" episode was also omitted from the collection. The pitch and speed that were presented in the R1 Complete Collection DVD set were the international PAL versions, due to expensive costing issues when about to use and remaster the original NTSC film elements, with correct speed and pitch.
