= Injustice: Gods Among Us (comics) =

2013–16 DC Comics video game tie-in series

Publication information
- Genre: Superhero
- Publication date: January 2013 – September 2016
- No. of issues: 153 (digital); 60 (print)

Creative team
- Written by: Tom Taylor (Year Zero–Year Three: #1–7); Brian Buccelato (Year Three–Year Five: #8–12)
- Artist: Various

Injustice: Gods Among Us is an American comic book series that serves as a prequel to the fighting video game of the same name. The series takes place in an alternate reality, where Superman descends into villainy following his family's death at the Joker's hands. The Justice League is split by those who put their trust in Superman, establishing the totalitarian One Earth Regime, while Batman forms an insurgency out of the other half of the League to fight back against the Regime.

The series was written by Tom Taylor and Brian Buccellato, and illustrated by a number of artists, including Jheremy Raapack, Mike S. Miller, Bruno Redondo, Tom Derenick, and others. It was released digitally by DC Comics from January 2013 to September 2016, and was later released in physical comic book form and collected in trade paperback and hardcover editions.

== Plot ==
The story is split into the five years preceding the Injustice: Gods Among Us video game. While Year Zero takes place before Year One and tells the story of how the Joker got the idea to drive Superman to madness, Year One to Year Four sees Superman's totalitarian regime fighting against one enemy after another. Year Five concludes the struggle between Superman's regime and Batman's insurgency, as the latter attempt to summon counterparts of the Justice League from another universe for help, setting up the events of the game.

=== Year Zero ===
Year Zero features the Joker escaping from Arkham Asylum and breaking into Blackgate Prison to free Andre Chavard, whom he forces into helping him find an evil mystical amulet known as the Amulet of Apophis, using his grandson Stefan as leverage.

As the amulet had been buried in the past in the deepest part of the Mariana Trench by Alan Scott following World War II, the Joker teams up with Black Manta to dive down into the trench and get the amulet. He then begins using its powers to take control of members of the Justice Society and have them kill each other, resulting in the death of Jay Garrick.

The Joker goes to Egypt where he excavates the Helmet of Chaos, becoming Doctor Chaos. Now immensely empowered by the chaos magic from both the helmet and the amulet, the Joker attacks the Hall of Justice and easily defeats the heroes. Superman is possessed, but frees himself after Batman gets through to him and he destroys the Amulet of Apophis. The Joker takes this as a challenge to corrupt Superman following his defeat, leading to the events of Lois Lane's death.

=== Year One ===
Year One features the Insurgency led by Batman against the Justice League led by Superman and the establishment of the One Earth Regime.

In Metropolis, a pregnant Lois Lane is kidnapped by the Joker. While Superman searches for her, Batman and the Justice League deduce that the Joker has used Scarecrow's fear toxin and laced it with stolen kryptonite to affect Superman. Superman and the League track Lois to a submarine where the Joker and Harley Quinn are hiding, but Superman is attacked by Doomsday. He fights and defeats Doomsday, only to learn Doomsday is an illusion, and he has been fighting an unconscious Lois. Too late, he learns that Lois's heart was synced to a nuclear warhead, which detonates and destroys Metropolis when her heart stops. Blinded by grief and revenge, Superman kills the Joker despite Green Lantern's and Batman's efforts to stop him.

A grieving Superman decides that all violence must end, by force if necessary. He addresses the United Nations, with Wonder Woman beside him, revealing his secret identity and demanding an immediate cessation of all worldwide hostilities. In response, the United States government contracts Mirror Master to kidnap Jonathan and Martha Kent to use as leverage against Superman. Using increasingly draconian measures, the League locates Mirror Master, and Superman relocates his parents to the Fortress of Solitude. The global escalation continues, with Wonder Woman becoming Superman's advisor as the League stops conflicts by force. Batman and Superman grow increasingly at odds, with Batman questioning Superman's and the League's methods.

In the Pacific Ocean, the League responds to a whaling ship under attack by Aquaman at the head of an Atlantean army. Tensions boil over into a full-scale battle until Superman coerces Aquaman into backing down, but not before Atlantean armies appear on multiple coastlines as a reminder of Atlantis's power. In response, Superman lifts Atlantis and places it in the Sahara Desert. Aquaman backs down, telling Wonder Woman that he is willing to advise Superman as a fellow ruler, but she does not relay the message. In Australia, Superman and Wonder Woman violently respond to a public demonstration against the League's new tactics, crippling a fan and wannabe hero named Galaxor. The Flash, also present, begins to doubt the League's mission.

Following the destruction of Metropolis, Harley Quinn escapes police custody but is recaptured by Green Arrow. He takes her to Arkham Asylum, where Superman, Wonder Woman, and Cyborg have also arrived to relocate the inmates to parts unknown. Batman and Nightwing arrive to stop them, but were left shocked when Robin (who believes in Superman's new crusade) switches sides to join Superman. In the ensuing fight, Robin accidentally kills Nightwing, the shock of which ends all hostilities and Batman, overcome with rage, disowns Robin as his son.

At Superman's private urging, Catwoman goes to Wayne Manor to console Bruce Wayne. She and Batman secretly meet with the President, who asks Batman to neutralize Superman. He begins building a team to oppose Superman's League—including Catwoman, Green Arrow, Aquaman, Black Canary, Black Lightning, Huntress, Captain Atom, and Batwoman. With the battle lines drawn, Superman's League continues its mission of stopping conflicts by force. Shazam forces Black Adam to give up his power but begins to doubt Superman's mission as a result.

Lex Luthor is found as the lone survivor in the ruins of Metropolis. He meets with Superman's League and wishes to join them, promising to recruit more members to Superman's side. Meanwhile, Batman's League kidnaps Hawkgirl and replaces her with Martian Manhunter, thereby gaining a spy in Superman's League.

On Apokolips, Kalibak hears of Superman's new role as Earth's protector and wishes to test him. He leads a Parademon invasion of Earth, coincidentally during a public relations event at which Superman and Lex Luthor hope to spread their message of public safety. Enraged, Superman kills Kalibak, who taunts him over his failure to save many innocent lives. Batman and Superman's teams band together to fend off the invasion, but all appears lost until Superman vaporizes the Parademons. Though the invasion is stopped at the cost of thousands of lives, Superman, nevertheless, is more popular than ever.

In the wake of the invasion, Superman and Luthor conceive plans to create an enhanced military security force, loyal only to Superman, using drugs created with Kryptonian technology. Robin teleports to Wayne Manor, having secretly taken one of the prototype drugs. He confronts Batman, with Martian Manhunter having followed him. In the ensuing fight, in which Alfred is accidentally injured, Robin deduces Manhunter's identity. In response, Superman reveals Batman's identity as Bruce Wayne despite Batman's efforts to stop him. Superman, Wonder Woman, Green Lantern, and the Flash journey to the Batcave, where Wonder Woman delivers an ultimatum to Batman: stand down, or the League will respond with force. Martian Manhunter confronts Wonder Woman, but Superman kills him with his heat vision.

Learning that Superman's enhancement drug is being manufactured at the Fortress of Solitude, Batman's team raids the Fortress to steal it. As a distraction, military forces engage in a build-up in the Pacific, but Superman is not long fooled by the ruse. Too late, Batman discovers Jonathan and Martha Kent at the Fortress and realizes that, if Superman discovers his team here, he will assume they have come for his parents and will respond with lethal force. Superman arrives, but Captain Atom fights him both on the orders of the Pentagon but also to give Batman's team time to get away—with the exception of Green Arrow, who is separated and trapped inside the Fortress. Wonder Woman slashes Captain Atom's suit with her sword, not realizing that this will render him unable to contain his energy.

Both Superman and Wonder Woman are injured in the ensuing blast, but Superman recovers quickly, now realizing that the US military tried to kill him and believing that Batman's team is trying to do the same. Returning to the Fortress, he confronts Green Arrow, who is with the Kents. After Green Arrow inadvertently injures Jonathan with an arrow, Superman beats him to death, but not before Green Arrow delivers the prototype pill to Batman. The remaining members of Batman's team escape in a costly victory. An enraged Superman confronts Batman at the Batcave, where the Batcomputer is analyzing the pill. The two argue and fight, ending with Superman breaking Batman's back, but not before the analysis is completed, enabling Batman's Resistance to synthesize the drug. Finally, Alfred, who has taken the drug to gain temporary superpowers, intervenes and injures Superman, allowing him to rescue Batman. In the closing, Superman's League, including Luthor, addresses the United Nations, pledging an end to violence, "Whatever the cost."

=== Year Two ===
Year Two features Superman's fight against the Green Lantern Corps and Harley Quinn joining the Insurgency.

Green Arrow's funeral briefly brings together the rifted Justice League, but in its wake the League is more divided than ever. An injured Batman has been relocated to Doctor Fate's tower, which is located outside of space and thus safe from Superman. Oracle has taken charge of his resistance movement, recruiting other heroes (including Harley Quinn) to fight Superman and his supporters. Harley and Black Canary begin an odd friendship, with Harley becoming an unofficial aunt to Connor, son of Black Canary and Green Arrow.

Meanwhile, Superman's League continues its global crackdown under the guise of enforcing order, sending the Flash and Hal Jordan to intimidate Congress into averting a government shutdown. Wonder Woman remains incapacitated on Themyscira. The formation and brutal methods of Superman's security forces, created with the help of Lex Luthor, convinces James Gordon and many members of the Gotham City Police Department to join with Batman's resistance, thanks to Batman's reverse-engineered superpower pills.

En route to Earth, Green Lantern Kyle Rayner is ambushed and killed by Yellow Lanterns led by Sinestro, who joins Superman's regime as his advisor. The Guardians of the Universe dispatch Ganthet and Guy Gardner to investigate the situation on Earth.

At the Fortress of Solitude, Ganthet urges Superman to step down, but negotiations fail when Ganthet admits the Guardians could have prevented Krypton's destruction. Ganthet returns to Oa, convinced Superman must be captured and brought to Oa for trial. Hal Jordan and John Stewart side with Superman and fly to Earth to warn him.

A squadron of Green Lanterns journey to Earth to arrest Superman but are defeated by Sinestro and Yellow Lantern reinforcements. The Green Lanterns yield and, over Sinestro's objections, are taken prisoner. Gardner, covertly observing, confirms Superman's alliance with the Sinestro Corps and warns the Guardians. In response, the Guardians dispatch all available Green Lanterns, including the sentient planet Mogo, to Earth in a final attempt to defeat Superman.

The battle rages on Earth and above it, with the Green Lanterns attacking the Sinestro Corps and Batman's resistance attacking the Hall of Justice. Luthor warns Gordon that Barbara's identity as Oracle has been compromised, and the two teleport to the Watchtower to stop Cyborg from finding the resistance. Gordon defeats Cyborg at the cost of his own life.

Black Canary, out for revenge for Superman's murder of Green Arrow, defeats Superman with the aid of a kryptonite bullet. However, Superman becomes a Yellow Lantern fueled by the fear he instills in others. He kills Black Canary, and then with the collective fear of the live-streamed killing, proceeds to kill Ganthet and Mogo by crashing them both into the Sun. Seeing the tide of the battle turn, Batman orders a retreat.

Gardner and Stewart are killed in the fighting, along with at least a quarter of the Sinestro Corps, and Hal Jordan is forced to become a Yellow Lantern to save Carol Ferris. Black Canary is revealed to have been rescued by Doctor Fate and taken to another universe. Several members of Superman's League are prisoners of the resistance, including the Flash, Cyborg, and Robin. Yet Superman's League continues to rule Earth, and he has proven his willingness to kill on a mass scale to continue doing so.

=== Year Three ===
Year Three introduces magic users such as John Constantine, Zatanna, and Doctor Fate, who aid the Insurgency.

In a flashback, the Teen Titans are present during the explosion that destroyed Metropolis. Kid Flash and Beast Boy are killed, while Superboy, Starfire, Red Robin, and Wonder Girl confront Superman. The remaining Titans battle Superman to stop him from killing any further, but Superman sends them to the Phantom Zone. Shortly after the battle in Year Two, John Constantine learns that his daughter Rose has lost her mother. He takes Rose to the Tower of Fate to keep her safe, vowing revenge against Superman.

In the present, Batman recruits John Constantine, Doctor Occult, and Rose Psychic to take down Raven and Wonder Woman. Raven is defeated, but Occult is killed, and Rose dies after prolonging Wonder Woman's sleep. Having kidnapped Raven, the Insurgency gathers at Jason Blood's home. The Spectre attacks, killing Blood and Harvey Bullock, but the Insurgency escapes to the Tower of Fate with an injured Detective Chimp.

The Spectre forms an alliance with Superman, believing in his cause. Batman and Constantine meet with Madame Xanadu, who prophesies that three new characters will join the fight, others will play bigger roles, and the Joker will return. In Gotham, Constantine and Klarion set a trap for Superman using Raven's body. Ragman ensnares Superman within his shroud, but Shazam arrives to rescue him. In the ensuing battle, the Spectre kills Ragman and Shazam kidnaps Constantine. Deadman finds a way into Shazam's mind and saves Constantine; he also attempts to speak to Jim Corrigan, the Spectre's host, but learns that someone else is controlling the Spectre. The Spectre mortally wounds Deadman, who returns to Nanda Parbat.

Batman and Constantine speak to Swamp Thing, who explains that he supports Superman's regime since it has stopped humanity from destroying the environment. Though Swamp Thing agrees not to harm them, Constantine tells Batman that they will have to kill Swamp Thing. In Nanda Parbat, a dying Boston Brand sends his power to Dick Grayson's spirit. Detective Chimp, now healed through Klarion's power, helps the Insurgency decode Madame Xanadu's prophecy. The Phantom Stranger meets with the Spectre, buying time for the Insurgency to mount another attack. Etrigan the Demon arrives and battles Superman, during which he makes a deal with Batman to replace Jason Blood as his host.

Etrigan forces Superman into a coma, where he dreams of an alternate reality where Lois survived. Batman marries Wonder Woman, Lois becomes President, and her and Superman's daughter Lara is able to truly save the world. In the real world, Wonder Woman is awoken from her sleep through her mother's pact with Hera. Wonder Woman leaves Themyscira and confronts Sinestro. Ares awakens Superman from his eternal sleep, and the latter stops Wonder Woman from killing Sinestro. The Spectre sends Superman and his allies to the Tower of Fate, where they attack the Insurgency. The Insurgency heroes attempt to hold them off, but Sinestro murders Klarion and Detective Chimp.

Constantine summons Trigon, who believes that Superman kidnapped Raven. Meanwhile, the reborn Nightwing infiltrates Arkham Asylum and finds a maniacal Jim Corrigan. Nightwing rendezvouses with Batman and his team as Doctor Fate transports them to the House of Mystery. The Spectre arrives at the Tower of Fate and reveals himself to be Mister Mxyzptlk, hoping to keep Superman as a part of his grand schemes. Mxyzptlk saves Superman from Trigon and transports his allies, along with Trigon, to the House of Mystery. Swamp Thing joins Superman's side, but Nightwing brings in Poison Ivy to stop the creature.

Huntress is killed by Wonder Woman, and the battle between Trigon and Mxyzptlk causes their reality to be distorted. The world begins to slip, and the heroes lose their forms. Constantine releases the Flash, who gets everyone except Swamp Thing to safety; Batman and his team are placed in the House of Mystery, while Superman and his allies are taken to the House of Secrets. Shazam, Nightwing, and Doctor Fate team up to send Trigon and Mxyzptlk to Shazam's void, but Raven awakes and confronts Trigon. Fate's plan works, but he is transported to the void with Trigon and Mxyzptlk.

Zatanna transports the Insurgency to Alaska, where Batman has built an undetectable compound. Batman finds Constantine there with Rose, and realizes that his only goal was to get rid of Trigon. Constantine resigns from the team and takes Rose with him. Meanwhile, Superman, rid of the Yellow Lantern ring, tells his team that their vendetta against Batman is not as important as saving the world.

=== Year Four ===
Year Four introduces the Greek gods, revealing Ares' scheme to empower himself by escalating the conflict between the Regime and the Insurgency into a war by involving his fellow gods alongside enlisting the aid of Darkseid.

Tensions boil between Superman and his allies. Similarly, Batman's teammates are upset with his refusal to continue fighting. A superpowered Renee Montoya goes to Washington, D.C., where she threatens to kill Robin. Superman appears and fights Montoya, but she dies after taking too many of the superpower pills. Bruce Wayne arrives on the scene, and Superman tells him that the war is over. Harley Quinn kidnaps Billy Batson, while Lex Luthor helps Barbara Gordon to become Batgirl once more by administering a treatment that allows her to regain the use of her legs. Meanwhile, Ares and Hera voice their concern to Zeus that Superman has become a god amongst men. Hera sends the armies of Themyscira to the Hall of Justice to end Superman's rule, despite Wonder Woman being Superman's ally.

Batman, who had made an earlier deal with Ares, joins the armies of Themyscira. Wonder Woman proposes a trial by combat between the Gods and Superman's regime. Superman steps forward as the Regime's champion, while Batman chooses Wonder Woman to fight on behalf of the gods. Wonder Woman is forced to do so by Zeus, who claims that Queen Hippolyta will be killed by Hera if Wonder Woman does not honor the will of the gods. Superman and Wonder Woman begin their battle to the death, but Sinestro intervenes and shoots Wonder Woman down. Batman's insurgents and the armies of Themyscira, led by Artemis and Hermes, battle the Regime.

More of the Olympians arrive to defeat the Regime, but Ares frees Billy Batson, who turns into Shazam and joins the fight. Hercules is killed by Superman, so Zeus retaliates by returning to Earth and stripping Shazam of his power. The battle ends, with neither faction the victor. Wonder Woman is forced to side with the Olympians, while Zeus tells the world that they will no longer worship Superman.

Ares is revealed to have been playing both sides. The God of War advises Superman to ally with Poseidon, who is equally angry with Zeus' occupation of Earth. Poseidon threatens to destroy Themyscira, but Wonder Woman protects her people alongside Batman and his remaining insurgents. Superman and Poseidon attack Themyscira, but they are stopped by Aquaman and Mera. As the battle reaches the land, the Flash arrives and helps the Insurgency evacuate the people of Themyscira.

Meanwhile, Billy Batson, Harley Quinn, and Hippolyta are sent to Tartarus. They confront Ares and escape using his Mother Box, but it sends them to Apokolips and they are captured by Darkseid. Superman flies there to rescue them, and it is revealed that Darkseid is working with Ares to avenge his son's death at the hands of Superman. While Superman duels Darkseid, the Gods continue their battle across the Earth. Batman travels to New Genesis to seek help from Highfather, and Orion manages to stop the fight between Superman and Darkseid.

Wonder Woman and the rest of the Justice League battle the Olympians on Themyscira; Hera kills Artemis, but the remaining members of Batman's team assist the Justice League. Nuclear missiles are launched at Themyscira by the United Nations, but Superman returns and throws the missiles into space. As Zeus attempts to kill Superman, he is stopped by the Highfather. The latter convinces Zeus to stop his takeover of Earth, as he is no longer their true god. The Gods return to Olympus, and Zeus gives back Shazam his powers.

Superman hands over a defeated Ares to Darkseid and forcefully disbands the United Nations. After having rounded up and destroying the remaining nuclear weapons, he asks Batman to meet with him in person. Batman, knowing that it is a trap, does not attend. Instead, he speaks to Lex Luthor about recruiting a new team for a final battle against Superman.

=== Year Five ===
Year Five sees a desperate last stand from Batman and Lex Luthor to establish a link to the Prime Universe Justice League and enlist their help to defeat the Regime. The conclusion of Year Five directly leads into the events of the game.

Prior to the occupation of the Olympians, Plastic Man's son Offspring was captured by the Justice League and imprisoned within the Trench. In an attempt to save his son, Plastic Man broke into the Trench and released nearly every prisoner inside. At the end of Year Four, a clone of Superman created by Lex Luthor escaped containment and was found by an elderly tailor who believed him to be Superman.

In the present, Superman orders the Justice League to round up the Green Lanterns, insurgents, and supervillains who were broken out of the Trench. Meanwhile, Hawkman arrives on Earth and tries to forcefully bring Hawkgirl back to Thanagar, but he is easily defeated by the Justice League. Batman recruits the Rogues, consisting of Weather Wizard, Heat Wave, Golden Glider, and Mirror Master. Doomsday comes to Earth and attacks Superman, but Bane defeats him and joins Superman's regime; Superman also kills Parasite by throwing him into the sun. Bane, Killer Frost, and Killer Croc capture Catwoman and torture her for information about Batman's whereabouts.

Batman, Batwoman, Harley Quinn, and Mirror Master confront Bane and Killer Frost at Wayne Manor, allowing Batgirl to rescue Catwoman from Killer Croc. Superman and Wonder Woman attack Batman, but he and the insurgents escape. Catwoman leaves the team after her near-death ordeal. The Rogues mount a coordinated attack on Regime strongholds across the world, but Bizarro intervenes and kills Heat Wave and Weather Wizard. Superman confronts Bizarro during a battle with Solomon Grundy and kills Grundy after he allows Bizarro to escape.

Dick Grayson passes on the Nightwing mantle and suit to Robin, though he does not approve of his allegiance to Superman. An underground movement led by Jason Bard decides to join the Insurgency, but Superman tracks them down and murders them all for invoking the Joker's name. Trickster decides to help Bizarro become a better version of Superman, but Bizarro accidentally kills him along with multiple civilians; Bizarro brings Trickster's body to Lex Luthor, hoping to revive him. Luthor knows that Superman will question his loyalty once he finds out the truth about Bizarro, so he sends the clone to the Fortress of Solitude. Using a brainwashed Doomsday, Luthor virtually attacks Bizarro. Superman arrives and tries to save Bizarro, but Doomsday kills the monster. Hawkman joins Batman's team, and later obtains a kryptonite ring from Mongul.

After being humiliated by Alfred, Superman sends Victor Zsasz to interrogate him. Alfred refuses to give up Batman's location, and he is murdered by Zsasz. Batman comes out of hiding to find Zsasz, though he chooses not to kill him. Nightwing II, Superman, Yellow Lantern, and Wonder Woman battle Batman, but the Flash saves him and gets him to safety. Later, Superman attacks the Flash for his betrayal of the Regime. Superman sends Girder and King Shark to arrest insurgents led by Iris West, prompting the Flash to save her. The Flash accidentally kills King Shark, and after Iris condemns him, the Flash rejoins the Regime.

Batman, Batgirl, and Batwoman attack the Hall of Justice, defeating Hawkgirl and kidnapping Cyborg. Superman arrives to stop them, but he is confronted by Hawkman with a kryptonite mace. A weakened Superman manages to kill Hawkman before passing out from kryptonite poisoning. Hacking into Cyborg's database, Batman's team finds evidence of Superman murdering Bard and his underground movement. They attempt to broadcast it to the world, but Raven causes a massive blackout and the video is lost. Batman meets with Lex Luthor and tells him about a Kryptonite weapon that can only be unlocked with the DNA of the Justice League members. Luthor reveals his plan to get parallel versions of the Justice League from alternate Earths using Speed Force energy and a Mother Box.

Deathstroke breaks into a Regime armory to steal the Mother Box, but after killing Metamorpho, he is captured by Raven and Cyborg. It is revealed that Deathstroke uploaded the schematics of the Mother Box to Luthor, allowing him and Batman to complete their device.

In the Prime DC Universe, none of the events of Year One have occurred. Lex Luthor, Doomsday, Sinestro, Catwoman, Deathstroke, Black Adam, Bane, and Ares attack the Justice League while the Joker and Harley Quinn arm a nuclear weapon in Metropolis. As the Justice League tries to stop the Joker, they all suddenly disappear.

In the Injustice universe, Catwoman reveals Batman's location to Superman in an attempt to stop the war. Batman and Batgirl watch the Prime Universe, Superman, Wonder Woman, and Yellow Lantern strike. Batwoman sacrifices herself and activates the device, scattering the Regime and the Insurgency across the globe. As the series ends, Batman and the Joker from the Prime Universe find themselves in the new world's Metropolis.

=== Ground Zero ===
Ground Zero retells the story of the video game from Harley Quinn's perspective.

While leading the Joker Clan, a rebel organization named after the Joker, Harley stages a raid on a Regime factory that manufactures the Regime's super-powered pills so as to replenish the group's dwindling supplies but were attacked by Man-Bat. Swallowing half of one of the pills, Harley defeats him and breaks open the vault supposedly containing a batch of the super pills but finds it empty, having found out that the factory had ceased production. Harley blows up the factory as she makes her escape.

Later, she and the Joker Clan went to aid a peaceful protest against the Regime when it was violently attacked by Sinestro, who was then attacked himself by the Justice League's Prime Universe variants. As Harley and her group fights back Regime soldiers while protecting the protesters, one of the clan members, called "Gary" by Harley, was wounded by a lone Regime trooper, causing Harley to beat him down in a rage. She was hailed as a hero by the protestors as the Prime variants of Wonder Woman, Green Lantern and Green Arrow defeated Sinestro right before Yellow Lantern enters the fray.

As Gary's wound was tended to, Harley witnesses the arrest of the Prime Universe Batman by Yellow Lantern and Hawkgirl, and was left shocked to also see Prime Joker. Believing him to be an impersonator, Harley personally battles him only to be defeated herself. Now believing him to be her Joker, Harley was immediately charmed and she takes him to Arkham Asylum so he could lead the Joker Clan against Superman. However, some members of the clan express deep discomfort with having to now work for the Joker and attempts to kill him.

The attempted assassination was thwarted when Arkham came under attack by Hawkgirl and Nightwing II. As the Joker fights Hawkgirl, the rebelling clan members attempted to talk sense into Harley but it falls on deaf ears, for she is still under the Joker's charm and filled with the delusion that he is her Joker alive again.

Eventually, the Prime Justice League and Batman arrived to aid Harley and the Joker Clan, forcing Hawkgirl and Nightwing to retreat.

Though she was ordered to remain low, Harley secretly watches the Joker being physically confronted by Batman as some clan members convinces her to leave. Snapping back to her senses, Harley attempts to recruit other villains to join with the clan, such as Captain Boomerang and Poison Ivy but they declined.

She and some of her men goes to track down Killer Croc, who had been kidnapping criminals and holding them prisoner in his lair for Superman. She takes down Croc's men only to be confronted by Killer Croc himself and Bane before she could free the prisoners. Initially overpowered and despite the fight proving difficult, due to Croc's size and immense strength, Harley ultimately prevails and takes him down through her acrobatic and maneuver skills. She then goes to free the prisoners (amongst being Mr. Freeze and Katana, who helps her take down Bane.

Weary of having to follow Batman's order to lay low and being temporarily forbidden to partake in any of the Insurgency's missions, Harley decides to take matters into her own hands and go to Wayne Manor so she could fetch the Batmobile. During a battle with Shazam, she cleverly taunts him into saying his name, magically reverting him back into Billy Batson, and she knocks him out with sleeping gas, allowing the Joker Clan to take him captive. Right at that moment, Green Arrow disables the shield surrounding Wayne Manor, allowing both the Justice League and Harley's group to access the mansion, separately.

After some difficulty, Harley and the clan managed to reach the Batcave, following a reencounter with Man-Bat, who reluctantly helped them. While the Justice League were battling Killer Frost and Solomon Grundy, Harley reaches the Batcave only to get into another confrontation with Nightwing. She manages to disarm him and starts pummeling him, prompting one of her men to stop her before she could commit murder. Harley drives the Batmobile out of the Batcave, taking Batson with her but left her men behind.

As she drove through Gotham, Black Adam intercepts her, as he mistook her for Batman. Though Harley took another super pill to fight him, Black Adam proved to be more than a match for her, and though the Joker Clan came to her aid, they were all overpowered until Billy regains his powers and intervenes, saving Harley. She returns to the Batcave, after learning Batman was there but he had already left when she got here. Filled with regret for falling for the Joker, she calls Ivy to inform her of her plan and she was told that Batman has kept the Joker in a secret safe house in the Hall of Justice.

Slipping past Cyborg and his alternate variant as they fought and later as Deathstroke overrides the Watchtower's nuclear reactor, Harley teleports to the Joker's cell using the teleport codes Ivy had provided. Before she could kill him, Batman suddenly calls to summon her and the Joker Clan to Stryker's Island. The Joker charms Harley again into releasing and helping him escape, despite her attempt to resist.

She takes him to the Tower of Fate so he could rescue his other self and unleash as much chaos as they could. As Zatanna confronts Harley for bringing the Joker to the tower he ambushes her until Doctor Fate appears. Sensing Harley's wish to free herself from the Joker, he nonetheless refused to help her, stating that the two are bound forever and that it is pointless to escape from it. He then kicks them out of the tower, transporting back to the Joker Clan.

As the Justice League battles the One Earth Regime, the Joker rallies the Joker Clan to his side but some of the members from earlier openly expressed their refusal to join him and prefer following Harley instead, provoking the Joker to ruthlessly beat them. He would have killed one of them hadn't Harley stopped him. Joker tries to convince her to turn against them but she refuses and knocks him down to give them time to escape. Amidst a tense standoff, she finds that the other clan members are now under the Joker's control and despite fending them off, the Joker ultimately overpowers her into submission.

While the Joker Clan rampages through Gotham, Joker captures the defected clan members to sadistically torment Harley. As he threatens to kill one of them, "Gary", whose actual name is Curt, intervenes only to be fatally stabbed, to Harley's horror. Joker then forcefully takes her with him to begin his plan and she had no choice but to go along with it. Noticing Lex Luthor flying in the distance, Joker knocks him out of the air and has Harley kill him and take his suit. Lex defeats her, however. Annoyed, the Joker attempts to kill Harley, now fully showing his true colors, but Lex subdues him. Infuriated by the attempt on her life, Harley beats the Joker until Lex convinces her to stand down. After firing the clan members that betrayed her, she announces that she'll be rebranding the Joker Clan.

Mourning Gary's death, Harley beats the now-captive Joker to a bloody pulp with her hammer as revenge for the torment he had put her through and finds that her friends had renamed themselves as "The Harley Horde", to her delight.

Leading her new group, Harley subdues the other members of the Joker Clan and rescues several people they were holding captive. While a funeral for Gary was being held, Poison Ivy arrives and conjures more flowers for him. Harley shows her the captive Joker and Ivy express surprise that she didn't kill him but yet Harley still felt good over it, despite her earlier plan. Ivy plans for them to settle down until the war is over, but Harley declines, insisting that the Harley Horde needs her.

Arming themselves with highly-advanced weaponry and riding high-tech vehicles, the group protects Metropolis and the people as Superman and the Regime clashed with the Insurgency and the Justice League while laying waste to the city with Doomsday, whom Harley attacks to save Prime Superman. Returning to Prime Joker, she beats him to unconsciousness so she could have a measure of closure. After the Regime was defeated and Superman and its members imprisoned, Harley hands the Joker over to Prime Batman so he could take him back to the Prime Universe.

In the end, it was revealed that Harley had travelled to the Prime Universe herself with Ivy and had been recapping the events to her Prime counterpart, who was left unsure on what do with the nuke her Joker attempted to use, but Harley destroys the detonator and takes her with her and Ivy for a day of fun.

=== Injustice 2 (comics) ===
The comics based on Injustice 2 take place between the events of Injustice: Gods Among Us and Injustice 2. In the aftermath of Superman's defeat and the One Earth Regime's collapse, the story follows Batman and his allies' efforts to rebuild society, Ra's al Ghul's rise to power and his plans to save the world from ecological destruction, Hal Jordan's redemption after abandoning the Regime, and Gorilla Grodd seizing control of Gorilla City.

=== Injustice vs. Masters of the Universe ===
Injustice vs. Masters of the Universe is a comic miniseries that serves as a crossover with the Masters of the Universe franchise. The story continues from Injustice 2's "Absolute Power" ending, wherein Superman re-established the Regime and mentally enslaved Batman. The remaining Insurgents find He-Man in hopes that he might stop Superman permanently, while Superman attempts to employ Skeletor to restore his family to life. He then searches the multiverse to find a reality where they still live, only to learn that fate will not allow them to do so in any reality. After a clash with He-Man, Superman receives a fatal blast of lightning from He-Man and Castle Greyskull, then, in a redemptive moment with He-Man, dies. Batman, freed from the mind-control after witnessing Damian Wayne's sacrifice, forms a new Justice League in his son's honor.

== Publication history ==
The series was announced by Ed Boon on October 5, 2012, at the EB Games Expo. The first issue was released digitally on January 15, 2013, by writer Tom Taylor and artist Jheremy Raapack, and subsequent issues were released weekly. The digital issues were later collected and issued in monthly print comic book form, and eventually in collected editions. In December 2014, Taylor announced that he would be leaving the series after writing Injustice: Gods Among Us – Year Three digital issue #14 (print issue #7), with Brian Buccellato replacing him by continuing the story into Year Four and Five. The final digital issue of the series was released on September 20, 2016, stopping right before the plot of the Injustice: Gods Among Us video game.

=== Sequels and spin-offs ===
Another comic book series, titled Injustice: Ground Zero, followed the Injustice comic prequel. This series was a retelling of the game's events from Harley Quinn's perspective.

Taylor and Bruno Redondo returned as the writer and artist, respectively, for the sequel comic book series Injustice 2, which began publication in May 2017. The series takes place between the events of the first game and its sequel, Injustice 2.

A miniseries known as Injustice vs. Masters of the Universe, featuring a crossover with the Masters of the Universe franchise, was first published on July 18, 2018, by DC Comics. It is written by Tim Seeley with art by Freddie Williams II, and follows the second game's alternate ending, where Superman wins out over Batman.

Injustice: Year Zero was released in 2020.

== Reception ==
=== Critical ===
The series was well received by critics. According to review aggregator Comic Book Roundup, Year One as a whole scored an average of 8.6/10 based on 115 reviews, Year Two averaged 8.4/10 based on 115 reviews, Year Three averaged 8.3/10 based on 122 reviews, Year Four averaged 7.4/10 based on 77 reviews, and Year Five averaged 8.1/10 based on 134 reviews. Ground Zero scored an average of 7.6/10 based on 54 reviews, and Year Zero as a whole scored an average of 8.7/10 based on 21 reviews.

=== Accolades ===
- 2013 IGN People's Choice Award for Best Digital Comic Series
- 2014 IGN Best Digital Comic Series
- 2014 IGN People's Choice Award for Best Digital Comic Series

== Collected editions ==
The Injustice: Gods Among Us series is collected in several trade paperbacks and hardcovers.

| Title | Material collected | Publication date | ISBN |
|---|---|---|---|
| Injustice: Gods Among Us Vol. 1 | Injustice: Gods Among Us #1–6 | November 13, 2013 | 978-1-40124-500-9 |
| Injustice: Gods Among Us Vol. 2 | Injustice: Gods Among Us #7–12, Annual #1 | June 25, 2014 | 978-1-40124-601-3 |
| Injustice: Gods Among Us: Year One – The Complete Collection | Injustice: Gods Among Us #1–12, Annual #1 | March 8, 2016 | 978-1401262792 |
| Injustice: Gods Among Us: Year Two Vol. 1 | Injustice: Gods Among Us: Year Two #1–6 | October 1, 2014 | 978-1-40125-340-0 |
| Injustice: Gods Among Us: Year Two Vol. 2 | Injustice: Gods Among Us: Year Two #7–12, Annual #1 | Apr 15 2015 | 978-1-40125-341-7 |
| Injustice: Gods Among Us: Year Two – The Complete Collection | Injustice: Gods Among Us: Year Two #1–12, Annual #1 | January 17, 2017 | 978-140126-5601 |
| Injustice: Gods Among Us: Year Three Vol. 1 | Injustice: Gods Among Us: Year Three #1–7 | October 28, 2015 | 978-1-40126-314-0 |
| Injustice: Gods Among Us: Year Three Vol. 2 | Injustice: Gods Among Us: Year Three #8–12, Annual #1 | February 10, 2016 | 978-1-40126-129-0 |
| Injustice: Gods Among Us Year Three – The Complete Collection | Injustice: Gods Among Us: Year Three #1–12, Annual #1 | January 16, 2018 | 978-1401275242 |
| Injustice: Gods Among Us: Year Four Vol. 1 | Injustice: Gods Among Us: Year Four #1–6 | April 27, 2016 | 978-1-40126-267-9 |
| Injustice: Gods Among Us: Year Four Vol. 2 | Injustice: Gods Among Us: Year Four #7–12, Annual #1 | August 17, 2016 | 978-1-40126-737-7 |
| Injustice: Gods Among Us: Year Four – The Complete Collection | Injustice: Gods Among Us: Year Four #1–12, Annual #1 | January 15, 2019 | 978-1401285807 |
| Injustice: Gods Among Us: Year Five Vol. 1 | Injustice: Gods Among Us: Year Five #1–7 | December 7, 2016 | 978-1-40126-768-1 |
| Injustice: Gods Among Us: Year Five Vol. 2 | Injustice: Gods Among Us: Year Five #8–14 | February 22, 2017 | 978-1-40127-247-0 |
| Injustice: Gods Among Us: Year Five Vol. 3 | Injustice: Gods Among Us: Year Five #15–20, Annual #1 | June 7, 2017 | 978-1-40127-246-3 |
| Injustice: Gods Among Us: Year Five – The Complete Collection | Injustice: Gods Among Us: Year Five #1–20, Annual #1 | January 14, 2020 | 978-1401295660 |
| Injustice: Ground Zero Vol. 1 | Injustice: Ground Zero #1–6 | July 11, 2017 | 978-1401272937 |
| Injustice: Ground Zero Vol. 2 | Injustice: Ground Zero #7–12 | October 3, 2017 | 978-1401273880 |
| Injustice 2 Vol. 1 | Injustice 2 #1–6 | October 31, 2017 | 978-1401274412 |
| Injustice 2 Vol. 2 | Injustice 2 #7–12, #14 | May 1, 2018 | 978-1401278410 |
| Injustice 2 Vol. 3 | Injustice 2 #13, 15–17, Annual #1 | August 7, 2018 | 978-1401280291 |
| Injustice 2 Vol. 4 | Injustice 2 #18–24 | December 11, 2018 | 978-1401285333 |
| Injustice 2 Vol. 5 | Injustice 2 #25–30 | April 30, 2019 | 978-1401289164 |
| Injustice 2 Vol. 6 | Injustice 2 #31–36, Annual #2 | August 6, 2019 | 978-1401292270 |
| Injustice vs. Masters of the Universe | Injustice vs. Masters of the Universe #1–6 | April 23, 2019 | 978-1401288372 |
| Injustice Year Zero | Injustice Year Zero #1–14 | July 13, 2021 | 978-1779511294 |
| Injustice: Gods Among Us Omnibus Vol. 1 | Injustice: Gods Among Us #1–12, Annual #1, Injustice: Gods Among Us: Year Two #1–12, Annual #1, Injustice: Gods Among Us: Year Three #1–12, Annual #1 | December 10, 2019 | 978-1401294984 |
| Injustice: Gods Among Us Omnibus Vol. 2 | Injustice: Gods Among Us: Year Four #1–12, Annual #1, Injustice: Gods Among Us: Year Five #1–20, Annual #1, Injustice: Ground Zero #1–12 | February 8, 2021 | 978-1779504685 |
| Injustice 2 Omnibus | Injustice 2 #1-36 Injustice 2 Annual #1-2 | May 27, 2025 | 978-1799501466 |

== In other media ==
=== Television ===
The character of Lara Kent, renamed Lane Lane, appears in My Adventures with Superman, voiced by Jolie Hoang-Rappaport. This version comes from a dystopian future along with her brother Jonathan Lane to kill Lex Luthor before he releases his army of Eradicators and uses them to take over he world.

=== Film ===
An animated Injustice film was released on October 19, 2021, as part of the DC Universe Animated Original Movies line. The film partially adapts the Year One storyline from the comics while presenting an original narrative that diverges from the source material in several ways.
