= Mick Miller =

Mick Miller may refer to:

- Mick Miller (Aboriginal statesman) (1937–1998), Australian political activist
- Mick Miller (comedian) (born 1950), British comedian
- Mick Miller (cricketer) (born 1979), Australian cricketer
- Mick Miller (police officer) (born 1926), Australian police officer

== See also ==
- Mick the Miller (1926–1939), greyhound
- Miller (surname)
- Michael Miller (disambiguation)
- Mac Miller (1992–2018), American rapper, singer, and record producer
- Mack Miller (disambiguation)
- Miller (surname)
- Mick (disambiguation)
