= Mack Miller (disambiguation) =

Mack or Mac Miller may refer to:

== People ==
- Mac Miller (1992–2018; born Malcolm James McCormick) U.S. rapper
- Mack Miller (1931–2020; born Andrew Markley Miller), American cross-country skier and trainer
- Mack Miller (born 1955) U.S. singer, member of The Chi-Lites
- MacKenzie Miller aka "Mack" (1921–2010; born MacKenzie Todd Miller) U.S. horsetrainer

== Fictional characters ==
- Mack Miller (played by Glen Corbett), from the 1950 U.S. drama film The Fireball.
- Mack Miller (played by Raymond McKee), from the 1926 U.S. silent film Exclusive Rights (film)

== Business ==
- Mack, Miller Candle Company, a formerly prominent candle company, when industrial candle making was the industry of Syracuse, NYS, USA; see History of candle making

== See also ==
- Miller (surname)
- List of people with surname Miller
- Max Miller (disambiguation)
- Mick Miller (disambiguation)
- Miller (surname)
