= Saru no Gundan =

Japanese science fiction series

Saru no Gundan (SFドラマ 猿の軍団 (Note: エスエフドラマ さるのぐんだん; Esuefu Dorama Saru no Gundan); Army of the Apes (Note: SF Drama: Army of the Apes)) is a 1974 Japanese science fiction television series, that ran on the Tokyo Broadcasting System, from 6 October 1974 to 30 March 1975. Consisting of twenty-six half-hour episodes, the series capitalised on the success of Pierre Boulle's 1963 novel La Planète des singes, which was known in English as Planet of the Apes, and the film and television franchise. Beyond the basic plotline of a futuristic Earth ruled by apes, Saru no Gundan takes nothing from the Planet of the Apes franchise.

== Summary ==
Jirō and Yurika visit the institute where cryogenic experiments are being conducted by Jirō's uncle Sakaki Sumiko and his assistant Izumi Kazuko. They witness a monkey being unfrozen. Jirō climbs into one of the cryogenic chambers but a volcanic eruption causes an earthquake which seals him in. As the building is falling apart, the lab assistant, Izumi, places Yurika in a cryogenic chamber to protect her, then enters one herself. Falling debris activates the chambers, so the woman and two children are frozen. The earthquake buries the lab under tons of rock, but the steel capsules survive. In the year 3714, the three capsules are dug up and they are defrosted. Their occupants are horrified to find themselves in a world of intelligent apes that walk upright like men, speak, wear clothing and have weapons. Along the way, they befriend an ape child named Pepe and a human being named Gōdo, as each try to evade the forces of Police Chief Gebā and that of Sabo, the Minister (the Commander in Time of the Apes). Amidst a coup led by Commissioner Ruza, Jirō, Yurika, Izumi and Gōdo eventually discover Yukomu (EUC COM in Time of the Apes), the super computer that was built by mankind in 2030, but eventually chose to instigate its demise in favour of the apes. Yukomu will not allow them to remain, and offers them a choice of being transported further on into time or to another planet. In the event, Gōdo is sent to another world, while Jirō, Yurika, and Izumi are returned to 1974.

== Cast ==
- Reiko Tokunaga as Kazuko Izumi / Catherine
- Hiroko Saito as Yurika / Caroline
- Masaaki Kaji as Jirō Sakaki / Johnny
- Tetsuya Ushio as Gōdo
- Baku Hatakeyama as Gebā
- Kazue Takita as Pepe
  - Kouko Kagawa as the voice of Pepe
- Hitoshi Omae as Bippu
- Noboru Nakaya as Dr. Takagi

== Production ==
The series was a co-production of Tsuburaya Productions and Tokyo Broadcasting System. It was developed by Keiichi Abe and directed by Kiyosumi Fukazawa, with music by Toshiaki Tsushima.

== Time of the Apes ==
In 1987, television producer Sandy Frank edited together several episodes of the series, including the first and last episodes, into a 94-minute feature version called Time of the Apes. Syndicated to broadcast and cable outlets, this compilation film was also released on VHS by Celebrity Home Entertainment's Just for Kids Home Video in mid-1988.

The movie was featured twice on Mystery Science Theater 3000, originally on KTMA in 1989, and then later as episode six of season three in 1991 on Comedy Central.
