= Rickety Rocket =

- Voices of: Al Fann; Bobby F. Ellerbee; Johnny Brown; John Anthony Bailey; Dee Timberlake
- Country of origin: United States
- Original language: English
- No. of series: 1
- No. of episodes: 16

Production
- Production company: Ruby-Spears Productions

Original release
- Network: ABC
- Release: September 22, 1979 – January 5, 1980

Rickety Rocket is an animated television series, produced by Ruby-Spears Productions, which ran from 1979 to 1980 as a segment on The Plastic Man Comedy/Adventure Show.

== Plot ==
In the far future, four African-American teenagers named Sunstroke (voiced by John Anthony Bailey), Splashdown (voiced by Johnny Brown), Cosmo (voiced by Bobby F. Ellerby), and Venus (voiced by Dee Timberlake) build a makeshift sentient talking rocket (voiced by Al Fann). They run the Far Out Detective Agency and solve mysteries that usually has them fighting suspects operating as master criminals or disguised as monsters. The rocket's signature phrase was "Rickety Rocket, blast off!"

== Episodes ==
No.	Title	Original release date
1	"The Case of the Zombie Monster"	September 22, 1979
The Far-Out Detective Agency is called out to a residential satellite and meet an heiress who has found a riddle to a hidden fortune. It won't be easy when a monster that turns people into zombies is on the loose.
2	"The Mysterious Robot Critic Caper"	September 29, 1979
A series of mystifying thefts of museum collections is committed by a robotic gentleman as his cane has a matter transformer that can shrink the stolen objects and store it in his cane.
3	"The Spaceship Caper"	October 6, 1979
A space pirate called the Cosmic Claw is using his laser-projected "cosmic claws" to hijack space transports that are carrying gold. He also targets the sight of a pageant that Venus is entered into.
4	"The Golden Crystal Caper"	October 13, 1979
The Far-Out Detective Agency is assigned to transport a priceless golden crystal from Mars to Hong Kong. Unfortunately, it is targeted by a jewel thief called Lazer-Lips whose lips can emit a laser beam that immobilizes anyone that touches it.
5	"The Rickety Robbery"	October 20, 1979
The Far-Out Detective Agency is tricked into intercepting the delivery of a cosmic crown and handing it to "Officer" Nimbus (who is actually the faceless Mr. Eclipse). When Venus, Splashdown, and Sunstroke are arrested for the theft, Cosmo and Rickety must track down the thief while evading the Hood (who was hired by Mr. Eclipse).
6	"The Alien Egg Caper"	October 27, 1979
An alien egg hatches and makes off with the members of an explorer's club.
7	"The Super-Duper Race Cage"	November 3, 1979
Helmet Head steals a top-secret formula for a super fuel.
8	"The Creepy Creature Caper"	November 10, 1979
A crippled spaceship loaded with counterfeit money lands in the swamp. When the Far-Out Detective Agency investigates, they encounter the local swamp monster.
9	"The Mysterious, Serious Circus Caper"	November 17, 1979
A traveling intergalactic circus is haunted by the ghost of a space warrior.
10	"The Mad Mummy Mystery"	November 24, 1979
The Far-Out Detective Agency is kidnapped while transporting an alien mummy to a local university.
11	"The Count Draculon Caper"	December 1, 1979
A space vampire named Count Draculon hijacks rocket liners using a Hypno-Beam that turns the passengers and crew members into zombies.
12	"The Horrible Headless Horseman Caper"	December 8, 1979
A ghost town holds the evidence that will convict an unknown Vice-President of Pegasus Corporation and the Far-Out Detective Agency is sent to retrieve it while evading the robotic Headless Horseman.
13	"The Case of the Fearsome Phantom"	December 15, 1979
A phantom organist threatens revenge against the rock group The Astros for stealing his music.
14	"The Mysterious Warnings of Doom"	December 22, 1979
The Far-Out Detective Agency vacations at a gold-mining asteroid turned vacation resort until a giant alien called Zarcon orders the planet to evacuate even when he sends three alien monsters to scare away the inhabitants.
15	"The Case of the Vicious Voodoo Villain"	December 29, 1979
A tropical alien resort becomes a nightmare when an alien creature uses a voodoo machine to turn the island's citizens into monsters.
16	"The Deep Sea Demon Caper"	January 5, 1980
A valuable cargo of gold lies submerged in the waters off the coast of Greece. When a giant sea monster prevents a salvaging company from recovering it, the Far-Out Detective Agency comes to their aid.
