= Lynx (comics) =

Lynx is the name of three fictional characters appearing in DC Comics.

== Fictional character biographies ==
=== Dome's Henchman ===
The first Lynx is a henchman of Doctor Dome, an enemy of Plastic Man.

=== Ghost Dragons ===
Lynx

Publication information
- Publisher: DC Comics
- First appearance: Robin #1 (1991)
- Created by: Chuck Dixon (writer); Tom Lyle (artist)

In-story information
- Alter ego: Ling
- Team affiliations: The Ghost Dragons
- Abilities: Excellent martial artist

Ling is the girlfriend of Billy Hue, leader of the Chinese gang the Ghost Dragons. Hue fails to kill Clyde Rawlins, an American interfering in the affairs of Ghost Dragons leader King Snake, due to Robin's interference. Hue is killed by King Snake as punishment, and Ling is dubbed Lynx and given leadership of the Ghost Dragons in his When Lynx fails to kill Robin, King Snake moved the Ghost Dragons to Gotham City and takes out one of Lynx's eyes as punishment.

The Ghost Dragons gradually begin taking territory in Gotham, with Lynx at their head and King Snake working from the shadows. Lynx is part of a gang war between the Ghost Dragons and the Russian Odessa, leading her into conflict with Robin and Huntress. After King Snake killed a member of the Triads (an act she considered highly foolish), Lynx leads a revolt against him. King Snake is arrested, and Lynx becomes the sole leader of the Ghost Dragons.

When Gotham is declared a No Man's Land, the Ghost Dragons controlled a part of the city. Eventually, Lynx is approached by Batman, who works with her to stop a child slavery operation.

During the "Batman: War Crimes" storyline, Lynx attempts to expand the Ghost Dragons' territory, and came into conflict with Batgirl (Cassandra Cain). When Lynx proves unable to best Batgirl in combat, one of the Ghost Dragon members attempts to interfere in the fight, accidentally killing Lynx.

During the "One Year Later" storyline, Lynx is resurrected by members of the League of Assassins, only to be killed by Batgirl soon after.

=== Third Lynx ===
The third Lynx.

In the "Battle for the Cowl" storyline, a new Lynx is recruited by Black Mask to be part of a group of villains that aim to take over Gotham. She is seen fighting with Man-Bat against gang members in Battle for the Cowl #1, and is also seen with other Gotham-based heroes in the third issue.

She later appears in Red Robin. After being captured and unmasked by Red Robin, Lynx reveals that she is a teenager and claims to be an undercover officer from Hong Kong. After receiving intel from Cassandra Cain that indicates that the Hong Kong Police Department is indeed using teenagers for undercover operations, Red Robin frees Lynx from prison. Before departing into the night, Lynx kisses Red Robin, which causes him to realize that there is an attraction between them.

== Powers and abilities ==
Lynx is a master of martial arts and trained in the use of guns and hand-to-hand weapons.

== In other media ==
Lynx appears in the 2024 comic miniseries Little Batman: Month One, which takes place between the events of Merry Little Batman and Bat-Fam.

== See also ==
- List of Batman family enemies
