= Woozy Winks =

- Woozy Winks as depicted in Plastic Man #17 (May 1949); art by Jack Cole.

Publication information
- Publisher: Quality Comics; DC Comics
- First appearance: Police Comics #13 (November 1942)
- Created by: Jack Cole

In-story information
- Full name: Wolfgang Winks
- Partnerships: Plastic Man

Wolfgang "Woozy" Winks is a character appearing in comic books published by Quality Comics, and later DC Comics. He is the comic relief sidekick to the superhero Plastic Man. The character first appeared in Police Comics #13 (November 1942). Wolfgang "Woozy" Winks has appeared as an on-again, off-again sidekick to Plastic Man ever since.

The character has been called the "apotheosis" of theatrical buffoons, an archetype that has existed since medieval years. In Icons of the American Comic Book: From Captain America to Wonder Woman, Winks is named one of the "most unique" [sic] sidekicks in comics; the authors note that his portly shape and bumbling idiocy allowed for more comedy in Plastic Man stories.

== Fictional character biography ==
Woozy Winks is a bumbling, inept, overweight and slobbish man who served primarily as comic relief, much like other golden age sidekicks such as Doiby Dickles. In his first appearance, Woozy is a small-time crook; after saving a wizard from drowning, he is rewarded with a "superpower" by the wizard, causing the forces of nature to protect him whenever he is in danger. Later stories would ignore this ability, and Woozy simply became Plastic Man's inept assistant. His personality was based on the comedy of Lou Costello, and his appearance was loosely based on Hugh Herbert.

Although a comic figure in both appearance and aptitude, Woozy does have his heroic moments. Woozy can seemingly recognize perpetrators on sight and recall their arrest history; he also offers sage opinion (occasionally by accident) on finding and trapping criminals, such as noticing a scene's tire track resembles a suspect's tread design. Winks can also hold his own in a fist fight, sometimes taking on several opponents.

One history of Woozy, which appeared in the Plastic Man Special in 1999, gave him an alternative origin. In this version, he was an extremely competent and intelligent agent known as "Green Cobra" whose only oddities were his dress-sense and a tendency to steal office supplies. After being paired together for the first time, he was trapped in a poorly ventilated locker with a wounded Plastic Man; fumes from Plastic Man's blood, which was similar in composition to airplane glue, damaged Woozy's. This backstory contradicted his Golden Age and modern origins backstories where he is depicted as having always been dimwitted.

== In other media ==
- Woozy Winks appears in Batman: The Brave and the Bold, voiced by Stephen Root.
- Woozy Winks appears in a photograph depicted in the DC Nation Shorts: Plastic Man episode "Untouchable".
