= Mighty Man and Yukk =

Animated series created by Ruby-Spears Productions

Mighty Man & Yukk is an animated series created by Ruby-Spears Productions. It aired as part of the 1980–81 show The Plastic Man Comedy/Adventure Show. It was considered as a Ruby-Spears "original" and did not crossover with the other segments of the show.

== Synopsis ==
Millionaire Brandon Brewster (voiced by Peter Cullen) uses a machine to reduce himself to only a few inches in height and give himself superpowers, including super-strength and flight; in this form, he is the costumed crime fighter Mighty Man. His partner is Yukk (voiced by Frank Welker), the "world's ugliest dog"; this anthropomorphic dog conceals his face by wearing a miniature doghouse on his head. The sight of his face destroys anything Yukk looks at. Mighty Man and Yukk are called in by the unnamed Mayor (voiced by John Stephenson) of the unnamed city to fight different supervillains.

The series has strong resemblance to other Ruby-Spears creations at Hanna-Barbera Productions, such as Dynomutt, Dog Wonder.

== Cast ==
=== Main ===
- Peter Cullen as Brandon Brewster/Mighty Man
- John Stephenson as Mayor, Anthead, Big Mouse, Magnet Man, Catman, Dr. Rufus T. Gadgets, Marble Man, Mr. Van Pire, Dr. Lash, Clyde
- Frank Welker as Yukk

=== Additional voices ===
- Michael Bell as Krime Klown, Nefario
- Henry Corden as Goldteeth, Kragg the Conqueror
- Casey Kasem as Beach Bum
- Allan Melvin as Coach Crime/Dee Gooder, Sanfon Vulch, Camera Man
- Alan Oppenheimer as Time Keeper
- Fred Travalena as Baby Man
- Janet Waldo as Ms Make-up, Paulette, Evila the Witch
- William Woodson as Miro the Mentalist

== Episodes ==
No.	Title	Original release date
1	"Big Mouse the Bad Mouse/Magnet Man"	22 September 1979
Big Mouse the Bad Mouse: Big Mouse and his rodent followers plan to hijack a rocket and steal the city mint Magnet Man: Magnet Man threatens to use his giant magnet to pull the city into the river unless he is paid a very big ransom.
2	"Anthead/Never Retire with Mr. & Mrs. Van Pire"	29 September 1979
Anthead: To pull off the crime of the century, Anthead steals computers to help him plan one. Never Retire with Mr. & Mrs. Van Pire: Mr. and Mrs. Van Pire are hypnotizing millionaires to sell them their fortunes and then turning them into bats.
3	"Goldteeth's Bad Bite/Baby Man"	6 October 1979
Goldteeth's Bad Bite: Goldteeth and his sidekick Doctor Decay plan to steal a gold plated satellite that is orbiting outer space. Baby Man: Baby Man and his nanny henchwomen are making City officials act like babies by spraying them with a secret formula.
4	"Trouble Brews When Glue Man Glues/Shake Up with Ms. Make-Up"	13 October 1979
Trouble Brews When Glue Man Glues: Sick of being beaten by Mighty Man and Yukk, the villainous Glue Man hatches a plan to steal chemicals that will create a formula to turn himself into Super-Glue Man upon obtaining a scientist named Dr. Stickol. Shake Up with Ms. Make-Up: Miss Make-Up, the most beautiful criminal that ever lived, plans to steal a scroll that contains Cleopatra's beauty secrets.
5	"Bad News Snooze/Coach Crime's Big Play"	20 October 1979
Bad News Snooze: Madame Sleep and her henchmen Lazy and Tired steal King Ledus' ring. She plans to use the ring which is a key to unlock the vault at the Lagovian Embassy, steal the Lagovian Lion Statue and hold it for a ransom of $10 million. Coach Crime's Big Play: To infiltrate Coach Crime's gang of thieves and figure out who his real identity is, Mighty Man and Yukk pose as safecrackers.
6	"Public Rooster #1/Rob Around the Clock"	27 October 1979
Public Rooster #1: The Rooster steals an anti-gravity machine which he uses to commit numerous dastardly crimes in order to make himself Public Enemy #1. Rob Around the Clock: The Time Keeper and his henchmen Minute Man and Second Hand Rose are freezing time. They then commit crimes resulting in an unstoppable crime spree.
7	"The Perils of Paulette/The Dangerous Dr. Gadgets"	3 November 1979
The Perils of Paulette: The maniacal Handhead tries to force a movie studio to replace their actress Paulette with his girlfriend Billie by sabotaging their latest movie. The Dangerous Dr. Gadgets: In a plot to discredit Mighty Man and Yukk, Dr. Rufus T. Gadgets sets up his own crimes so that he can be the hero of the city.
8	"Bye Bye Biplane/Beach Bum's Crime Wave"	10 November 1979
Baron Brute steals an amnesia machine and plans to use it to win a space shuttle contract by sabotaging his opponent. Beach Bum's Crime Wave: Mighty Man and Yukk encounter Beach Bum, a villain who uses his surfing talents and advanced technology to steal anything valuable including King Neptune's golden trident.
9	"The Fiendish Fishface/Catman"	17 November 1979
The Fiendish Fishface: Fishface uses his trained dolphins to capture millionaires on their yachts and has his henchmen disguise themselves as them. Catman: A cat burglar named Catman uses his trained pet lion and black panther to steal the world's largest diamond.
10	"Kragg the Conqueror/The Menacing Mindreader"	24 November 1979
Kragg the Conqueror: A scientist named Dr. Lash thaws out a Viking warrior named Kragg the Conqueror and his hound. He then plans to use them to abduct the Mayor, the police chief, and Mighty Man. The Menacing Mindreader: Miro the Mentalist uses a mind-reading machine that enables him to steal valuable information from the brains of his victims.
11	"Dog Gone Days/The Evil Evo-Ray"	1 December 1979
Dog Gone Days: Fed up with guard dogs spoiling his crimes, a small-time criminal becomes the Dogcatcher, luring and capturing dogs with a sonic whistle so he can eliminate every dog on Earth including Yukk. The Evil Evo-Ray: Future Man, a fully evolved human with futuristic powers, plans to turn the whole of mankind into cavemen, starting with his fellow scientists.
12	"The Video Villain/Krime Klown's Circus of Evil"	8 December 1979
The Video Villain: Camera Man uses his 3-D camera to travel through any television in the city and commit robberies. Krime Klown's Circus of Evil: Krime Klown uses his Krime Kazoo to turn the citizens into his circus henchmen.
13	"Copycat/The Sinister Super Suit"	15 December 1979
Copycat: Copycat and his henchman Ivan plot to steal the fortune and money belt of oil tychoon Bucks Galore. The Sinister Super Suit: Former TV villain Nefario creates a super suit which enables him to stay one step ahead of Mighty Man and Yukk while he is committing a series of crimes.
14	"The Malevolent Marble Man/Evil Notions with Evila's Potions"	22 December 1979
The Malevolent Marble Man: Marble Man uses a device to bring statues to life in a plot to drive out the citizens and claim the city for themselves. Evil Notions with Evila's Potions: Evila the Witch enchants the city's gems into following her back to her house.
15	"The Diabolical Dr. Locust/Where There's a Will, There's a Creep"	29 December 1979
The Diabolical Dr. Locust: Dr. Locust attempts to steal three ancient Chinese junks that, once combined, create a robotic warrior. Where There's a Will, There's a Creep: Stanley Johnson is set to inherit a fortune if he spends the night in a haunted house. The only problem is the Creep and his henchman Clyde plan to kidnap Stanley so that the Creep inherits the money himself.
16	"Doctor Icicle/The Glutunous Glop"	5 January 1980
Doctor Icicle: Doctor Icicle and his sidekick Frosty are kidnapping renowned scientists in order to build a super freezing machine that will freeze the sun. The Glutunous Glop: An evil professor named Sanfon Vulch creates Glop, a monster that can eat its way through anything. Glop is sent to Brandon Brewster's house to eat through his safe and steal a set of valuable blueprints.
