= Plastic Man =

Comic book superhero

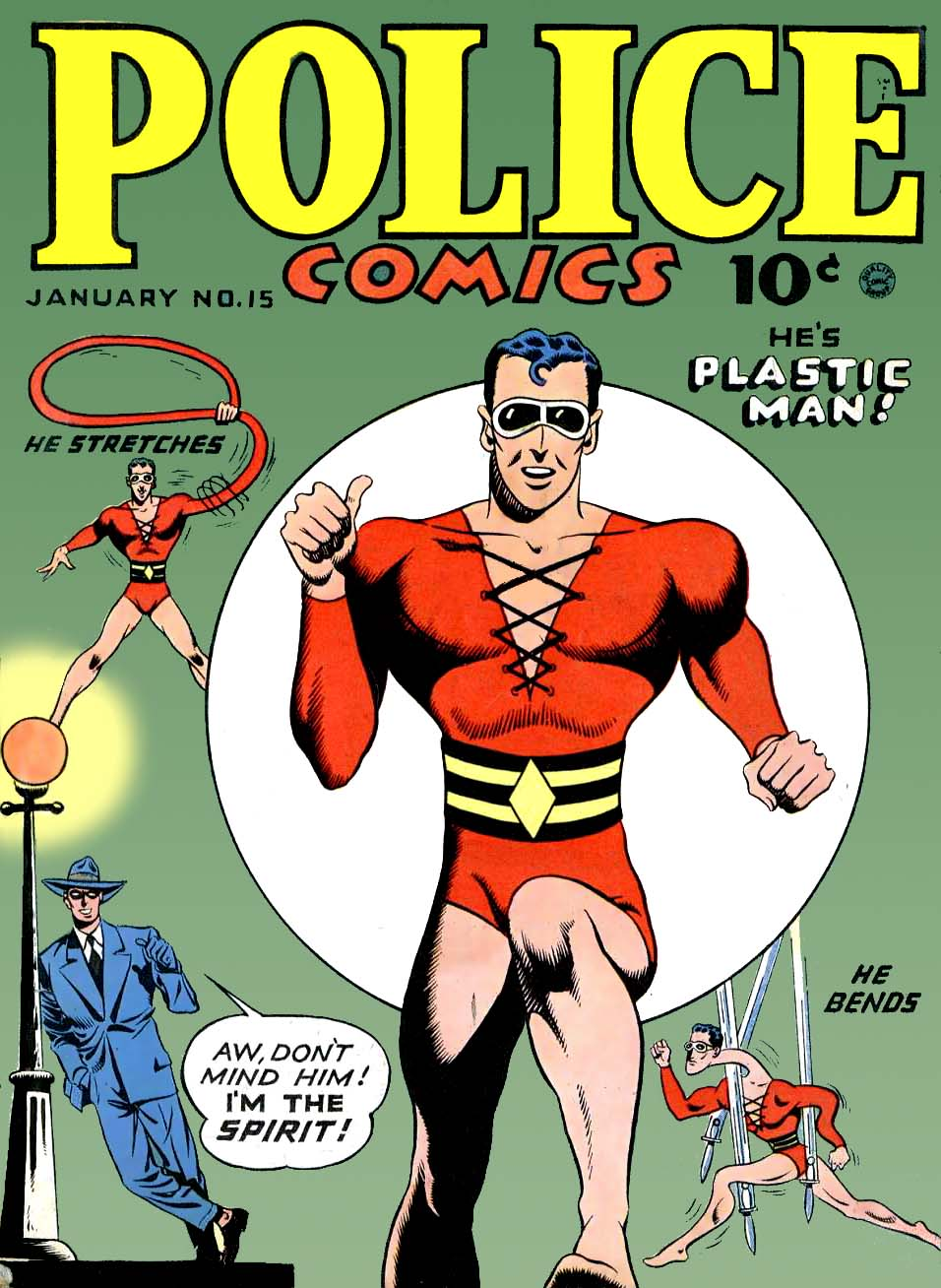
- Plastic Man on the cover of Police Comics #15, artwork by Gill Fox

Publication information
- Publisher: Quality Comics (1941–1956); DC Comics (1966–present)
- First appearance: Police Comics #1 (August 1941)
- Created by: Jack Cole

In-story information
- Alter ego: Patrick "Eel" O'Brian
- Species: Metahuman
- Team affiliations: Justice League; Federal Bureau of Investigation; National Bureau of Investigations; Justice League of Anarchy; All-Star Squadron; Freedom Fighters; Elastic Four; Secret Six; Terrifics
- Partnerships: Woozy Winks; Offspring; Batman; Martian Manhunter
- Abilities: Superhuman elasticity, malleability, plasticity, flexibility, contortion, and elongation; Shapeshifting; Size-shifting; Superhuman reach and swimming; Superhuman physicality via muscle augmentation; Regeneration; Invulnerability; Telepathic immunity; Density control; Immortality; Sleuthing skills; Impersonation and acting; Voice mimicry; Combat expertise

Plastic Man (Patrick "Eel" O'Brian) is a superhero featured in American comic books, first appearing in Police Comics #1, originally published by Quality Comics and later acquired by DC Comics. Created by cartoonist Jack Cole, Plastic Man was one of the first superheroes to incorporate humor into mainstream action storytelling. The character has been published in several solo series and has interacted with other characters, such as Batman and many others in the mainstream DC Universe as a member of the Justice League.

Plastic Man has been substantially adapted into media outside comics. Tom Kenny, Dana Snyder, and Michael Bell, among others, have voiced the character in animated television series and films.

== Publication history ==
Plastic Man was created by writer-artist Jack Cole, and first appeared in Police Comics #1 (August 1941).

One of Quality Comics' signature characters during the Golden Age of Comic Books, Plastic Man can stretch his body into any imaginable form. His adventures were known for their quirky, offbeat structure, and surreal slapstick humor. DC Comics acquired the character, among others, after Quality Comics shut down in 1956.

Although the character has never been a significant commercial success, Plastic Man has been a favorite character of many modern comic book creators, including writer Grant Morrison, who included him in their 1990s revival of the Justice League; Art Spiegelman, who profiled Cole for The New Yorker magazine; painter Alex Ross, who has frequently included him in covers and stories depicting the Justice League; writer-artist Kyle Baker, who wrote and illustrated an award-winning Plastic Man series; and Frank Miller, who included him in the Justice League in the comics All Star Batman & Robin, the Boy Wonder, and The Dark Knight Strikes Again.

== Fictional character biography ==
=== Original version by Jack Cole ===
Plastic Man was a crook named Patrick "Eel" O'Brian. Orphaned at age 10 and forced to live on the streets, he fell into a life of crime. As an adult, he became part of a burglary ring, specializing as a safecracker. During a late-night heist at the Crawford Chemical Works, he and his three fellow gang members were surprised by a night watchman. During the gang's escape, Eel was shot in the shoulder and doused with a large drum of unidentified chemical liquid. He escaped to the street, only to discover that his gang had driven off without him.

Fleeing on foot and suffering increasing disorientation from the gunshot wound and the exposure to the chemical, Eel eventually passed out on the foothills of a mountain near the city. He awoke to find himself in a bed in a mountain retreat, being tended to by a monk who had discovered him unconscious that morning. This monk, sensing a capacity for great good in O'Brian, turned away police officers who had trailed Eel to the monastery. This act of faith and kindness, combined with the realization that his gang had left him to be captured without a moment's hesitation—fanned Eel's longstanding dissatisfaction with his criminal life and his desire to reform.

During his short convalescence at the monastery, he discovered that the chemical had entered his bloodstream and caused a radical physical change. His body now had all of the properties of rubber, allowing him to stretch, bounce, and mold himself into any shape. He immediately determined to use his new abilities on the side of law and order, donning a red, black, and yellow (later red and yellow) rubber costume and capturing criminals as Plastic Man. He concealed his true identity with a pair of white goggles and by re-molding his face. As O'Brian, he maintained his career and connections with the underworld as a means of gathering information on criminal activity.

Plastic Man soon acquired a comic-relief sidekick, Woozy Winks, who was originally enchanted so that nature itself would protect him from harm. This power was eventually removed from the character, and Woozy became simply a bumbling yet loyal friend to Plastic Man.

In his original Golden Age/Quality Comics incarnation, Plastic Man eventually became a member of the city police force and then the FBI. By the time he became a federal officer, he had nearly completely abandoned his Eel O'Brian identity.

=== Phil Foglio version ===
After the 1985 Crisis on Infinite Earths, a 1988–1989 four-issue Plastic Man miniseries by Phil Foglio introduced a new version of Plastic Man: Eel O'Brian, abandoned by his criminal gang after being shot and exposed to the unidentified chemical, wandered the streets as his new powers developed, frightening others and bringing the police and National Guard down on him as a dangerous monster. Eel was at first oblivious to the changes to his body, but after realizing that he was the monster at large, he used his new abilities to escape his pursuers. Eel soon became so despondent over his new condition that he attempted suicide by jumping off a bridge.

Fortunately, he was interrupted by Woozy Winks, a former mental patient who had been kicked out of an institution due to lack of funding (or, as Woozy put it, "something called Reaganomics"), who desired nothing more than to return to the warm safety of a straitjacket and padded room. Eel and Woozy decided to work together and capitalize on Eel's new powers to make their fortunes (Eel wanting to get rich quick, Woozy just wanting his "old room" back), but could not decide whether there was more money in crime or crime-fighting, and resorted to flipping a coin to choose serving the law (though Woozy had his doubts early on). Eel ended up with the name ''Plastic Man'' after a reporter misinterpreted his first choice of ''Elastic Man''. Eel and Woozy set up a detective agency in New York City and went on to have various misadventures together.

=== JLA ===
Plastic Man was made a prominent member of the Justice League during Grant Morrison's run on the title. The story arc "Rock of Ages" shows Batman recruiting Eel to infiltrate Lex Luthor's Injustice League in the guise of the Joker, which he does successfully. He notably engages in combat with the goddess Circe, proving immune to her ability to turn humans into animals. He is later made a full-time member of the League and aids the League in several battles, including against Prometheus, Julian September, General Wade Eiling, an upgraded version of Amazo, a White Martian who assumes the identity of Bruce Wayne, and Queen Bee. During this period, he becomes close friends with fellow new members Steel (due to the fact that they are both "lateral thinkers") and Zauriel (Plastic Man later implies in the JLA: Heaven's Ladder graphic novel that his Catholic upbringing is a factor behind this, and Zauriel's existence is a testament to his faith). After the extended League dissolves at the end of the "World War III" arc, he is the only member other than the ''Big Seven'' heroes (Superman, Batman, Wonder Woman, Aquaman, The Flash, Martian Manhunter, and Green Lantern) to retain full-time membership in the JLA.

Plastic Man has also been instrumental in defeating several foes by himself, such as a Jokerized version of Doctor Polaris and the ''Burning Martian'' persona of J'onn J'onzz (Martian Manhunter). He has played substantial roles in nearly every major team-up and crossover featuring the League of this era: with the Titans (The Technis Imperative), Young Justice (World Without Grownups), the Justice Society of America (Virtue and Vice, where he is one of the heroes to be possessed by one of the Seven Deadly Sins), the Avengers (the JLA/Avengers crossover), where he joins the Avengers for a short time, and even the Looney Tunes (in the humorous Superman & Bugs Bunny miniseries). In the "JLA: Tower of Babel" arc, Plastic Man is frozen and shattered into pieces by Ra's al Ghul's League of Assassins, as part of an attack against the Justice League. Though he is put together again, this experience traumatizes him severely, and when it is discovered that the assassins were following methods devised by Batman, Eel joins Wonder Woman and Aquaman in voting Batman out of the League. The heroes reconcile in following issues.

The fact that Plastic Man was initially in the superhero business for the money has had an effect on his character development, notably in the storyline "Divided We Fall" by Mark Waid where he, along with other Justice League members, was separated into two people, his normal "civilian" identity and his superhero persona, by the manipulative wish-granting Id. While Plastic Man devolved from a person with a sense of humor into a constantly wisecracking and almost ineffectual idiot, the now "normal" Eel O'Brian struggled with the criminal tendencies he had suppressed as he had become comfortable with his role as a superhero and wondered if he had actually changed for the better at all or this was just part of the super-hero "act". Ultimately, Eel was the driving force behind the other transformed Leaguers banding together to re-join with their superheroic selves, noting that Bruce Wayne in particular was approaching a mental breakdown as he struggled with his rage over his parents' murder – having lacked the ability to do anything about it, as Batman was the identity that had 'inherited' his skills. Eel demonstrates this to the other divided Leaguers by savagely beating Bruce Wayne with a gun in the guise of a mugger to prove Wayne's ineffectiveness, and demonstrate the degree of psychological damage he has suffered due to the split. Later, Batman comments that it was a wise move "under the circumstances". Later, Plastic Man approaches Batman for help when he learns that Eel's estranged ten-year-old son Luke has fallen in with a gang of criminals, and has inherited his father's shape-shifting abilities, possibly to an even greater degree than Plastic Man's own. Plastic Man admits to Batman that he doesn't know if he ran away from being a father because he was enjoying his new life as a hero, or because he was afraid of becoming a parent for his son. Batman later intimidates Luke into returning home, and informs Plastic Man that he is disappointed in his cowardice, imagining that Eel would have shown Luke fatherly love; in reality, Plastic Man chose only to hide in Batman's utility belt during the whole encounter with Luke.

During the story arc "The Obsidian Age", Plastic Man and the other main members of the JLA were transported through time thousands of years earlier to the beginning days of Atlantis. During a battle with the antagonists, Plastic Man was frozen and then shattered into pieces. Having no way to locate all the pieces, much less fix him, with the technology of the day, the JLA returned to their own time. There they were eventually successful in finding all the pieces and restoring Plastic Man. Plastic Man had been conscious the entire time but unable to move, which had a profoundly negative effect on his mind. He admitted he had lost his nerve and quit the JLA, hoping to live a regular life. This return to normalcy was made easier after a new encounter with his now-teenage son, which made Eel feel that the boy needed a father and a normal life. Eventually, Batman convinced Plastic Man to return to his life as a super hero again when they needed his shape-shifting skills and immunity to telepathy to defeat the Martian Manhunter, who had regressed to a racial memory of the long-forgotten 'Burning Martians' after overcoming his weakness to fire. After a few more cases, Plastic Man is present at the memorial service held after this incarnation of the Justice League officially disbands during the Infinite Crisis storyline.

=== 52, One Year Later, Countdown and Blackest Night ===
In the 2006 "One Year Later" DC Comics crossover storyline that followed the "Infinite Crisis" crossover, a young man with similar appearance and powers as Plastic Man appears briefly in the superteam series Teen Titans Vol. 3, #34 written by R.J. Carter. The character wears a white costume with red goggles, similar to that of Offspring, Plastic Man's son in the earlier 1999 DC miniseries The Kingdom by Mark Waid. While the Teen Titans story itself does not identify the character, page two of a published script supposedly by writer Geoff Johns' specifies it is "Plastic Man's son, Offspring". Plastic Man's son is also shown in costume, and identified as Offspring, in the 2006 weekly series 52 in Week 35 (written by Geoff Johns, Grant Morrison, Greg Rucka and Mark Waid) when he is injured while rescuing a number of the depowered Everyman heroes. Eventually, Plastic Man and Offspring come together as father and son and briefly even had an idyllic family set up until Plastic Man was convinced that he could not deny his destiny as a super hero.

In Countdown to Mystery #1 (2007) written by Lilah Sturges, Plastic Man is seduced by Eclipso, being made to believe he is a joke among his fellow heroes, and the only way for him to get some respect is through Eclipso. He is later freed of this corruption by Bruce Gordon. Plastic Man makes his next appearance within the pages of Green Arrow/Black Canary #8 by Judd Winick, having been freed from a stasis tube by Green Arrow. His DNA is taken by Sivana and used to augment an amnesiac Connor Hawke, in a bid to turn the young hero into a brainwashed slave with a strong healing factor.

Plastic Man appeared for a brief period in the 2009 Justice League of America vol. 2 series written by Len Wein. After joining up with the team following the events of Final Crisis, Plastic Man has his effectiveness questioned by his teammate Dr. Light, which starts a fight between the two, which Vixen breaks up. Vixen reassigns Plastic Man to team up with Dr. Light to stop the Royal Flush Gang robbery. Though they experience some control issues between them, the Royal Flush Gang is defeated and Plastic Man and Dr. Light finally stop arguing.

During a massive battle at the Justice League Satellite in Justice League: Cry for Justice, Prometheus injected Plastic Man with a chemical that badly damaged his plastic body. The chemicals caused Eel to suffer from a condition where it took great concentration to keep himself in his usual, semi-solid state and caused him pain when he even thought about changing shape, thus leaving him in an infirm state.

In the Blackest Night crossover, while still suffering from his deteriorating state, Plastic Man had his heart torn out by the Black Lantern Vibe, seemingly killing him. Due to his near-invulnerability, he was able to survive, albeit badly wounded. Vixen states that Plastic Man was being taken care of at S.T.A.R. Labs and that he would be unable to return to the League.

Plastic Man later appeared in Justice League: Generation Lost, helping a large coalition of heroes on an unsuccessful mission to trace Maxwell Lord. He had been seemingly cured of his condition, and was shown retaining his normal shape without issue or pain.

Later, he aids the JLA on their mission into Hell, where he helps Batman defeat Geryon. The League learns Satanus' plans to use Dante's mask to become powerful. Plastic Man grabs the mask, which possesses him. The Leagues combines forces to remove the mask, which is incinerated, seemingly killing Plastic Man. It is later revealed that Zauriel transported him into another dimension before helping the League escape Hell.

=== The New 52 ===
In September 2011, The New 52 rebooted DC's continuity. In this new timeline, Plastic Man is considered as one of the candidates for the United Nations-sponsored Justice League International. He is denied a spot on the team for being too unpredictable. This cameo appearance was later retconned by "Eel" O'Brian's proper New 52 introduction in Justice League (vol. 2) #25 (February 2014).

=== DC Rebirth ===
In The Terrifics series, Plastic Man assists Mister Terrific in thwarting Simon Stagg's plot to open a portal to the Dark Multiverse using Metamorpho, who had been transmuted to Nth Metal. While trying to get Stagg to close the portal with the help of Plastic Man, Mister Terrific is sucked into the portal with Plastic Man and Metamorpho. Upon arriving on a lifeless world, they encounter Phantom Girl, who has been trapped in an intangible state since she was a child. When the four of them find a computer in the gut of a giant dead creature, they are greeted by a hologram of Tom Strong, who states that they are needed to save the universe.

Due to the effects of the Dark Multiverse energy, Mister Terrific concludes that the Terrifics are unable to be apart for long periods of time. The team goes through several adventures whilst being attacked by a figure known as Doctor Dread, who is later revealed to be Java. This revelation, coupled with the team being cured of their condition, causes everyone to split up. Plastic Man attempts to connect with his ex Angel and their son Luke, who has inherited his stretching powers. Initially reluctant, the two bond over a game of basketball and stealing the Batmobile. They are then called upon by the rest of the team to band together and save Mr. Terrifc from the Terribles, a team assembled by Java. Following the Terribles' defeat and imprisonment, the Terrifics reunite, with Luke, Element Dog, and Miss Terrific joining the roster.

=== DC All In ===
During the events of Absolute Power, Plastic Man is one of the many superheroes whose powers are taken from them. When they are returned, his powers are swapped with that of Phantom Girl's. Plastic Man is later shown as a member of the newly formed Justice League Unlimited. With the help of both versions of the Atom, he and Phantom Girl regain their original powers.

Plastic Man is one of the combatants in the DC K.O. event, making it through the first round but being destroyed by Metamorpho in the second. Despite this, near the last round he is brought back along with Black Lightning by the Heart of Apokolips. They are thrown into a battle with Scorpion and Sub-Zero from the Mortal Kombat series, emerging victorious. After Darkseid's defeat, Plastic Man returns to active duty with the Justice League.

== Powers and abilities ==
Plastic Man's powers are derived from an accident in which his body was bathed in an unknown industrial chemical mixture that entered his bloodstream through a gunshot wound. This caused a body-wide mutagenic process that transformed his physiology. Plastic Man exists in a fluid state, neither entirely liquid nor solid. He has complete control over his entire molecular structure. He can stretch his limbs and body to superhuman lengths and sizes. There is no known limit to how far Plastic Man can stretch his body. He can shrink himself down to a few inches tall (posed as one of Batman's utility belt pockets) or become a titan (the size of skyscrapers). He can contort his body into various positions and sizes impossible for ordinary humans, such as being entirely flat to slip under a door, using his fingers to pick conventional lock, compressing himself into a ball to ricochet off of things, and inflating his body. He can also use it for disguise by changing the shape of his face and body, contributory to his work as a sleuth. Due to his fluid state, Plastic Man can open holes in his body and turn himself into objects with mobile parts. In addition, he can alter his bodily mass and physical constitution at will, creating virtually no limit to the sizes and shapes he can contort himself into. There is nothing he cannot alter his body into, which includes basic shapes or dangerous weapons, avatars of other superheroes, and functional automobiles. These stretching capabilities grant Plastic Man agility, flexibility, and coordination far beyond the natural limits of the human body. He can alter his strength by growing or adding more muscle.

Plastic Man's powers extraordinarily augment his durability. Some stories, perhaps of anecdotal quality, have showed him susceptible to surprise attack by bullets, in one case oozing a substance similar to liquid plastic. His unique physiology makes him impervious to conventional means of harm such as bullets, blasts, and blunt force. He is also able to withstand corrosives, punctures, and concussions without sustaining any injury (although he can be momentarily stunned). Batman once mentioned that he could presumably even withstand a nuclear detonation. This is mainly due to the fact that he has full control over his density, so he can willfully increase his durability as he wishes. His bodily mass can be dispersed, but for all intents and purposes, it is invulnerable, even from many forms of magic in the DC Universe. He is able to regenerate or assimilate lost or damaged tissue, although he needs to be reasonably intact for this process to begin. For example, Plastic Man was once reduced to individual, separate molecules and scattered across the Atlantic Ocean for centuries. He was only capable of returning to his usual form after the rest of the League were able to gather enough of his molecules and restore approximately 80% of his body mass, after which he began to regenerate the remaining 20% on his own.

Plastic Man has proven to be insusceptible to the effects of telepathy, as stated by Batman in JLA #88 (2003). However, this is contradicted by other depictions in the series where his mind can be read and he can be reached by telepathic communication. Plastic Man does not appear to age; if he does, it is at a rate far slower than that of normal human beings. In the aftermath of the Justice League story Arc "Obsidian Age", Plastic Man was discovered to have survived for 3,000 years scattered into separate, individual molecules on the bottom of the Atlantic Ocean without decaying or being otherwise affected at all. He can detect ultrasonic frequencies because his body will start to "ripple" when an ultrasonic frequency is triggered.

As stated by the Black Lantern corpsman Vibe, Plastic Man's internal organs (such as his heart when Black Lantern Vibe tried to rip it out) could not be removed, unlike many of the Black Lanterns' victims. This perhaps implies that Plastic Man is himself more like one giant, living organ than he is a "whole" made of component parts and organs, etc.

His semi-liquid form remains stable at relatively high and low temperatures, provided that the temperature change is gradual. A sudden change induces a complete change of state, creating a truly solid or truly liquid form. Plastic Man was incapacitated in the JLA story arc "Tower of Babel" when mercenaries froze and shattered his body. Once thawed and reassembled, he was physically unharmed. In the JLA story arc "Divided We Fall", Plastic Man is shown to have some weakness to extreme heat (intense heat vision attack from a Martian) and was temporarily melted. In some versions, Plastic Man is vulnerable to chemicals such as acetone, which melts and destabilizes his body. Furthermore, he is initially unable to change the color of his body, requiring great concentration to do so.

Plastic Man was once a professional thief, specializing as a safecracker. Although no longer a criminal, he understands the criminal mind, enabling him to be an effective sleuth. He is also considered to be a lateral thinker and much smarter than he lets on.

== Enemies ==
Plastic Man has fought many enemies in his comics:

- Acid Tongue – A criminal who can spit acid at a target from several yards away.
- Abba and Dabba – Two wanted con-men.
- Ali Krim
- Amorpho – A sentient blob of protoplasm from an unknown distant planet.
- Archie Type – A criminal that Plastic Man was after.
- Baldy Bushwhack
- B. T. Tokus
- Beauteous Bessie
- Big Beaver
- Bizarro – A backwards clone of Superman.
- Blind Ali – A blind would-be assassin.
- Boss Annova – The self-appointed king of all street crime in the city of Metropolis.
- Brain Trust
- Brickface – A crime boss with a segmented face.
- Brotherhood of the Savage Caribou
- Bunyon O'Banyon
- The Burning – Plastic Man was chosen by Batman to battle the Martian Manhunter when he was corrupted by The Burning.
- Cabal – A group of villains that were behind a multi-dimensional conspiracy and ran afoul of Plastic Man and Obscura.
  - Amazo – An android that can copy the powers of the Justice League.
  - Doctor Psycho – A dwarfish telepath and an enemy of Wonder Woman.
  - Hugo Strange – A mad scientist and an enemy of Batman.
  - Per Degaton – A supervillain obsessed with time travel and a frequent enemy of the Justice Society of America.
  - Queen Bee – An alien bee-themed criminal.
  - Teel
- Carrot-Man – A criminal who dresses up as a carrot.
- Cauldron
- Chatterbox – Lou Kwashus is a disc jockey-themed supervillain with a sonic weapon.
- Cheeseface – A cheese-themed criminal who has been selling explosive bottles of milk.
  - Edam O'Grotton – Cheeseface's henchman.
- Closets Kennedy
- The Crab
- Desperate Desmond
- Thanos
- Frank The Tank
- Big Balls Benson
- Doctor Dome – A supervillain in a dome-shaped helmet. He is the closest thing Plastic Man has to an arch-enemy.
  - Lynx – Doctor Dome's sidekick.
  - Professor X – A scientist who Doctor Dome used to cause havoc.
- Doctor Forklift – A half-man, half-forklift scientist.
- Doctor Honctoff – An evil robotics genius.
  - Bogus Men – A group of androids that were created by Doctor Honctoff.
- Dopey Joe
- Dr. Ameeba
- Dr. Erudite
- Dr. Phobia
- Dr. Volt
- Dollmaker – Marcel Mannequin is an extremely talented dollmaker who uses sentient dolls to commit crimes.
- Electra
- Even Steven – A balanced-obsessed criminal.
  - Dr. Meg LeMania – Even Steven's scientist minion.
- Fargo Freddie, The Lava Man – An unappreciated and underpaid employee who transformed himself into living lava via active volcano.
- Froggie Fink
- The Gag Man
- Goldzinger – A gold-magnetizing crook.
- Granite Lady – A former singer who turned down all men and her skin became rock-like, due to the serum's effects.
- The Grasshopper – An armed jewel thief who was subjected to a serum that granted him leaping abilities.
- The Green Terror
- Hairy Arms – A gang leader who formerly served the Axis Powers, until his own pals found out and removed him from their group.
- Hands
- Hate
- The Hotrod
- Ice Man – An ice delivery man who turned to a life of crime.
- Killer Joe – A professional hitman.
- King Lughead
- King of Spades – The leader of a spade-themed gang.
  - Jack of Spades – A member of the King of Spades' gang.
  - Queen of Spades – A member of the King of Spades' gang.
- The King Of Zing
- Kolonel Kool – Originally an agent at the NBI named Gulliver "Gully" Foyle, Plastic Man's success there at his expense made Foyle jealous and out for revenge. Kolonel Kool took over Boss Annova's gang before being nabbed by his former co-worker.
- Lawbook – He offers a reward to any crook who can find a way to kill Plastic Man.
- League of Assassins – An organization of assassins.
  - Ra's al Ghul – The leader of the League of Assassins.
  - Talia al Ghul – The daughter of Ra's al Ghul and member of the League of Assassins.
- Lex Luthor – The CEO of LexCorp and enemy of Superman who was working as the President of the United States at the time.
- The Lobster
- Louie The Lift
- Lowbrow – A short and insanely confident criminal who killed Cindy Bloch.
- Lucky 7
- Lucius D. Dratt, Doctor Dratt – A twisted neurochemist.
- Madam Brawn – A teacher who trains female ex-cons at her school to fight men on equal grounds. Dies in Police Comics #5.
- Madame Merciless – A female criminal hired by Doctor Dome to hypnotize Plastic Man.
- Madame Serpina – A sideshow entertainer-turned-assassin.
- Malleable Man – A criminal associate of Eel O'Brien who recreated the accident that gave Plastic Man his powers.
- Man-Bat – Kirk Langstrom is a zoologist who takes a serum that transforms him into Man-Bat. After being subdued by Plastic Man, Man-Bat agreed to help him and Obscura investigate a multi-dimensional conspiracy.
- The Mangler
- The Master Artist
- Max the Knife – A gang leader that went up against Marty "The Mouse" Meeker" after he was given powers by two aliens from the Redinskian race.
- Meat By-Product – A monster spawned from a meat by-product.
- Molder – A sculpting plastic-themed criminal who fought Plastic Man and Batman.
- Mona Mayhem
- The Moon Wizard
- Mostolo
- The Moulder
- Mister Aqua – A former chemist who was experimenting with chemicals that turned him into living water. Woozy accidentally drank him.
- Mr. Cat
- Mister Green – A supervillain who became a plant-based lifeform and then, dies after reverting to human form.
- Mr. Happiness
- Mr. Misfit
- (The Melancholy) Mister Morbid – A criminal who is always sad and dislikes happiness.
- Mr. Stingker
- Mister Uglee – A masked criminal with a terrifyingly hideous face who wanted to disfigure all other men so he would be the most handsome man in the world in comparison.
- Mister Wheels – The elderly leader of an organized crime ring called Crime Enterprises who confined himself to a wheelchair.
- Murray "the Swede" Schneiderman – A bank robber.
- Scissor Seven
- Ooze Brothers – Clem, Flem, and Lem are three villains who use ooze in their crimes.
- The Owl
- Pinkeye – An albino spy.
- Pinky Flowers
- Poison Ivy – A plant-themed enemy of Batman. Poison Ivy posed as Angel O'Brien to get revenge on Plastic Man.
- Prankster – An enemy of Superman who uses pranks in his criminal activities. He once used robot duplicates of the Justice League to fool the police into believing that Plastic Man was a criminal.
- Professor Goodman
- Professor Dimwit
- Professor Spindrift
- Ramalama
- Red Herring – An anthropomorphic herring who appears to meddle with the investigations of crimes he was not involved in.
- Remember
- Rice O'Rooney – The "San Francisco Threat", he was considered to be the highest paid hitman in the country.
- Robby Reed – When Robby Reed's H-Dial was rusted, he ended up turning into evil versions of some of his hero forms.
- Rocky Goober
- Roxanne Roller – A roller-skating villain seeking vengeance against rock stars who supposedly spurned her.
- Rubberneck – Perry Skope villain with super-strength and suggestions of a rubbery resiliency.
  - Puttyface – Mal E. Able is the partner of Rubberneck.
- Ruby Ryder – A ruthless business woman and owner of Ruby Ryder Inc. who fought Plastic Man and Batman.
- SAPMALAL – Short for Society to Assassinate Plastic Man And Live A Little, they are a group who is out to eliminate Plastic Man.
  - Assassin – A member of SAPMALAL who Plastic Man poses as.
  - Ivan Byturnozov – A member of SAPMALAL.
  - Jean Le Feet – A member of SAPMALAL.
  - Lefty McGoon – A member of SAPMALAL.
  - Sir Reginald Ratfinque – A member of SAPMALAL.
- Sadly Sadly – A man whose face is so pathetic that banks hand over money.
- Saxon – A crook who always speaks in alliteration.
- Skulllface –
  - Eloc – Eloc is Cole spelled backwards.
- Skunk – AKA the B.O. Bandit, the Skunk emanated an excruciatingly foul odor as a result of having never, in his entire life, bathed.
- Sleepy Eyes – A supervillain who puts people to sleep just by looking at them.
- Sludge – A monster spawned from sludge.
- Snuffer – A cyborg killer in the employ of Rice O'Rooney, the San Francisco hitman directed the mechanical assassin to kill Plastic Man for Boss Annova.
- Sphinx – A super-strong crook that once tried to take over Doctor Dome's territory.
- Spider – Frank Stacy is a scientist who operated as a spider-themed villain.
- Stickyfinger – A criminal who has been sticking up a lot of people around Mammoth City.
- Stretcho
- Supreme Leader
- Toyman – A toy-themed criminal and enemy of Superman. Plastic Man once helped Superman fight Toyman.
- Thrilla
- Time Trapper – Poison Ivy mind-controlled Metron to pose as the Time Trapper.
- Weasel – Mr. Waisel is a criminal who took advantage of Plastic Man's amnesia.
- Weapons
- Whirling Dervish – Big-toed ballet dancer turned assassin. Murdered by Pinkeye.
- Black Dynamite
- The Yes-Man – A crime boss who only says Yes until Plastic Man forces him to say No at which time he snaps.
- Zircon

== Other versions ==
- An alternate universe version of Plastic Man from Earth-31 appears in The Dark Knight Strikes Again. This version was locked in Arkham Asylum for years, being driven insane in the process.
- An alternate universe version of Plastic Man appears in All Star Batman & Robin, the Boy Wonder.
- An alternate universe version of Plastic Man from Earth-9 appears in the Tangent Comics imprint. This version is Gunther Ganz, a scientist whose consciousness was transferred into living polymer.
- Plastic Man appears in JLA/Avengers.
- A villainous alternate universe version of Eel O'Brian appears in Flashpoint. This version is a villain who dislikes being called Plastic Man.
- An alternate universe version of Plastic Man appears in the DC Black Label series Plastic Man No More!, written by Christopher Cantwell and illustrated by Alex Lins and Jacob Edgar. This version is a member of the Justice League and his son Offspring is also working as a superhero. At the beginning of the story Plastic Man is hit by a villain's laser weapon which destabilizes his body's molecular structure. Seeking a cure, he aligns himself with a scientist and sets off a chain of events that leads him back to his morally questionable days as a criminal.

== Collected editions ==
Collected editions of Plastic Man comics
Title	Material collected	Published date	ISBN
Plastic Man Archives Volume 1	Police Comics #1–20	February 1999	978-1563894688
Plastic Man Archives Volume 2	Police Comics #21–30, Plastic Man (Volume 1) #1	December 2000	978-1563896217
Plastic Man Archives Volume 3	Police Comics #31–39, Plastic Man (Volume 1) #2	December 2001	978-1563898471
Plastic Man Archives Volume 4	Police Comics #40–49, Plastic Man (Volume 1) #3	November 2002	978-1563898358
Plastic Man Archives Volume 5	Police Comics #50–58, Plastic Man (Volume 1) #4	October 2003	978-1563899867
Plastic Man Archives Volume 6	Police Comics #59–65, Plastic Man (Volume 1) #5–6	November 2004	978-1401201548
Plastic Man Archives Volume 7	Police Comics #66–71, Plastic Man (Volume 1) #7–8	January 2006	978-1401204136
Plastic Man Archives Volume 8	Police Comics #72–77, Plastic Man (Volume 1) #9–10	August 2006	978-1401207779
DC's Finest: The Origin of Plastic Man	Police Comics #1–36, Plastic Man (Volume 1) #1-2	March 2025	ISBN 978-1799500650
Plastic Man Volume 1: On the Lam	Plastic Man (Volume 4) #1–6	November 2004	978-1401203436
Plastic Man Volume 2: Rubber Bandits	Plastic Man (Volume 4) #8–11, 13–14	December 2005	978-1401207298
Plastic Man: Rubber Banded – The Deluxe Edition	Plastic Man (Volume 4) #1–20	November 2020	978-1779504845
Convergence: Infinite Earths: Book Two	Convergence: Plastic Man and the Freedom Fighters #1–2 and Convergence: Shazam! #1–2, Convergence: Booster Gold #1–2, Convergence: Blue Beetle #1–2, Convergence: Crime Syndicate #1–2	November 2015	978-1401258382
Plastic Man	Plastic Man (Volume 5) #1–6	April 2019	978-1401289379

== In other media ==
=== Television ===
- A "Plastic Man" pilot was planned first by Hal Seeger Productions, then by Filmation, though neither came to pass.
- Plastic Man makes a cameo appearance in the Super Friends episode "Professor Goodfellow's G.E.E.C.", voiced by Norman Alden.
- Plastic Man appears in the animated series The Plastic Man Comedy/Adventure Show, voiced by Michael Bell. This version is an operative of an unnamed covert agency partnered with a bumbling Hawaiian sidekick named Hula-Hula, his girlfriend Penny, and eventually his son Baby Plas. Additionally, Mark Taylor portrays Plastic Man in live action as host for the syndicated version of the series.
- Warner Bros. Animation and Cartoon Network commissioned a Plastic Man television pilot, "Puddle Trouble", in 2006, produced by Andy Suriano and Tom Kenny, with the latter also providing Plastic Man's voice, and designed and storyboarded by Stephen DeStefano. However, Cartoon Network decided not to pick up Plastic Man as a series and has never aired the episode. "Puddle Trouble" was later released on the Plastic Man: The Complete Collection DVD set.
- Plastic Man appears in Batman: The Brave and the Bold, voiced again by Tom Kenny. This version was originally an underling of Kite Man who lived in a suburban home with his family. While joining Kite Man for a heist, Batman intervened, inadvertently caused the accident that turned O'Brian into Plastic Man, and helped him become a superhero. Additionally, an Earth-Three counterpart of Plastic Man named Rubber Man makes a non-speaking appearance in the episode "Deep Cover for Batman!" as a member of the Injustice Syndicate.
- Plastic Man makes non-speaking appearances in Young Justice. This version is a member of the Justice League.
- Plastic Man appears in the Mad segment "That's What Super Friends Are For", voiced by Dana Snyder.
- Plastic Man appears in Robot Chicken.
- Plastic Man appears in the DC Nation Shorts, voiced again by Tom Kenny.
- Plastic Man appears in Justice League Action, voiced again by Dana Snyder. This version is a member of the Justice League.
- Eel O'Brien appears in Batman: Caped Crusader, voiced again by Tom Kenny. This version is a news reporter.

=== Film ===
- Warner Bros. Pictures began development on a film centered around Plastic Man in the early 1990s, with Amblin Entertainment producing and Bryan Spicer directing. The Wachowskis wrote the screenplay in 1995. Director Mick Garris claims in a commentary of Sleepwalkers that he was also being eyed to direct the proposed film.
- Plastic Man makes a non-speaking cameo appearance in Justice League: The New Frontier.
- Plastic Man appears in Lego DC Comics Super Heroes: Justice League vs. Bizarro League, voiced again by Tom Kenny.
- Plastic Man appears in Scooby-Doo! & Batman: The Brave and the Bold, voiced again by Tom Kenny.
- Kevin Smith stated at Calgary Comic and Entertainment Expo that he met with Geoff Johns and pitched an animated Plastic Man film that he wrote for DC, with Jim Parsons voicing the titular character, before the film was scrapped.
- In December 2018, development for a new Plastic Man film was announced, with Amanda Idoko writing the screenplay and Robert Shaye as executive producer. In December 2020, it was reported that Cat Vasko was hired to rewrite Idoko's screenplay while the project was being reworked into a female-centered film.
- Plastic Man appears in Lego DC Comics Super Heroes: The Flash, voiced again by Tom Kenny.
- Plastic Man appears in Teen Titans Go! To the Movies, voiced by Joey Cappabianca.
- Plastic Man appears in Injustice, voiced by Oliver Hudson.

=== Video games ===
- Plastic Man appears as a playable character in Batman: The Brave and the Bold – The Videogame, voiced again by Tom Kenny (originally one Michael González in earlier builds).
- Plastic Man appears as a character summon in Scribblenauts Unmasked: A DC Comics Adventure.
- Plastic Man appears as a playable character in Lego Batman 3: Beyond Gotham, voiced by Dee Bradley Baker.
- Plastic Man appears as a playable character in Lego DC Super-Villains, voiced by J. P. Karliak.

=== Miscellaneous ===
- Plastic Man appears in the April 19, 1999 issue of The New Yorker, which included a biography of Jack Cole by Art Spiegelman. Two years later, this would be included in the latter and Chip Kidd's book Jack Cole and Plastic Man: Forms Stretched to Their Limits.
- Plastic Man appears in the Injustice: Gods Among Us prequel comic. He speaks out against Superman's altered ethics following the Metropolis bombing, but does not get physically involved until Superman arrests his son, Luke. After rescuing Luke, among other inmates, from the Regime's underwater prison, Plastic Man encourages them to fight against Superman.
- Plastic Man makes a cameo appearance in the DC Super Hero Girls episode "Welcome to Super Hero High" as a graduate of the eponymous school.
- Plastic Man appears in the Injustice 2 prequel comic as a member of Batman's Justice League Task Force.
- Plastic Man appears in Mad magazine #499. Additionally, a parody of Plastic Man named "Plastic Sam" appears in issue #14 of the Mad magazine comic book.

== See also ==
- Stacey Augmon, a professional basketball player sometimes nicknamed "Plastic Man".

Similar characters

- Elongated Man, another DC Comics character with similar powers.
- Elasti-Girl, a fellow DC Comics hero from Doom Patrol who can stretch as well.
- Elastigirl, from the 2004 Pixar movie The Incredibles and its sequel.
- Elastic Lad, Superman's pal Jimmy Olsen who gains Plastic Man-like powers when drinking a special serum.
- Kamala Khan, alias Ms. Marvel, a Marvel Comics superhero whose "polymorphic" powers include stretching.
- Lastikman, a Filipino character with similar powers developed by Mars Ravelo in 1964.
- Monkey D. Luffy, a manga character who has abilities similar to Plastic Man, starring in the Japanese comic One Piece.
- Jake the Dog, from Adventure Time.
- Mister Fantastic, a Marvel superhero from Fantastic Four, with abilities similar to Plastic Man.
- Poly Mer of PS238, a gender-swapped child version of Plastic Man with similar abilities and personality.
- Thin Man, another elastic superhero from Marvel Comics, who first appeared in Marvel's predecessor, Timely Comics.
- Flatman, another Marvel hero with the ability to stretch.
- Tiramolla, an Italian comic book character with a similar elastic body.
