= Mike S. Miller =

Hawaiian-American illustrator and writer

- Born: 1971 (age 54–55) Hawaii, U.S.
- Areas: Writer, artist

Mike S. Miller (born 1971) is a Native Hawaiian-American comic book illustrator and writer, who has done work for Malibu Comics, Marvel Comics, DC Comics, and Image Comics, as well as self-published work under the imprint Alias Enterprises and online. Some of his better known work is on DC's Injustice: Gods Among Us series.

== Career ==
Miller's early comics work includes inking issues of Freak Force for Malibu Comics in the early 1990s, and penciling issues of Wolverine and other X-Men titles for Marvel in the late 1990s. His DC work includes penciling several issues of Adventures of Superman, JLA in 2000 and 2001, and his longest running series, Injustice: Gods Among Us.

He did pencil and ink work for the comics adaptation of George R. R. Martin's Hedge Knight series (2003–2004, 2007) and for Robert Jordan's The Wheel of Time: New Spring (2005–2010).

Miller created and co-wrote The Imaginaries, which was published in 2005 by Image Comics, followed by a brief run in 2008 from Bluewater Productions.

His 2005 comic book series Deal with the Devil was optioned in 2008 by Lionsgate Films, but not produced.

Miller drew two webcomics on his own website, along with co-creator Everett Fitzgerald, Comicstripclub: the slice-of-life video game webcomic Electronic Tigers, and RLC (Right Left Center), a political series with a conservative viewpoint. As of 2014, the latest comic on the site was from 2009; by 2017, the website was defunct.

In the late 2010s he began producing his creator-owned Blacklist Universe, and solicited sales of Lonestar, the first book from it, through Indiegogo.

In 2020 he launched a comic through Indiegogo called The MAGAnificent 7. The comic features superhero characters such as "El Rushbo" and "Shap-Hero" fighting the leftist "Sorosian" to save President Trump.

In 2021 he worked on a graphic novel called Shadow of the Conqueror by Shad M. Brooks.

In 2025 he worked on a cover for the Rippaverse Comics book The Horseman #1 by Chuck Dixon.

== Controversies ==
=== Use of Mike Wieringo's art and name ===
In January 2019, Miller announced that he owned an old Spider-Man cover rough draft (a "breakdown") that had been done by Mike Wieringo, who had died in 2007, and that he proposed finishing it but making it into a cover for his Lonestar series. He tweeted, "Hahaha... I own it. I can throw it in the trash if I want to. If it stirs up controversy, all the better." After inking the breakdown and posting it, calling the work "The last Mike Wieringo original cover that may ever see print!", other creators criticized him for using the name of a renowned, deceased artist to promote his work. They also accused him of forging Wieringo's signature, inking it into the art and writing Weiringo's name in the artist credit space along his own. Mike Wieringo's executor, his brother Matt, insisted Miller had to remove the signature.

Miller initially agreed not to use it, and posted a video of him burning the paper, the title of which was a reference to the Final Solution. A few days later, Miller declared that he had burnt a fake copy to troll people.

=== Religious messages in comics ===
Comic book writer Joe Harris said that after Miller drew the comic book "X-Factor #147", Harris had to "try and artfully place caption narration to cover all the unscripted 'Jesus Saves!' and 'Evolution: A Theory In Crisis' type messages he'd scribbled and hidden throughout the damn thing." Harris recalls covering up messages with captions and word balloons.

In another comic drawn by Miller, "Wolverine #144", Miller successfully included a URL to a conservative Christian website and a reference to Jesus's final words in pieces of signage, a "choose life" bumper sticker, and a scene of Wolverine on a crucifix. In response to the articles, Miller tweeted that the story was not newsworthy and its reporter was "a hack".

== Personal life ==
Miller lives in San Diego, California.

== Bibliography ==
=== Artist ===
- Batman: Arkham Unhinged
- Injustice 2
- Injustice: Gods Among Us
- The Horseman #1

=== Inker ===
- DC Universe Online Legends
- End of Nations
- Starcraft #6, 7
- Wildcats #29, 30

=== Penciler ===
- DC Universe Online Legends
- End of Nations
- Starcraft #6, 7
- Wildcats #29, 30

=== Colorist ===
- DC Universe Online Legends
