= Max Miller (jazz musician) =

American jazz pianist and vibraphone player

- Max Miller

Background information
- Born: Edward Maxwell Miller; November 17, 1911; Chicago, Illinois, U.S.
- Died: November 13, 1985 (aged 73)
- Genres: Jazz
- Occupation: Musician
- Instruments: Piano, vibraphone
- Years active: 1927–70
- Labels: Columbia, Life, Gold Seal

Edward Maxwell Miller (November 17, 1911 – November 13, 1985) was an American jazz pianist and vibraphone player. He had a forty-year career that peaked in the 1940s and '50s. Many of his compositions use extended chord harmonies, polyphony, and polytonality and were influenced by Stravinsky, Bartók, and Hindemith.

== Early career ==
Miller was born in East Chicago, Indiana. At an early age he learned banjo and played it in the high school band. At sixteen he joined the Musicians Union and began to play professionally. In 1927 he switched to guitar, performing mostly dixieland with bands in Indiana and Michigan. He moved to Chicago in the early 1930s and worked as a drummer and string bassist. At this time he started experimenting with the vibraphone. He worked with bands around Chicago, playing guitar, piano, and vibes, including with pianist Frank Melrose and drummer Dave Tough. He went on tour as a guitarist and vibraphonist for the Vincent Lopez Orchestra with Betty Hutton as vocalist. In 1937, at age 26, he left Lopez to become musical director at WIND radio in Chicago, where he stayed for two years, performing 21 live shows a week, often his compositions.

== Work with Anita O'Day ==
In 1939 he performed at Carl Cons' Off Beat Club with Anita O'Day as vocalist. He is credited as hiring O'Day for her first singing job. This is documented in her autobiography, High Times/Hard Times. They worked together again in 1948, including the Rag Doll in Chicago, the Continental in Milwaukee, the Flame in St. Paul, again in Chicago in 1949, and in other clubs during the 1950s. In a 1958 interview she said, "My musical co-worker since 1939. To me, Max Miller is the swingin' end. I'd love to do an album with Max."

== Meeting Bechet ==
His quintet performed at the Three Deuces club in 1940 until the club burned down later that year. Alto saxophonist Johnny Bothwell was a member of the group. He became musical director for the Boyd Raeburn Band. In 1943 he co-led a quartet with trumpeter Shorty Sherock that included Jimmy Raney on guitar.

Miller met Sidney Bechet in 1944 when he, Smith, and Paul Edward Miller traveled to Springfield to hear Bechet perform. They sat in with the band into the night. Miller became friends with Bechet, and they recorded together; their first recording sessions were in 1944 and included Tony Parenti on clarinet, Zilner Randolph on trumpet, Bill Funkey on alto and tenor sax, and Ken Smith on drums. Billboard magazine's December 15, 1945 issue reviewed Miller's concert with Bechet and Parenti.

In 1945 he became the first jazz musician to perform at Chicago's Orchestra Hall, primarily presenting his compositions, with Muggsy Spanier part of his group. On October 13, 1946, he performed in a concert presented by Green Recordings at the Civic Opera House as pianist for the Dizzy Gillespie Quintet, the Sidney Bechet Sextet, and his trio. The concert featured Bud Freeman, Jimmy McPartland. and George Barnes. During Bechet's visit to Chicago, Miller booked time in Bachman Studios on Carmen Avenue and recorded private sessions with him. In 1947 he spent a year and a half working in California, with engagements at the Swanee Inn, the Red Feather, Angelino's, and the Haig. He returned to Chicago to perform at the Blue Note, then worked in Milwaukee and Minneapolis.

== 1950s ==
In 1950 he recorded at least six songs for Life Record Company. This was primarily original material that he had performed at the Orchestra Hall concert, including "Heartbeat Blues", "Sunny Disposition", "Fantasia of the Unconscious", and "Lumbar Ganglion Jump". In 1951 Columbia released an album of Miller playing jazz standards as part of its "Piano Moods" series. He was backed by Earl Backus on guitar, Bill Holyoke on bass, and Remo Belli (of Remo Drum heads) on drums. In 1952, he returned to Life Records, recording at least four more sides before the company closed. He recorded for Gold Seal Records in the 1950s. He signed to a five-year contract with MCA, but he bought his way out when he learned he would lose the rights to his material.

In 1953 he performed with Bechet. One of their concerts was at the Kimball Hall in Chicago with Miller on piano, Bechet on soprano saxophone, Bill Harris on trombone, and Sid Catlett on drums. The 1954 American Peoples Encyclopedia Yearbook called their reunion the highlight of the year.

Miller continued to record in his studios. He received equipment from top companies due to his column "The Audio Workshop" in DownBeat magazine. He recorded with Bill Harris and Chubby Jackson and compiled many live recordings due to his club dates and concerts.

Benny Goodman chose Miller as vibraphonist for the "Pace of Chicago" television show filmed at the Garrick Theater in April 1952. Miller shared the bill of the Paris Club Revue with jazz singer Joe Williams and trumpeter King Kolax.

In 1956 he opened his club, "Max Miller's Scene" in the 2100 block on N. Clark St. in Chicago at the site of the 1929 Saint Valentine's Day Massacre. He formed a duo with violinist Eddie South and performed with violinist Stuff Smith. He shared billing with Mel Torme and then with Oscar Pettiford. At the Blue Note in Chicago, he played intermission piano opposite the Woody Herman Band. He worked with Coleman Hawkins at the Panther Room in Chicago as members of Paul Jordan's band. In 1959 he was at London House with Bobby Hackett for two weeks.

== Death ==
Max Miller died in Shawnee, Oklahoma in 1985 four days before his 74th birthday after a long fight with congestive heart failure.

== Awards and honors ==
In 1940, Down Beat magazine listed him at number 20 in the Small Combos category. He was mentioned in Esquire's 1944 Jazz Book and was compared to Lionel Hampton and Red Norvo. In 1945 he was No. 2 in the Esquire All American Band New Stars category for vibraharp. In 1946 he listed seventh among pianists in Esquire, under Erroll Garner and above Count Basie, James P. Johnson, and Jay McShann. He won the Esquire New Star poll by Earl Hines and Red Norvo. He placed in the Top Ten of the Other Instruments category for vibes. These poll standings are from Esquire's 1946 Jazz Book.

Studs Terkel called him "The Angry Man of Jazz", saying that he demanded rather than coaxed certain sounds from his instruments. Record producer John H. Hammond called him an "astonishing artist, second only to Lionel Hampton in proficiency". Paul Edward Miller (no relation), former music critic, writer, and editor of Esquire Jazz Books, called Miller "a champion of good jazz". The Who's Who of Jazz by John Chilton listed him as one of the leading figures on the Chicago jazz scene for many years.

== Discography ==
=== Albums ===
Piano Moods (Columbia, 1951)

=== Singles ===
- "Heartbeat Blues" (Life 1950)
- "Caravan" (Life, 1950)
- "Fantasia of the Unconscious" Part 1 (Life, 1950)
- "Fantasia of the Unconscious" Part 2 (Life, 1950)
- "Lumbar Ganglion Jump" (Life, 1950)
- "Sunny Disposition" (Life, 1950)
- "Jazz Me Blues" (Life, 1952)
- "Tea for Two" (Life, 1952)
- "Only You" (Life, 1952)
- "Cross Me off Your List" (Life, 1952)
