= The Batman/Superman Hour =

American animated television series

- Title card
- Genre: Superhero; Action; Adventure
- Based on: Batman by: Bob Kane; Bill Finger; Superman by: Jerry Siegel; Joe Shuster
- Written by: Oscar Bensol; Dennis Marks; Bob Kane; Jerry Robinson; Joe Shuster; Jerry Siegel
- Directed by: Hal Sutherland
- Voices of: Olan Soule; Casey Kasem; Jane Webb; Ted Knight; Larry Storch; Bud Collyer; Bob Hastings; Jackson Beck; Jack Grimes; Joan Alexander
- Narrated by: Ted Knight
- Theme music composer: John Gart
- Country of origin: United States
- Original language: English
- No. of episodes: 34

Production
- Executive producer: Allen Ducovny
- Producers: Norm Prescott; Lou Scheimer
- Running time: 60/30 minutes
- Production companies: Filmation; National Periodical Publications

Original release
- Release: September 14, 1968 – January 4, 1969

The Batman/Superman Hour is a Filmation animated series that was broadcast on CBS from 1968 to 1969. Premiering on September 14, 1968, this 60-minute program featured new adventures of the DC Comics superheroes Batman, Robin and Batgirl alongside shorts from The New Adventures of Superman and The Adventures of Superboy.

== Series overview ==
This series marked the animation debut of Batman, his supporting cast and some of their classic enemies like Joker, Penguin, Riddler, Catwoman, Mr. Freeze, Scarecrow, Mad Hatter, and some villains exclusive to the series.

The success of The Superman/Aquaman Hour of Adventure in 1967 had prompted Filmation to produce a Metamorpho pilot and begin development on other similar series. These plans were cancelled when CBS secured the animation rights to Batman in the wake of ABC's recent success with the Batman live action television series. Going into production close to the start of the 1968 TV season, what would become The Batman/Superman Hour required Filmation to pull as many additional animators from other projects as they could spare to ramp up production.

This series was the first time Olan Soule and Casey Kasem performed as the voices of Batman and Robin. When The New Adventures of Batman was produced in 1977, Adam West and Burt Ward reprised the roles they had originally played in the live action TV series. Soule and Kasem would return several times to reprise their roles in 1972's The New Scooby-Doo Movies, 1973's Super Friends, 1977's The All-New Super Friends Hour, 1978's Challenge of the Superfriends, 1979's The World's Greatest SuperFriends, and starting in 1980 Soule voiced the character in the 7 minute shorter episodes that were produced through 1983. These 1980–1983 episodes aired under the generic Super Friends title. Kasem would go on to voice Robin with Adam West as Batman in 1984's Super Friends: The Legendary Super Powers Show and 1985's The Super Powers Team: Galactic Guardians.

In 1969, the series was repackaged into 30-minute episodes for Sunday mornings, without the Superman segments and renamed Batman with Robin the Boy Wonder. Batman would next appear in The New Adventures of Batman in 1977. In 1985, Warner Home Video released five selected episodes of the series on VHS as part of the "Super Powers" video collection. These videos were re-released in 1996 and are out of print. In 1996, episodes were included in The Superman/Batman Adventures on the USA Network. They later aired on the Cartoon Network and Boomerang.

== Episodes ==
The Superman portion of the program consisted of new 6 1/2-minute shorts from Filmation's The New Adventures of Superman and The Adventures of Superboy.

The Batman half of The Batman/Superman Hour consisted of new shorts. One story was presented in two 6 1/2 minute segments and one story in a single 6 1/2 minute segment. Thirty-four stories were produced.

== Cast ==
- Olan Soule as Batman, Alfred Pennyworth
- Casey Kasem as Robin, Chief O'Hara, Mayor of Gotham City, Additional Voices
- Jane Webb as Batgirl, Catwoman
- Ted Knight as Narrator (Batman and Superboy segments), James Gordon, Penguin, Riddler, Mr. Freeze, Scarecrow, Mad Hatter, Tweedledum and Tweedledee, Simon the Pieman, Dollman, Judge
- Larry Storch as The Joker
- Bud Collyer as Superman
- Bob Hastings as Superboy / Young Clark Kent
- Jackson Beck as Lex Luthor, Narrator (Superman segments)
- Jack Grimes as Jimmy Olsen
- Joan Alexander and Julie Bennett as Lois Lane

== Production credits ==
- Directed by Hal Sutherland
- Associate directors: Rudy Larriva, Amby Paliwoda, Don Towsley, Lou Zukor
- Art director: Don Christensen
- Storyboard: Sherman Labby, Oscar Dufau, Mike O'Connor, Jan Green, Gary Lund
- Layout: Dan Noonan, Ray Vinella, Herb Hazelton, C.L. Hartman, Jacques Rupp, Ray Jacobs, Kay Wright, Louise Sandoval, Takashi Masunaga, Mike Ploog, Bill Lignante, Marilee Heyer, Alberto DeMello, Dick Preisen, Frank Gonzales, Mel Keefer, Sylvia Mattinson, Kay Wright
- Background director: Erv Kaplan
- Background artists: Paul Xander, Bill Geach, Martin Forte, Jack Healey, Ted Littlefield, Art Lozzi, Jim Jones, Maurice Harvey, Venetia Epler, Bill McArdle, Lorraine Marue, Ann Guenther, Barbara Smith
- Animation: Bill Hajee, Ralph Somerville, Len Rogers, Murray McClellan, Len Redman, James Brummett, Bob Carr, Russ Von Neida, Bob Bransford, Joan Orbison, Bill Pratt, Marshall Lamore, Robert Bentley, Jack Foster, Norm McCabe, George Grandpre, Judy Drake, Bill Reed, Chic Otterstrom, Les Kaluza, Xenia, Bill Hutten, Otto Feuer, Ken Southworth, Jack Ozark, Reuben Timmins, Ed Friedman, Butch Davis, Virgil Raddatz, Bob Trochim, Virgil Ross, Tom McDonald, David Tendlar, Bob Matz, Paul Krukowski, Dick Hall
- Camera supervision: Roger Brown
- Camera: Ray Lee, Ron LaPeer, Gary Milton, Sergio Antonio Alcazar, Roger Sims
- Editorial: Joseph Simon
- Negative cutting: June Gilham
- Sound effects: Enfeld Mahana Corp.
- Prints by Technicolor
- Production coordinator: Rock Benedict
- Checking supervisor: Marion Turk
- Ink and paint supervision: Martha Buckley
- Voices: Bud Collyer (Clark Kent/Superman); Bob Hastings (Superboy); Ted Knight (Narrator/all Batman villains); Joan Alexander (Lois Lane); Casey Kasem (Dick Grayson/Robin); Jackson Beck (Lex Luthor); Olan Soule (Bruce Wayne/Batman); Jack Grimes (James "Jimmy" Olsen); Jane Webb (Barbara Gordon/Batgirl; all villainesses); Cliff Owens
- Background music: John Gart
- Executive producer: Allen Ducovny
- Produced by Norm Prescott, Lou Scheimer

== See also ==
- The New Adventures of Batman
- The Batman/Tarzan Adventure Hour
