= Aquaman (TV series) =

American animated television series

- Genre: Superhero; Adventure
- Based on: Aquaman by: Paul Norris; Mort Weisinger
- Developed by: Lou Scheimer
- Country of origin: United States
- No. of episodes: 36

Production
- Executive producers: Norm Prescott; Lou Scheimer
- Running time: 30 minutes
- Production company: Filmation

Original release
- Network: CBS
- Release: September 9, 1967 – June 1970

Aquaman is an American animated series from Filmation that premiered on CBS on September 9, 1967, and ended in June 1970. It is a 30-minute version of The Superman/Aquaman Hour of Adventure, repackaged without the Superman and Superboy segments.

The show is composed of previously aired adventures featuring the DC Comics superheroes Aquaman (voiced by Marvin Miller) and his sidekick Aqualad (voiced by Jerry Dexter). There were also segments featuring the Atom, the Flash and Kid Flash, the Green Lantern and Hawkman, as well as team-ups with the Justice League of America and Teen Titans. The series was narrated by Ted Knight, with Marvin Miller voicing most of the villains.

Aquaman's wife Mera also appeared occasionally. Aquaman rode his seahorse Storm, and Aqualad was accompanied by a sea pony, Imp, and his pet, Tusky.

== Episodes ==
Thirty-six Aquaman segments were produced for The Superman/Aquaman Hour of Adventure, plus 18 segments featuring other superheroes.

== Home video ==
Aquaman

In recent years, Aquaman episodes have been seen as part of Cartoon Network's Boomerang. In 1985, Warner Home Video released eight selected Aquaman episodes of the series on VHS in the "Super Powers" video collection along with Batman, Superboy and Superman. These videos were rereleased in 1996 and are now out of production. In October 2007, Warner Home Video (via DC Entertainment and Warner Bros. Family Entertainment) released The Adventures of Aquaman: The Complete Collection on DVD in Region 1; the 2-disc set features all 36 Aquaman segments from the series and was presented in its original, uncut broadcast presentation and original airdate order, as well as special features, including a retrospective featurette titled Aquaman: The Sovereign of the Seas, which explores Aquaman's depiction in various media and how his character and superheroic capabilities have progressed over the years.
