= The New Adventures of Superman (TV series) =

1966-1970 American animated television series

- Genre: Superhero
- Based on: Superman by: Jerry Siegel; Joe Shuster
- Developed by: Lou Scheimer
- Directed by: Hal Sutherland
- Voices of: Bud Collyer; Ted Knight; Joan Alexander; Julie Bennett; Jackson Beck; Jack Grimes
- Narrated by: Jackson Beck
- Theme music composer: John Gart (credited as "John Marion")
- Country of origin: United States
- Original language: English
- No. of seasons: 4
- No. of episodes: 68

Production
- Producers: Lou Scheimer; Norm Prescott
- Production companies: Filmation; National Periodical Publications

Original release
- Network: CBS
- Release: September 10, 1966 – September 5, 1970

Related
- The Adventures of Superboy (TV series); The Superman/Aquaman Hour of Adventure; The Batman/Superman Hour

The New Adventures of Superman is an American series of six-minute animated Superman adventures produced by Filmation that were broadcast Saturday mornings on CBS from September 10, 1966, to September 5, 1970. The 68 segments appeared as part of three different programs during that time, packaged with similar shorts featuring The Adventures of Superboy and other DC Comics superheroes.

== History ==
=== Background ===
Fred Silverman, newly hired as head of CBS' daytime programming, felt that a new Superman TV series could be popular if it were in animated form. His plan was to make it part of the broader "superhero morning" initiative for Saturday mornings he was spearheading.

Silverman contacted National Periodical Publications to buy the broadcast rights to a Superman animated series. Mort Weisinger, editor of the Superman comics, called his acquaintance Norm Prescott to see if his company Filmation Associates was willing to either develop such a series for $36,000 per half hour of content, or refer him to another animation studio. Filmation was on the verge of closure at the time, with Lou Scheimer and Hal Sutherland as its only employees, so they accepted the terms. When National Periodical sent a representative to look at Filmation's operation, Scheimer had 20 of his friends in the animation business come to the Filmation studio during their lunch breaks and pretend to work there. The ploy worked and National Periodicals signed the deal, enabling Filmation to actually hire some of its fake staff.

=== Production ===
In contrast to Hanna-Barbera, who would either buy a property outright or create a similar one free of any sort of partner, Filmation established many partnerships in their projects. Moreover, National Periodicals wanted to maintain creative control over the series, so the scripts for The New Adventures of Superman were written by DC Comics writers, including George Kashdan, Leo Dorfman and Bob Haney. Many of the character designs (based upon the artwork of Superman artist Curt Swan in the show's third season) stayed true to their comic book counterparts; iconic shirt-rip shots and related transformations from Clark Kent into Superman were incorporated into almost every episode, and such lines as "Up, up, and away!" and "This is a job for Superman!" were borrowed from the Superman radio series. In addition, this series marked the animation debuts of Jimmy Olsen and the Superman villains Lex Luthor, Brainiac, Toyman, Prankster, Titano, and Mister Mxyzptlk, as well as the inclusion of new villains like the Warlock and the Sorcerer. Stock animation was often re-used for sequences that occurred repeatedly, such as characters running, Superman flying or punching, and Clark Kent switching identities into Superman. This system served three major purposes: it made it easier to adjust episode length, since stock sequences could be added or removed with minimal time and effort; it appealed to younger viewers, who like to see familiar animations repeated; and it kept production costs down, since it was cheaper than creating new versions of the same sequence. Character movement was often kept at a minimum, which was typical of Filmation's animated productions.

The first season used a format of three seven-minute stories in each half-hour time slot, specifically two Superman segments and one Superboy and Krypto segment. CBS preferred this format because the stories were not interrupted by commercial breaks, and it was easier for the DC Comics writers, none of whom had real experience with the half-hour story format.

Scheimer, who was the show's producer, recruited Bud Collyer and Joan Alexander, veterans of the Superman radio show and the Max Fleischer Superman cartoons, for the voices of Clark Kent / Superman and Lois Lane respectively. Jackson Beck, who had narrated, and provided the character voice of Perry White on the radio show, reprised those roles for the cartoon version, while Jack Grimes, who had played Jimmy Olsen in its later years, took that part on The New Adventures of Superman as well. Moreover, during the first season the voice tracks were recorded in New York City at the same studio where the radio show was recorded, except for the Superboy segments, which were recorded in Burbank, California. As in the Fleischer cartoons and on the radio show, while in the identity of Clark Kent, Collyer would keep his voice lighter, and transitioned to a heroic baritone when changing into Superman. Alexander departed after the first season and was replaced by Julie Bennett in later seasons. The theme music for the show was composed by John Marion Gart. Weisinger acted as story consultant for the animated series, and made sure to include characters from his era, like Titano and Brainiac.

The show was retitled The Superman/Aquaman Hour of Adventure for its second season, and National Periodicals increased the budget to $50,000 per episode. Filmation also started producing bumpers with children's activities such as secret codes to keep viewers watching during commercial breaks.

For season 3 the show was again retitled to The Superman/Batman Hour, and National Periodicals again increased the budget, this time to $60,000 per episode.

=== Broadcast ===
The first TV series produced by Filmation Associates, The New Adventures of Superman was extremely popular in its Saturday morning time slot. During its first season it shared the time slot with The New Casper Cartoon Show and Cool McCool, neither of which even came close to its ratings. In season 2 it was the highest-rated show on Saturdays, with an 8.9 Nielsen rating.

The series was one of several that sparked the anger of Action for Children's Television, a grassroots organization formed in 1968 and dedicated to improving the quality of television programming offered to children, due to Superman throwing punches and other action-related violence which the group found objectionable. The series was cancelled not long thereafter, and future cartoons de-emphasized such comic book violence. Silverman, however, said that ratings for superhero cartoons in general had begun to slip by the end of the 1960s and that declining ratings were a greater deciding factor than parental advocacy groups for causing these series to be phased out.

Following the cancellation, Filmation produced two final Superman animated spots for the newly debuted TV series Sesame Street, as well as a Superman guest appearance on a 1972 episode of their show The Brady Kids, in both cases with Lennie Weinrib now voicing Superman. Superman subsequently appeared in ABC's long-running animated series Super Friends (1973), produced by Hanna-Barbera, whose rights to DC Comics characters were gradually transferred from Filmation. In August 1972, Warner Bros. TV made a deal for ownership of the worldwide syndication rights to the entire run of Filmation's Superman, Batman, and Aquaman series in perpetuity.

== Episode list ==
=== Season 1 (1966–67) ===
The series premiered on September 10, 1966 as a "30-minute" program titled The New Adventures of Superman, featuring two Superman segments with one The Adventures of Superboy short in between.

Thirty-six Superman segments were produced that season:

No. overall	No. in season	Title	Directed by	Written by	Original release date
1–1	1	"The Force Phantom"	Hal Sutherland, Anatole Kirsanoff	Oscar Bensol, Mort Weisinger	September 10, 1966
An alien ship uses an energy creature to attack Earth.
1–3	2	"The Mermen of Emor"	Hal Sutherland, Anatole Kirsanoff	Oscar Bensol, Mort Weisinger	September 10, 1966
Scuba divers are captured for sport by malevolent fish beings led by Triton.
2–1	3	"The Prehistoric Pterodactyls" *	Hal Sutherland, Anatole Kirsanoff	Oscar Bensol, Mort Weisinger	September 17, 1966
Two giant flying monsters are freed from frozen suspension.
2–3	4	"Merlin's Magic Marbles"	Hal Sutherland, Anatole Kirsanoff	Mort Weisinger	September 17, 1966
Lex Luthor uses a temporal communicator to discover magic powers.
3–1	5	"The Threat of the Thrutans"	Hal Sutherland, Anatole Kirsanoff	Oscar Bensol, Mort Weisinger	September 24, 1966
An alien space probe trapped in Earth orbit uses force to try to return to its home galaxy.
3–3	6	"The Wicked Warlock"	Hal Sutherland, Anatole Kirsanoff	Mort Weisinger	September 24, 1966
A male witch called the Warlock must seize a sorcerer's ruby, a rare gem that contains powerful magic.
4–1	7	"The Chimp Who Made It Big" *	Hal Sutherland, Anatole Kirsanoff	Ross Braddock, Mort Weisinger	October 1, 1966
The fusion of two irradiated pieces of space debris fatefully changes a chimpanzee named Toto on board a space craft. When the capsule containing the space craft lands on Earth, the chimpanzee ends up turning into Titano the Super-Ape. Despite Titano causing destruction (and grabbing Lois), Superman must convince the military not to open fire as he thinks he can revert Titano to Toto.
4–3	8	"The Deadly Icebergs"	Hal Sutherland, Anatole Kirsanoff	J.W. Doctor, Mort Weisinger	October 1, 1966
Saboteurs have rigged gigantic icebergs with explosives to rob a luxury liner.
5–1	9	"The Robot of Riga"	Hal Sutherland, Anatole Kirsanoff	Oscar Bensol, Mort Weisinger	October 8, 1966
Lois Lane and Jimmy Olsen are kidnapped by alien hunters whose "zoo" is protected by a giant robot.
5–3	10	"The Invisible Raiders"	Hal Sutherland, Anatole Kirsanoff	Mort Weisinger	October 8, 1966
The Sorcerer, a malevolent wizard, uses hirelings using an invisibility field to commit crimes.
6–1	11	"The Neolithic Nightmare"	Hal Sutherland, Anatole Kirsanoff	Oscar Bensol, Mort Weisinger	October 15, 1966
Jimmy Olsen falls into an underground pocket populated by malevolent creatures.
6–3	12	"The Return of Brainiac" *	Hal Sutherland, Anatole Kirsanoff	Mort Weisinger	October 15, 1966
An alien computer named Brainiac has been capturing different kinds of animals by shrinking them. Brainiac is taking the tiny animals to his dying homeworld on his spaceship a la Noah's Ark. When he also must find a man and woman for repopulation, Brainiac ends up shrinking and capturing Superman and Lois.
7–1	13	"The Magnetic Monster"	Hal Sutherland, Anatole Kirsanoff	Oscar Bensol, Mort Weisinger	October 22, 1966
A magnetic device that melts metal objects is used by alien beings on Earth.
7–3	14	"The Toys of Doom"	Hal Sutherland, Anatole Kirsanoff	Mort Weisinger	October 22, 1966
Phoning in an anonymous tip to lure Lois Lane and Jimmy Olsen to an abandoned factory on the outskirts of Metropolis, the Toyman captures Lois and Jimmy to help launch a wave of crime and keep Superman away.
8–1	15	"The Iron Eater" *	Hal Sutherland, Anatole Kirsanoff	Oscar Bensol, Mort Weisinger	October 29, 1966
A shape-shifting alien creature that emerged from a fallen meteorite and devours iron structures raises havoc.
8–3	16	"The Ape Army of the Amazon"	Hal Sutherland, Anatole Kirsanoff	Mort Weisinger	October 29, 1966
In South America, an exiled military officer named Colonel Vasta and a disgraced scientist named Dr. Rucas control apes, with the transmitter on Dr. Rucas's back, in a plot to rob an underground treasure. Lois is caught, tied to a pillar and gagged, and Rucas activates an Inca statue to crush her.
9–1	17	"The Fire Phantom"	Hal Sutherland, Anatole Kirsanoff	Oscar Bensol, Mort Weisinger	November 5, 1966
A living flame from Earth's core appears and sets off a mammoth forest fire.
9–3	18	"The Deadly Dish" *	Hal Sutherland, Anatole Kirsanoff	Oscar Bensol, Mort Weisinger	November 5, 1966
Lex Luthor traps Lois, Jimmy, and Perry White so he can lure Superman into range of a kryptonite transmitter.
10–1	19	"Insect Raiders"	Hal Sutherland, Anatole Kirsanoff	Mort Weisinger	November 12, 1966
Criminals who have perfected insect powers must stop Superman from foiling their wave of crime.
10–3	20	"Return of Warlock"	Hal Sutherland, Anatole Kirsanoff	Oscar Bensol, Mort Weisinger	November 12, 1966
The Warlock steals another sorcerer's ruby to wreak havoc on Superman's friends.
11–1	21	"The Abominable Iceman" *	Hal Sutherland, Anatole Kirsanoff	William Woolfolk, Mort Weisinger	November 19, 1966
An ice being freezes tropical Hawaii where Lois Lane is having her vacation.
11–3	22	"The Men from A.P.E."	Hal Sutherland, Anatole Kirsanoff	Mort Weisinger	November 19, 1966
Lex Luthor, the Warlock, the Toyman, and the Prankster form the organization A.P.E. (short for Allied Perpetrators of Evil) and combine their powers to defeat Superman.
12–1	23	"The Tree Man of Arbora"	Hal Sutherland, Anatole Kirsanoff	Mort Weisinger	November 26, 1966
A tree being brought to life near a meteor crater consumes enormous quantities of water.
12–3	24	"The Image Maker" *	Hal Sutherland, Anatole Kirsanoff	Mort Weisinger	November 26, 1966
A master criminal scientist named Luna (a.k.a. Professor Leo Nula) captures Lois in order to send her into space within his 4D movie as part of his revenge on her for sending him to prison seven years ago.
13–1	25	"Superman's Double Trouble"	Hal Sutherland, Anatole Kirsanoff	Mort Weisinger	December 3, 1966
A mid-ocean earthquake releases a giant lobster and a giant alligator.
13–3	26	"The Deadly Super-Doll"	Hal Sutherland, Anatole Kirsanoff	Mort Weisinger	December 3, 1966
The Sorcerer uses a voodoo doll to stop Superman.
14–1	27	"Lava Men" *	Hal Sutherland, Anatole Kirsanoff	William Finger	December 10, 1966
In Mexico, a volcano creates living beings of lava.
14–3	28	"Luthor Strikes Again"	Hal Sutherland, Anatole Kirsanoff	Mort Weisinger	December 10, 1966
Lex Luthor uses Jimmy Olsen as bait to use kryptonite laser beam weapons against Superman in a paint factory.
15–1	29	"Mission to Planet Peril"	Hal Sutherland, Anatole Kirsanoff	Mort Weisinger	December 17, 1966
Alien raiders forced to Earth recruit Superman to rescue hostages on their home world.
15–3	30	"The Pernicious Parasite"	Hal Sutherland, Anatole Kirsanoff	Oscar Bensol, Mort Weisinger	December 17, 1966
While breaking into a science lab, a petty criminal named I. C. Harris is exposed to a radioactive isotope and achieves power to drain physical strength from other men. With his new power, he aims to become a "Superman of Crime", but when he discovers the real Superman, Harris's unstoppable greed for physical power proves fatal. NOTE: Though the series pre-dated Crisis on Infinite Earths, Harris is not to be confused with the Parasite of the Pre-Crisis DC Comics, whose origin story was essentially the same.
16–1	31	"The Two Faces of Superman"	Hal Sutherland, Anatole Kirsanoff	Mort Weisinger	December 24, 1966
The Toyman creates a robot doppelganger of the Man of Steel.
16–3	32	"The Imp-Practical Joker"	Hal Sutherland, Anatole Kirsanoff	Oscar Bensol, Mort Weisinger	December 24, 1966
A carnival is raided by an extra-dimensional prankster known as Mister Mxyzptlk.
17–1	33	"Superman Meets Brainiac" *	Hal Sutherland, Anatole Kirsanoff	Oscar Bensol, Mort Weisinger	December 31, 1966
Brainiac raids Earth to gather creatures to repopulate a planet devastated by atomic wars.
17–3	34	"Seeds of Disaster"	Hal Sutherland, Anatole Kirsanoff	Arnold Drake, Mort Weisinger	December 31, 1966
Alien seed pods grow plants that destroy other objects.
18–1	35	"The Malevolent Mummy" *	Hal Sutherland, Anatole Kirsanoff	Oscar Bensol, Mort Weisinger	January 7, 1967
An Egyptian sorcerer in mummified form attacks Lois and Superman.
18–3	36	"The Birdmen from Lost Valley"	Hal Sutherland, Anatole Kirsanoff	Mort Weisinger	January 7, 1967
Avian beings from a lost valley must raid outside farmlands for survival because a gold raider named Trask and his henchmen hold their populace hostage.

Episodes marked with an asterisk (*) denote episodes in which Julie Bennett voices Lois Lane.

=== Season 2: The Superman/Aquaman Hour of Adventure (1967–68) ===
The Superman/Aquaman Hour of Adventure was first broadcast on September 9, 1967. This 60-minute program included new Superman segments, and adventures featuring Aquaman and his sidekick Aqualad. It also comprised a rotating series of cartoons featuring the Flash and Kid Flash, Green Lantern, Hawkman, the Atom, the Justice League of America, and the Teen Titans (Speedy, Kid Flash, Wonder Girl and Aqualad), and new Superboy shorts.

Sixteen Superman segments were produced that season:

No. overall	No. in season	Title	Directed by	Written by	Original release date
19–1	1	"A.P.E. Strikes Again"	Hal Sutherland, Rudy Larriva, Amby Paliwoda, Don Towsley, Lou Zukor	Oscar Bensol	September 9, 1967
Lex Luthor, Brainiac, and the Warlock come together again as A.P.E. in a plot to steal a crime-detecting computer.
19–3	2	"The Lethal Lightning Bug"	Hal Sutherland, Rudy Larriva, Amby Paliwoda, Don Towsley, Lou Zukor	Oscar Bensol	September 9, 1967
A lightning storm irradiates a lightning bug to create a gigantic energy creature.
20–1	3	"The Prankster"	Hal Sutherland, Rudy Larriva, Amby Paliwoda, Don Towsley, Lou Zukor	Oscar Bensol	September 16, 1967
A petty nuisance called the Prankster creates havoc until Superman uses some tricks of his own.
20–3	4	"The Saboteurs"	Hal Sutherland, Rudy Larriva, Amby Paliwoda, Don Towsley, Lou Zukor	Oscar Bensol	September 16, 1967
Lois and Clark are captured on a freighter by criminals dumping radioactive waste into Metropolis harbor.
21–1	5	"The Wisp of Wickedness"	Hal Sutherland, Rudy Larriva, Amby Paliwoda, Don Towsley, Lou Zukor	Oscar Bensol	September 23, 1967
The spiritual essence of an alien warlord snares innocent men on Earth.
21–3	6	"Superman Meets His Match"	Hal Sutherland, Rudy Larriva, Amby Paliwoda, Don Towsley, Lou Zukor	George Kashdan	September 23, 1967
A kryptonite meteor crashes into the ocean and releases a giant creature with the same powers as Superman.
22–1	7	"Night of the Octopod"	Hal Sutherland, Rudy Larriva, Amby Paliwoda, Don Towsley, Lou Zukor	Oscar Bensol	September 30, 1967
An unmanned alien probe that resembles a metal octopus attacks Earth near Niagara Falls. After its first defeat, an electric eel reactivates it.
22–3	8	"Brainiac's Bubbles"	Hal Sutherland, Rudy Larriva, Amby Paliwoda, Don Towsley, Lou Zukor	Oscar Bensol	September 30, 1967
Doctor Heckla, the creator of Brainiac, creates powerful bubbles with which he can capture Earth creatures, including Lois Lane and Superman.
23–1	9	"War of the Bee Battalion"	Hal Sutherland, Rudy Larriva, Amby Paliwoda, Don Towsley, Lou Zukor	George Kashdan	October 7, 1967
Criminals force a scientist who has created a growth ray for honeybees to use the device to attack Metropolis.
23–3	10	"The Toyman's Super Toy"	Hal Sutherland, Rudy Larriva, Amby Paliwoda, Don Towsley, Lou Zukor	George Kashdan	October 7, 1967
The Toyman and his henchman use a gigantic insect robot fitted with a kryptonite beam weapon against Superman at a nuclear facility.
24–1	11	"The Cage of Glass"	Hal Sutherland, Rudy Larriva, Amby Paliwoda, Don Towsley, Lou Zukor	Oscar Bensol	October 14, 1967
Brainiac shrinks Metropolis itself to minuscule size and imprisons the city in glass for return to Doctor Heckla's homeworld.
24–3	12	"The Atomic Superman"	Hal Sutherland, Rudy Larriva, Amby Paliwoda, Don Towsley, Lou Zukor	Winston Lyon	October 14, 1967
When Superman innocently tests a powerful liquid fuel by drinking it at the request of a scientist friend, the liquid creates an atomic fire raging inside his body that makes him blast out fire whenever he opens his mouth, forcing him into exile.
25–1	13	"Luthor's Loco Looking Glass"	Hal Sutherland, Rudy Larriva, Amby Paliwoda, Don Towsley, Lou Zukor	Oscar Bensol	October 21, 1967
Lex Luthor invents a mirror that can transport people to his hideout at an abandoned amusement park and with it traps Jimmy Olsen.
25–3	14	"The Warlock's Revenge"	Hal Sutherland, Rudy Larriva, Amby Paliwoda, Don Towsley, Lou Zukor	Oscar Bensol	October 21, 1967
The Warlock's sister frees him from prison and he launches an all-out campaign against Lois Lane.
26–1	15	"The Halyah of the Himalayas"	Hal Sutherland, Rudy Larriva, Amby Paliwoda, Don Towsley, Lou Zukor	Oscar Bensol	October 28, 1967
A giant ice creature in Asia assaults the mountainous regions of India and Pakistan.
26–3	16	"Luthor's Fatal Fireworks"	Hal Sutherland, Rudy Larriva, Amby Paliwoda, Don Towsley, Lou Zukor	Oscar Bensol, Mort Weisinger	October 28, 1967
Lex Luthor captures Jimmy Olsen to lure Superman to the West Coast where he unleashes a bombardment of fireworks laced with kryptonite.

Julie Bennett voices Lois Lane in three episodes - "The Prankster", "The Saboteurs" and "War of the Bee Battalion".

=== Season 3: The Batman/Superman Hour (1968–69) ===
The Batman/Superman Hour premiered on September 14, 1968, featuring new two-part Superman segments alongside new Superboy shorts and the adventures of Batman, Robin and Batgirl.

Sixteen Superman segments were produced that season:

No. overall	No. in season	Title	Directed by	Written by	Original release date
27–1	1	"Luthor's Lethal Laser: Part 1"	Hal Sutherland, Rudy Larriva, Amby Paliwoda, Don Towsley, Lou Zukor	Oscar Bensol	September 14, 1968
Jimmy Olsen and Lois Lane discover a spacecraft in a nearby canyon, but are captured by Lex Luthor, who flies to the moon to set up a giant laser cannon to attack Earth.
27–3	2	"Luthor's Lethal Laser: Part 2"	Hal Sutherland, Rudy Larriva, Amby Paliwoda, Don Towsley, Lou Zukor	Oscar Bensol	September 14, 1968
When Superman rescues Lois and Jimmy, Lex Luthor escapes and teams up with Brainiac to set a trap.
28–1	3	"Can a Luthor Change His Spots?: Part 1"	Hal Sutherland, Rudy Larriva, Amby Paliwoda, Don Towsley, Lou Zukor	Bob Haney	September 21, 1968
To the disbelief of Jimmy Olsen, Lex Luthor has convinced Perry White that he has gone straight, and has thus become the Daily Planet's science editor with a huge experimental lab in the Planet building. Jimmy's disbelief leads him to try and catch Luthor in a deception, but his efforts lead to disasters.
28–3	4	"Can a Luthor Change His Spots?: Part 2"	Hal Sutherland, Rudy Larriva, Amby Paliwoda, Don Towsley, Lou Zukor	Bob Haney	September 21, 1968
Thinking he catches Lex Luthor in a bank robbery, Jimmy Olsen jumps Luthor and closes a bank vault, trapping Perry White and the Metropolis Police Chief, before a bigger disaster strikes the Planet building itself.
29–1	5	"The Team of Terror: Part 1"	Hal Sutherland, Rudy Larriva, Amby Paliwoda, Don Towsley, Lou Zukor	Oscar Bensol	September 28, 1968
The exiled Queen Satana from the planet Quanta flies to Earth to drain nuclear energy for use in making plastic objects called Plasto whose molecular structure can be telepathically altered.
29–3	6	"The Team of Terror: Part 2"	Hal Sutherland, Rudy Larriva, Amby Paliwoda, Don Towsley, Lou Zukor	Oscar Bensol	September 28, 1968
To shake off Superman after he thwarts her efforts, Queen Satana teams with the Warlock to destroy Superman while she unleashes nuclear warfare on Quanta.
30–1	7	"Rain of Iron: Part 1"	Hal Sutherland, Rudy Larriva, Amby Paliwoda, Don Towsley, Lou Zukor	Oscar Bensol	October 5, 1968
Ostensibly on vacation, Lois Lane follows an associate of a fugitive scientist to the southwestern Pacific, while Metropolis is suddenly attacked by giant balls of solid iron plummeting from space.
30–3	8	"Rain of Iron: Part 2"	Hal Sutherland, Rudy Larriva, Amby Paliwoda, Don Towsley, Lou Zukor	Oscar Bensol	October 5, 1968
The fugitive scientist has created a gigantic cannon to launch iron spheres onto Metropolis and has taken island natives hostage to thwart Superman.
31–1	9	"The Mysterious Mr. Mist: Part 1"	Hal Sutherland, Rudy Larriva, Amby Paliwoda, Don Towsley, Lou Zukor	Unknown	October 12, 1968
A being made of a mist-like substance emerges from an old water well on Perry White's farm, and can transform into a perfect duplicate of any human by absorbing into a person's abandoned clothing. He binds and gags Lois Lane, planning to take her through a well to the Underworld.
31–3	10	"The Mysterious Mr. Mist: Part 2"	Hal Sutherland, Rudy Larriva, Amby Paliwoda, Don Towsley, Lou Zukor	Unknown	October 12, 1968
The mist being repeatedly attempts to kidnap Lois Lane to make her the queen of his underground society. He puts her in a sack and again ties her up at the top of a building, but Superman uses a vacuum to catch him, then saves Lois from falling.
32–1	11	"Luminians on the Loose: Part 1"	Hal Sutherland, Rudy Larriva, Amby Paliwoda, Don Towsley, Lou Zukor	Oscar Bensol	October 19, 1968
Lex Luthor has created a laser beam transmitter with which he transports two fire beings from a distant star to help him defeat Superman.
32–3	12	"Luminians on the Loose: Part 2"	Hal Sutherland, Rudy Larriva, Amby Paliwoda, Don Towsley, Lou Zukor	Oscar Bensol	October 19, 1968
When the fire beings turn on him, Lex Luthor must team with Superman to stop them. Meanwhile, the Lumiaians use Lex's transmitter to get a battalion of Luminians to invade Earth.
33–1	13	"The Ghost of Kilbane Castle: Part 1"	Hal Sutherland, Rudy Larriva, Amby Paliwoda, Don Towsley, Lou Zukor	Oscar Bensol	October 26, 1968
In Scotland, Lois and Jimmy run afoul of two twin brothers whose ancestors stole the castle in which they live, and the ghost of the castle's original ruler has emerged for revenge.
33–3	14	"The Ghost of Kilbane Castle: Part 2"	Hal Sutherland, Rudy Larriva, Amby Paliwoda, Don Towsley, Lou Zukor	Oscar Bensol	October 26, 1968
Superman teams with the Kilbane ghost to defeat the two evil twins. They have Lois and Jimmy tied up and gagged above spikes on a tower wall, and threaten to cut them loose if Superman tries to stop them.
34–1	15	"The Japanese Sandman: Part 1"	Hal Sutherland, Rudy Larriva, Amby Paliwoda, Don Towsley, Lou Zukor	Unknown	November 2, 1968
In Yokohama, a shipping magnate's businesses are sabotaged by an explosives factory owner and the man summons a Japanese god to help him defeat the magnate.
34–3	16	"The Japanese Sandman: Part 2"	Hal Sutherland, Rudy Larriva, Amby Paliwoda, Don Towsley, Lou Zukor	Unknown	November 2, 1968
Superman must defeat the Japanese Sandman when he traps the shipping magnate and Jimmy Olsen.

=== Season 4 (1969–70) ===
The New Adventures of Superman returned for one last time on CBS, beginning September 13, 1969. The format was the same as before — a "30-minute" program with two Superman segments and one Superboy segment. All episodes were reruns of those that had previously aired.

== Cast ==
=== Superman segments ===
- Bud Collyer as Kal-El / Clark Kent / Superman
- Jackson Beck as Narrator, Perry White, Beany Martin
- Joan Alexander as Lois Lane
- Ray Owens as Lex Luthor, Warlock
- Jack Grimes as Jimmy Olsen
- Gilbert Mack as Mister Mxyzptlk, Brainiac

=== Superboy segments ===
- Bob Hastings as Superboy
- Ted Knight as Narrator, Jonathan Kent
- Julie Bennett as Martha Kent
- Janet Waldo as Lana Lang

== Production crew ==
- Directed by Hal Sutherland
- Produced by Lou Scheimer and Norm Prescott
- Scripts by George Kashdan
- Based on characters created by Jerome Siegel and Joe Shuster
- Story consultant: Mort Weisinger
- Storyboard artists: Harvey Toombs, Bob Maxfield
- Layouts: Don Christensen, C.L. Hartman, Wes Herschensohn, Ken Hultgren, Raymond Jacobs, Dan Noonan
- Backgrounds: Erv Kaplan, Ted Littlefield, Lorraine Marue, Takashi Masunaga, Paul Xander
- Animators: Bill Hajee, Clarke Mallory, Jack Ozark, Virgil Raddatz, Morey Reden, Len Rogers, Don Schloat, Xenia DeMattia, Lou Zukor
- Animation checking: Renee Henning, Ann Oliphant, Jane Philippi
- Ink and paint manager: Martha Buckley
- Camera: Gene Gropper
- Film editor: Joseph Simon
- Sound supervisor: Jim Bullock
- Music composed and conducted by John Gart
- Music supervised by Gordon Zahler
- Assistant director: Anatole Kirsanoff
- Production coordinator: Joe Lynch
- Production assistant: Jack Boasberg
- Executive producer: Allen Ducovny
- Superman comics are published monthly by DC Comics
- A Filmation Associates Production In Association With Ducovny, Inc.
- Copyright(c) Filmation Associates, Inc., 1966-1970.

== Home media ==
In 1985, Warner Home Video released seven selected episodes of the series on VHS in the "Super Powers" video collection along with Aquaman, Batman, and Superboy. These videos were re-released in 1996.

On June 26, 2007, Warner Bros. Home Video (via DC Comics Entertainment and Warner Bros. Family Entertainment) released a two-disc DVD box set of The New Adventures of Superman featuring all 36 Superman segments from the first season, but none of The Adventures of Superboy segments, due to a legal battle between Warner Bros. Entertainment and the estate of Jerry Siegel over the rights to the Superboy name. Warner Bros. Home Entertainment released seasons 2 & 3 on DVD in Region 1 in June 2014, again omitting the Superboy segments. In 2018 Warner Bros. debuted a subscription video-on-demand service which included The New Adventures of Superman, but yet again, the Superboy segments were left out.

As of 2023, there has still been no home media release of the complete series. Streaming services have started incorporating the Superboy segments for seasons two and three, but not for season one, and the original intros and bumpers have also yet to be included in any home release.
