= The Adventures of Superboy (TV series) =

- Genre: Action; Superhero
- Based on: Superboy by: Jerry Siegel; Joe Shuster; Don Cameron
- Written by: Vernon E. Clark; Whitney Ellsworth
- Directed by: George Blair
- Starring: Bob Hastings; Janet Waldo; Ross Elliott; Ted Knight
- Country of origin: United States
- Original language: English
- No. of seasons: 3
- No. of episodes: 34

Production
- Running time: 6 minutes
- Production companies: Filmation; National Periodical Publications

Original release
- Network: CBS
- Release: September 10, 1966 – November 2, 1968

Related
- The New Adventures of Superman (TV series); The Superman/Aquaman Hour of Adventure; The Batman/Superman Hour

The Adventures of Superboy is a series of six-minute animated Superboy cartoons produced by Filmation that were broadcast on CBS between 1966 and 1969. The 34 segments appeared as part of three different programs during that time, packaged with similar shorts featuring The New Adventures of Superman and other DC Comics superheroes.

These adventures marked the animation debut of Superboy, as well as his teenage alter ego Clark Kent, Lana Lang, and Krypto the super-powered dog who would accompany his master on every dangerous mission. Other characters such as Jonathan and Martha Kent, foster parents of the Boy of Steel, and the town of Smallville were also faithfully recreated from comic book adventures. As a result of the production's budget, the show featured a great amount of stock animation as well as limited movement from the characters.

Each episode featured the Boy of Steel ducking out of high school and racing into action to battle a wide array of adversaries, from dognappers in "Krypto, K-9 Detective", androids run amok in "The Revolt of Robotville", and alien menaces in "The Spy from Outer Space", to another young hero with similar powers in "Superboy Meets Mighty Lad", and a slew of otherworldly monsters ("The Deep Sea Dragon", "The Visitor from the Earth's Core"). He winds up being captured and fighting a gang of small-time crooks—all while in his disguise as Clark Kent—in "The Gorilla Gang". Most of the stories were written by DC writers such as Bob Haney and George Kashdan, while character designs were based closely upon the Superboy comic books of the time.

== Home media ==
In 1985, Warner Home Video released eight selected episodes of the series on VHS in the "Super Powers" video collection along with Aquaman, Batman, and Superman. These videos were rereleased in 1996.

Although The New Adventures of Superman was released on DVD, the sets do not include the Superboy shorts because of a legal battle between Warner Bros. and the estate of Superboy's co-creator Jerry Siegel over the rights to the "Superboy" name that occurred at the time. Streaming services have included the Superboy shorts for seasons two and three, but not for season one, which as of 2023 has not yet been released for any home video format.

== Voice cast ==
- Bob Hastings as Kal-El/Clark Kent / Superboy
- Janet Waldo as Lana Lang
- Ted Knight as Narrator
- Jackson Beck as Introductory narrator

== Episodes ==
=== Season 1 (1966–67) ===
The series premiered on September 10, 1966 as part of a 30-minute program named The New Adventures of Superman, featuring two Superman shorts with one Superboy segment in between.

No. overall	No. in season	Title	Directed by	Written by	Original release date
1	1	"The Spy from Outer Space: Part 1"	Hal Sutherland, Anatole Kirsanoff	Mort Weisinger	September 10, 1966
Krypto encounters an alien spy who creates disasters on Earth as part of an invasion attempt.
2	2	"The Spy from Outer Space: Part 2"	Hal Sutherland, Anatole Kirsanoff	Mort Weisinger	September 17, 1966
Superboy must be rescued by Krypto when he follows the spy to his home planet and the system's red sun drains his powers.
3	3	"Krypto's Calamitous Capers"	Hal Sutherland, Anatole Kirsanoff	George Kashdan, Mort Weisinger	September 24, 1966
A criminal scientist has created a sonic beam transmitter with which he can cause Krypto to turn belligerent.
4	4	"The Man Who Knew Superboy's Secret"	Hal Sutherland, Anatole Kirsanoff	Oscar Bensol, Mort Weisinger	October 1, 1966
A man pretending to be from Krypton sets a trap for Superboy by promising to give him immunity to Kryptonite.
5	5	"The Deep Sea Dragon"	Hal Sutherland, Anatole Kirsanoff	Mort Weisinger	October 8, 1966
A dragon whose egg is mistakenly taken by deep sea divers becomes violent until Superboy sets things right—but the egg is later stolen by undersea pirates.
6	6	"The Super Clown of Smallville"	Hal Sutherland, Anatole Kirsanoff	Mort Weisinger	October 15, 1966
A sickly billionaire vows to give away his fortune to charity if he can be made to laugh.
7	7	"The Visitor from the Earth's Core"	Hal Sutherland, Anatole Kirsanoff	J.W. Doctor, Mort Weisinger	October 22, 1966
When Superboy drills to the Earth's core, he finds a glowing black sphere that draws out a crystalloid being.
8	8	"The Beast That Went Berzerk"	Hal Sutherland, Anatole Kirsanoff	Mort Weisinger	October 29, 1966
A scientist's growth serum makes a pygmy elephant into a giant beast; the scientist developed an antidote, but his bitterly jealous assistant sabotages the experiment.
9	9	"Superboy's Strangest Foe"	Hal Sutherland, Anatole Kirsanoff	Mort Weisinger	November 5, 1966
Two alien children cause havoc on Earth through their innocent play.
10	10	"The Capricious Crony"	Hal Sutherland, Anatole Kirsanoff	George Kashdan, Mort Weisinger	November 12, 1966
An undersea volcano releases an impish water being who causes havoc on solid ground.
11	11	"Krypto, Super Seeing-Eye Dog"	Hal Sutherland, Anatole Kirsanoff	Leo Dorfman, Mort Weisinger	November 19, 1966
When a Kryptonian space probe is found, it contains weapons, one of which accidentally blinds Superboy.
12	12	"The Black Knight"	Hal Sutherland, Anatole Kirsanoff	Oscar Bensol, Mort Weisinger	November 26, 1966
Clark Kent's young friend Timmy (Lou Scheimer) finds a magician's mantle that transports him back in time to the jousting fields of Camelot and King Arthur.
13	13	"Operation Counter Invasion"	Hal Sutherland, Anatole Kirsanoff	Mort Weisinger	December 3, 1966
Superboy must convince three alien warriors that Earth is populated by metahumans.
14	14	"The Jinxed Circus"	Hal Sutherland, Anatole Kirsanoff	George Kashdan, Mort Weisinger	December 10, 1966
Superboy must help a circus being sabotaged by the ringmaster's former partner.
15	15	"Hurricane Fighters"	Hal Sutherland, Anatole Kirsanoff	Mort Weisinger	December 17, 1966
Superboy must work to stop a violent hurricane.
16	16	"Superboy's Super-Dilemma"	Hal Sutherland, Anatole Kirsanoff	Leo Dorfman	December 24, 1966
A scientist tests a Kryptonite antidote on Superboy that does not work, but which he accidentally mixed with plant growth serum that causes big problems.
17	17	"A Devil of a Time" *	Hal Sutherland, Anatole Kirsanoff	Mort Weisinger	December 31, 1966
Spotting two criminals during a costume ball, Clark Kent decides to use his devil costume to masquerade as the real Mephistopheles.
18	18	"The Revolt of Robotville"	Hal Sutherland, Anatole Kirsanoff	George Kashdan, Mort Weisinger	January 7, 1967
Robotville is an experimental city controlled by machine beings, which suddenly go on a rampage at the programming of the city's evil main engineer.

Asterisk (*) indicates episodes that do not contain narration.

=== Season 2 (1967–68) ===
The Superman/Aquaman Hour of Adventure was first broadcast on September 9, 1967. This 60-minute program included new Superboy and Superman segments, and adventures featuring Aquaman and his sidekick Aqualad. It also comprised a rotating series of 'guest star' segments featuring the Atom, the Flash and Kid Flash, Green Lantern, Aquaman and the Teen Titans (Speedy, Kid Flash, Wonder Girl and Aqualad).

No. overall	No. in season	Title	Directed by	Written by	Original release date
19	1	"The Beast With Two Faces"	Hal Sutherland, Rudy Larriva, Amby Paliwoda, Don Towsley, Lou Zukor	Unknown	September 9, 1967
A saurian beast rampages through a Central American village before suddenly going docile, and the reason why is exploited by a gang of thieves.
20	2	"The Gorilla Gang"	Hal Sutherland, Rudy Larriva, Amby Paliwoda, Don Towsley, Lou Zukor	Unknown	September 16, 1967
During a school exploration of a canyon, Clark Kent and Lana Lang are captured by fugitive gangster "Ape" Hanson and his mob.
21	3	"The Chameleon Creature"	Hal Sutherland, Rudy Larriva, Amby Paliwoda, Don Towsley, Lou Zukor	George Kashdan	September 23, 1967
In the jungles of Africa, a mysterious mist transmutes an albino creature into any form.
22	4	"The Great Space Race"	Hal Sutherland, Rudy Larriva, Amby Paliwoda, Don Towsley, Lou Zukor	George Kashdan	September 30, 1967
Superboy must help a crew of interplanetary authorities (modeled after actor Barry Morse) pursue an evil scientist whose weaponry is causing disasters on Earth.
23	5	"Finger of Doom"	Hal Sutherland, Rudy Larriva, Amby Paliwoda, Don Towsley, Lou Zukor	George Kashdan	October 7, 1967
A scientist is irradiated by the energy of a rogue star, turning him into an evil being with super energy emanating from his hands.
24	6	"Krypto, K-9 Detective"	Hal Sutherland, Rudy Larriva, Amby Paliwoda, Don Towsley, Lou Zukor	Bob Haney	October 14, 1967
Dog thieves are on the rampage until Krypto, posing as an innocent dog, is captured.
25	7	"The Neanderthal Caveman Caper"	Hal Sutherland, Rudy Larriva, Amby Paliwoda, Don Towsley, Lou Zukor	Unknown	October 21, 1967
Four fugitives encounter an iceberg in which a caveman has been frozen in suspension and now is revived.
26	8	"The Terrible Trio" *	Hal Sutherland, Rudy Larriva, Amby Paliwoda, Don Towsley, Lou Zukor	Leo Dorfman	October 28, 1967
Three school bullies are taught a needed lesson from Superboy.

Asterisk (*) indicates episodes that do not contain narration.

=== Season 3 (1968–69) ===
The Batman/Superman Hour premiered on September 14, 1968, featuring Superboy and Superman shorts alongside the adventures of Batman, Robin and Batgirl.

No. overall	No. in season	Title	Directed by	Written by	Original release date
27	1	"Forget Me Not, Superdog"	Hal Sutherland, Rudy Larriva, Amby Paliwoda, Don Towsley, Lou Zukor	George Kashdan	September 14, 1968
Breaking up a meteor shower, Superboy and Krypto are struck by a Kryptonite meteor, which gives Krypto amnesia.
28	2	"Superboy Meets Mighty Lad"	Hal Sutherland, Rudy Larriva, Amby Paliwoda, Don Towsley, Lou Zukor	George Kashdan	September 21, 1968
An alien youth has created superpowers implanted in a blue costume and begins showing off on Earth.
29	3	"King Superboy"	Hal Sutherland, Rudy Larriva, Amby Paliwoda, Don Towsley, Lou Zukor	Unknown	September 28, 1968
After destroying a fireball that bombards Earth, Superboy is hailed as a king by an alien civilization whose populace is held hostage by the Chrystal people, the source of the fireball.
30	4	"Double Trouble, Double Doom"	Hal Sutherland, Rudy Larriva, Amby Paliwoda, Don Towsley, Lou Zukor	George Kashdan	October 5, 1968
Space authorities recruit Superboy to help them track down a gang of pirates.
31	5	"The Trap of the Super Spacemen"	Hal Sutherland, Rudy Larriva, Amby Paliwoda, Don Towsley, Lou Zukor	George Kashdan	October 12, 1968
Alien beings capture astronauts and drain their energy into their warriors, and proceed to do the same to Superboy.
32	6	"The Space Refugees"	Hal Sutherland, Rudy Larriva, Amby Paliwoda, Don Towsley, Lou Zukor	Unknown	October 19, 1968
Three vicious prospectors attack a pair of aliens who seek only sanctuary in a mountain countryside.
33	7	"The Monster Molecule"	Hal Sutherland, Rudy Larriva, Amby Paliwoda, Don Towsley, Lou Zukor	George Kashdan	October 26, 1968
A Universal Molecule is used in an experiment that goes wrong; a scientist is irradiated and Superboy must fly 1,000 years into the future, where the Molecule will have grown to large size.
34	8	"The Great Kryptonite Caper"	Hal Sutherland, Rudy Larriva, Amby Paliwoda, Don Towsley, Lou Zukor	George Kashdan	November 2, 1968
A gang hopes to use a Kryptonite amulet against Superboy, but in trying to lure him into their trap they accidentally detonate an underground oilfield—which causes them to lose the amulet, which is later found by Lana Lang.
