= Evil Star =

Evil Star is the name of two supervillains appearing in DC Comics publications.

== Publication history ==
The Guy Pompton version of Evil Star debuted in All Star Comics #44 (December 1948) and was created by John Broome and Irwin Hasen.

The alien version of Evil Star first appeared in Green Lantern (vol. 2) #37 (June 1965) and was created by Gardner Fox and Gil Kane.

== Fictional character biography ==
=== Guy Pompton ===
Guy Pompton
- The Golden Age Evil Star menaces Hollywood and the Justice Society of America; art by Irwin Hasen.

Publication information
- Publisher: DC Comics
- First appearance: All Star Comics #44 (December 1948)
- Created by: John Broome; Irwin Hasen

In-story information
- Species: Human

Guy Pompton is a crime lord and the owner of Ace Movie Rental Agency. He dons a costumed identity to stop a movie studio from completing a film using a script that will expose his criminal activities and battles the Justice Society of America before being defeated.

=== Unknown ===
Evil Star
- Evil Star in The Darkstars #4 (January 1993). Art by Travis Charest.

Publication information
- Publisher: DC Comics
- First appearance: Green Lantern (vol. 2) #37 (June 1965)
- Created by: Gardner Fox; Gil Kane

In-story information
- Species: Aoran
- Place of origin: Aoran
- Team affiliations: Suicide Squad
- Abilities: Genius-level intellect; Starband grants: Flight; Energy manipulation; Illusion casting; Psychokinesis; Self-sustenance; Advanced longevity

A scientist on the planet Aoran dedicates himself to cheating death by drawing power from the stars themselves. He invents the Starband, which makes him immortal, but twists his mind toward evil and prematurely ages his fellow Aorans. The people of Aoran want him to destroy the Starband, but having tasted immortality he refuses to give it up. The ensuing battle leaves all of Aoran lifeless except for the scientist, now known as Evil Star. Evil Star seeks new worlds to conquer and comes into frequent conflict with the Guardians of the Universe and the Green Lanterns, including Hal Jordan.

The Guardians send Evil Star to the Erral Rehab Facility, where they use a brainwave nullifier in an attempt to cure him. This rehabilitation is only partially successful, as the nullifier stimulates his subconscious mind and recreates the Starlings, who bring him the Starband. Evil Star flees to Earth in a confused state, believing the Starlings are persecuting him. He fights with Ferrin Colos, one of the Darkstars, who floods Evil Star's mind with reminders of the lives he has taken, starting with his homeworld. Evil Star's mind shuts down, and he is returned to the Guardians for re-education.

Evil Star appears in Grant Morrison and Liam Sharp's The Green Lantern. Slavers from Dhor free him from the Southern Supervoid where he was being incarcerated by the Guardians of the Universe. The slavers attack Evil Star and remove his Starbrand, which was preserving his youth. Without the Starbrand, Evil Star rapidly ages and dies. Evil Star is later revealed to have survived.

== Powers, abilities, and equipment ==
Evil Star's primary weapon is the Starband. The Starband draws the energy from various stars to prolong his lifespan, as well as granting him other powers. This enables him to fly at the speed of sound, survive in outer space, read or alter minds, project illusions, telekinetically manipulate objects (especially metals), generate force blasts, create hard-light constructs, and empowers the Starlings. The Starlings are smaller versions of Evil Star that possess superhuman physical abilities and their own replica devices. They need direct commands from their master to function or become defenseless without him via unconsciousness.

== Other versions ==
- An alternate universe version of Evil Star appears in Batman: In Darkest Knight. This version is Harvey Dent, who was scarred by Sinestro, empowered with Lantern energy, and became known as Binary Star.
- An alternate universe version of Evil Star appears in JLA: Another Nail.

== In other media ==
=== Television ===
- Evil Star appears in The Superman/Aquaman Hour of Adventure "Green Lantern" segment episode "Evil is as Evil Does", voiced by Paul Frees.
- Evil Star appears in Justice League Unlimited, voiced by an uncredited George Newbern. This version is a member of Gorilla Grodd's Secret Society.
- Evil Star appears in the Batman: The Brave and the Bold episode "Revenge of the Reach!", voiced by J. K. Simmons.

=== Video games ===
- Evil Star appears in DC Universe Online, voiced by Joey Hood.
- Evil Star appears as a character summon in Scribblenauts Unmasked: A DC Comics Adventure.

=== Miscellaneous ===
- Evil Star appears in a Justice League tie-in novel.
- Evil Star appears in the DC Super Heroes illustrated children's book Beware Our Power!, written by Scott Sonneborn and published by Capstone Publishers.
