= Bob Hastings =

American actor (1925–2014)

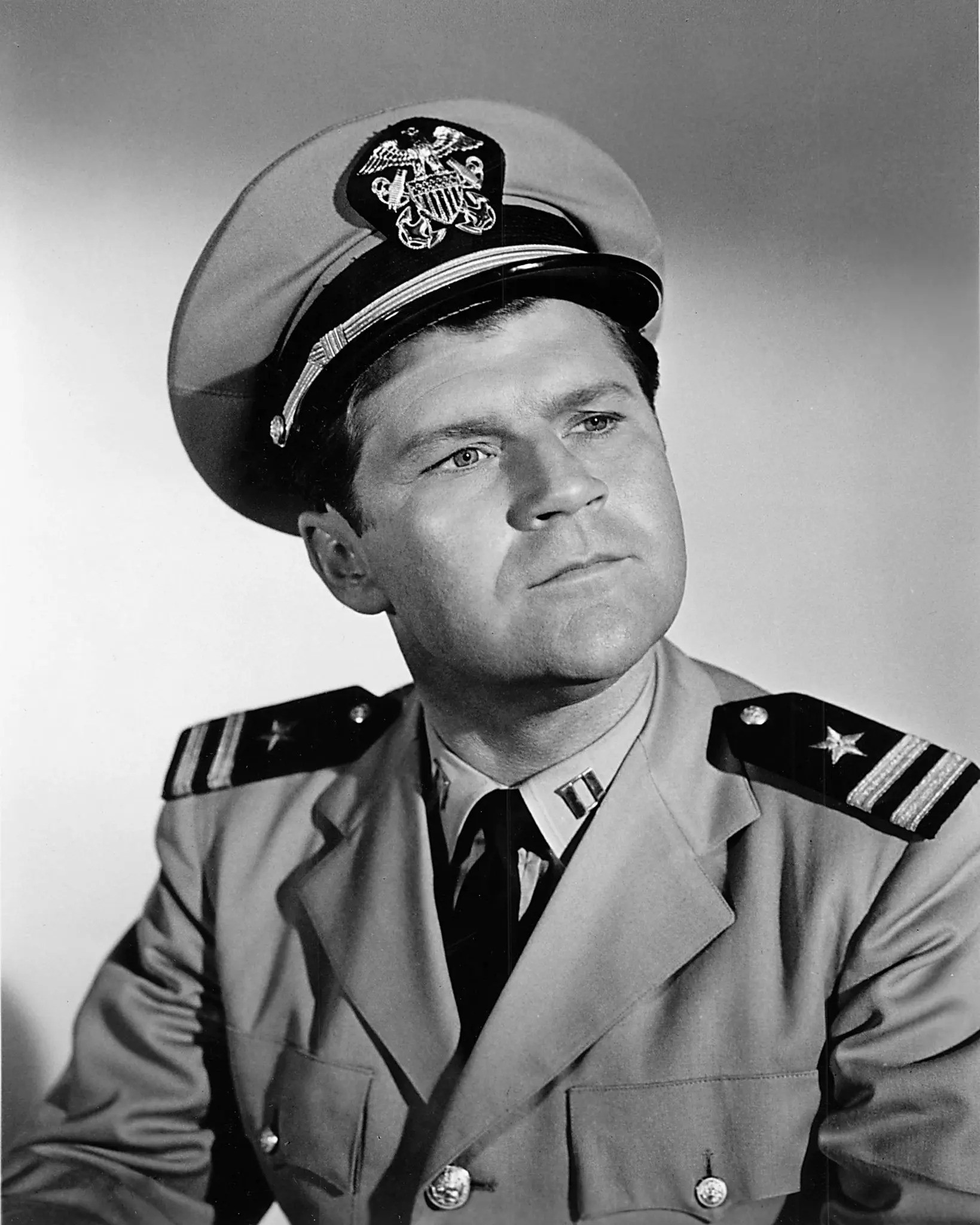
- Hastings as Lt. Carpenter in McHale's Navy (1964)
- Born: Robert Francis Hastings; April 18, 1925; Brooklyn, New York, U.S.
- Died: June 30, 2014 (aged 89); Burbank, California, U.S.
- Resting place: Forest Lawn Memorial Park, Hollywood Hills, California, U.S.
- Occupation: Actor
- Years active: 1936–2013
- Spouse: Joan Rice-Hastings (m. 1948)
- Children: 4
- Relatives: Don Hastings (brother)

Robert Francis Hastings (April 18, 1925 – June 30, 2014) was an American actor. He was best known for his portrayal of Lt. Elroy Carpenter on McHale's Navy and voicing Commissioner James Gordon in the DC Animated Universe.

== Early life ==
Hastings was born in Brooklyn, New York to Charles and Hazel Hastings. His father was a salesman. He started out as a boy singer on National Barn Dance, Doug Gray's Singing Gang and Coast to Coast on a Bus. He also portrayed Jerry on the radio program The Sea Hound.

== Career ==
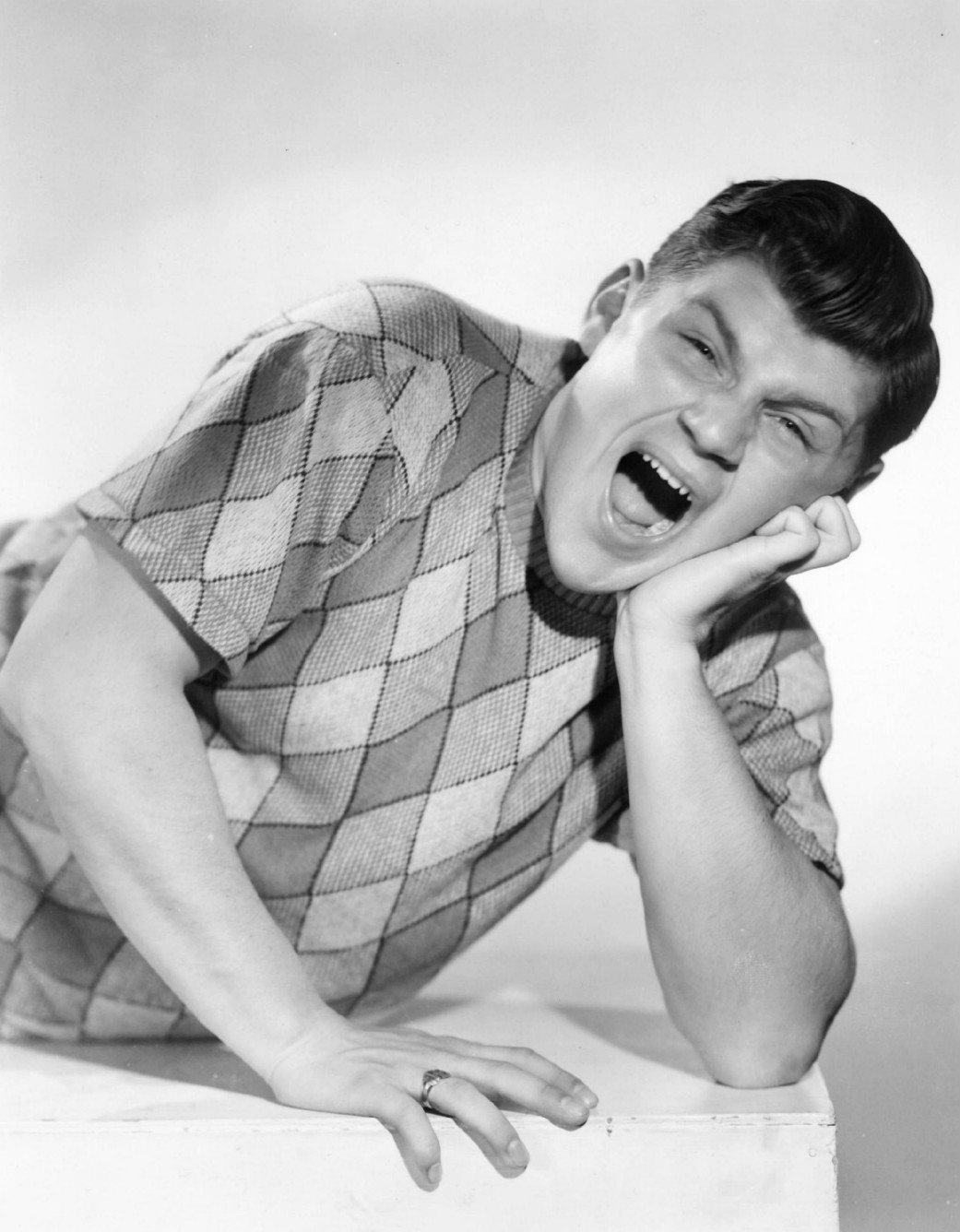
Hastings as Archie Andrews in a 1946 publicity photo

After Hastings returned from military service as a navigator on B-29 Stratofortresses, he played the role of Archie Andrews in a series based on the Archie comic book series on NBC Radio from 1945 to 1953.

Hastings moved to television in 1949, performing in early science-fiction series, including Atom Squad. In 1954, he was the featured pitch-man (acting as an amateur magician) for Bakers Instant Cocoa Mix television commercials. His first recurring role was as a lieutenant on Phil Silvers' Sergeant Bilko series in the late 1950s. At that time he also guest-starred in The Real McCoys episode "How to Paint a House". He also appeared in Captain Video playing the brother of "The Video Ranger", who was, in turn, played by Hastings' brother Don. Hastings portrayed Edward Foyle in the NBC drama Kitty Foyle (1958).

=== 1960s–1970s ===
Most of his career was spent in television, including five episodes of CBS's Green Acres beginning in the second season in such various roles as an Air Force officer, state trooper, telephone installer and finally in two sixth season episodes as a sheriff. Hastings was cast as Lt. Bolt in the 1960 episode "Space Man" of the CBS military sitcom/drama Hennesey, starring Jackie Cooper. Hastings guest-starred in the ABC/Warner Bros. sitcom Room for One More, starring Andrew Duggan and Peggy McCay, on the Robert Young CBS sitcom/drama Window on Main Street, as Russian pilot Igor Piotkin on Hogan's Heroes, and on the NBC police sitcom Car 54, Where Are You?. In 1962, he played a railroad executive in the episode "Substitute Sheriff" of the NBC Western series The Tall Man. He appeared five times on CBS's Dennis the Menace, most notably as Coach Gilmore in the 1963 episode "The Big Basketball Game". He appeared in three episodes of the sitcom Pete and Gladys.

Hastings portrayed the aide to Captain Binghamton (Joe Flynn), the yes-man Lieutenant Elroy Carpenter on ABC's McHale's Navy, humorously called "Carpy" and "Little Leadbottom" by McHale and his men. Hastings played Captain Ramsey on ABC's General Hospital. He hosted the game show Dealer's Choice and had a recurring role as bar owner Tommy Kelsey on All in the Family.

After McHale's Navy, Hastings was a regular on the Universal Studios lot, where Universal paid actors during downtime to be on the grounds and talk to tourists. He appeared in the 1968 Universal film Did You Hear the One About the Traveling Saleslady?, as well as The Bamboo Saucer (1968), Angel in My Pocket (1969), The Love God? (1969), and The Boatniks (1970). In 1971, Hastings was cast in the comedy film How to Frame a Figg, also starring Don Knotts, and also had roles in The Poseidon Adventure (1972), The All-American Boy (1973) and No Deposit, No Return, All in the Family (Kelsey)(1976). He appeared in Harper Valley PTA (1978) as Skeeter Duggan, a member of the PTA board who had been kidnapped at the orders of its dishonest president to commit election fraud.

=== Voice-over work ===
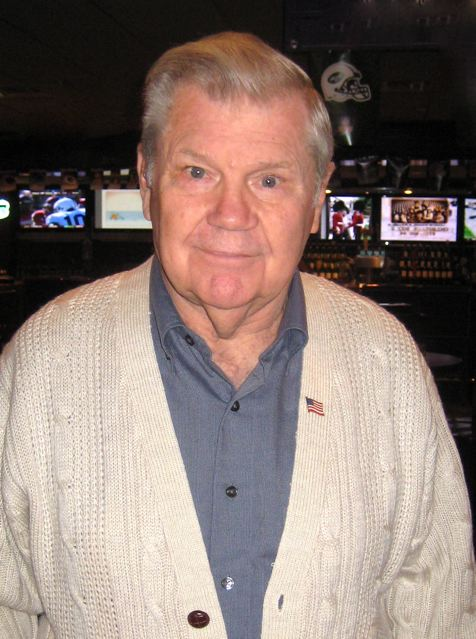
Hastings in 2008

Hastings also did voice work for animation and commercials, including Superboy in The New Adventures of Superboy cartoons of the 1960s, D.D. on Hanna-Barbera's Clue Club, and James Gordon in the DC Animated Universe, as well as several Batman video games. His earlier work in animation included voicing Henry Glopp on Hanna-Barbera's animated series Jeannie and Fred Flintstone and Friends as well as voicing characters on Challenge of the Superfriends.

== Personal life ==
The older brother of longtime As the World Turns star Don Hastings, Hastings married Joan Rice in 1948. They were married for 66 years and, at the time of his death, the couple had four children, 10 grandchildren, and 13 great-grandchildren.

== Death ==
Bob Hastings died on June 30, 2014, from prostate cancer at age 89. His funeral mass was held in Burbank, California's Saint Finbar Catholic Church.

== Filmography ==
=== Film ===
Year	Title	Role	Notes
1961	The Great Impostor	State Department Official	Uncredited
1962	Moon Pilot	Motorist	Uncredited
1968	Did You Hear the One About the Traveling Saleslady?	Lyle Chatterton	
1968	The Bamboo Saucer	Garson	
1969	Angel in My Pocket	Ted Palish	
1969	The Love God?	Shrader	
1970	The Boatniks	Chief Walsh	
1971	How to Frame a Figg	Chris Groat	
1971	The Marriage of a Young Stockbroker	Baseball Fan #2	
1971	The Strange Monster of Strawberry Cove	Deputy Tom Martin	
1972	The Poseidon Adventure	M.C.	
1973	Charley and the Angel	News Reporter	
1973	The All-American Boy	Ariel Van Daumee	
1974	Airport 1975	Freeman's Friend at Airport	Uncredited
1976	No Deposit, No Return	Peter	
1978	Harper Valley PTA	Skeeter	
1981	The Munsters' Revenge	Phantom of the Opera	
1981	Separate Ways	Jack	
1984	Snowballing	Carol Tolson	
1992	Shadow Force	Mayor Talbert	
1993	Batman: Mask of the Phantasm	Commissioner Gordon	Voice
1998	Batman & Mr. Freeze: SubZero	Commissioner Gordon	Voice, direct-to-video
2003	Batman: Mystery of the Batwoman	Commissioner Gordon	Voice, direct-to-video

=== Television ===
Year	Title	Role	Notes				
1961	The Tom Ewell Show	Hub Norton	Episode: "No Fun in the Sun"				
1961	Window on Main Street	Warren	Episode: "A Doctor Comes to Town"				
1961–1962	Gunsmoke	Bill Craig / Whip	Episodes: “The Squaw” /“Call Me Dodie”				
1963	Mister Ed	Secret Service Man	Episode: "Ed and the Secret Service"				
1963	The Twilight Zone	Sam	Episode: "I Dream of Genie"				
1963	The New Casper Cartoon Show	Various voices	26 episodes				
1964–1966	The Munsters	Charlie the Raven	Voice, 10 episodes; uncredited				
1964	McHale's Navy	Lt. Elroy Carpenter					
1965	McHale's Navy Joins the Air Force	Lt. Elroy Carpenter					
1966–1969	The Adventures of Superboy	Kal-El / Clark Kent / Superboy	Voice, 34 episodes				
1966	Superboy	Kal-El / Clark Kent / Superboy	Voice				
1966–1970	The New Adventures of Superman	Kal-El / Clark Kent / Superboy	Voice, 68 episodes				
1967	Batman	Major Beasley	Episode: "Penguin Sets a Trend"				
1967	Hogan's Heroes	Igor Piotkin	Episode: "A Russian Is Coming"				
1967–1968	The Superman/Aquaman Hour of Adventure	Young Clark Kent / Superboy	Voice, 36 episodes				
1968	Adam-12	Charles Beuhler	Season 1 Episode 3: "It's Just a Little Dent, Isn't It?"				
1968	Adam-12	Charles Beuhler	Season 1 Episode 13: "Christmas – The Yellow Dump Truck"				
1968–1969	The Batman/Superman Hour	Superboy / Young Clark Kent	Voice, 34 episodes				
1968	I Dream of Jeannie	Homer Banks	Episode: "Have You Heard the One About the Used Car Salesman?"				
1971–1976	All in the Family	Tommy Kelsey	12 episodes	1971	Adam-12	Bartender	Season 4 Episode 1: "Extortion"
1971	Green Acres	Sheriff	1 episode				
1972	The ABC Saturday Superstar Movie	Bull / Captain Shad	Voice, episode: "Gidget Makes the Wrong Connection (a.k.a. The Odd Squad)"				
1972	Room 222	Bud Nagle	Episode: "Just Call Me Mr. Shigematsu"				
1973	Jeannie	Henry Glopp	Voice, 16 episodes				
1973	The New Scooby-Doo Movies	Henry Glopp / Additional voices	Voice, 7 episodes				
1973	Adam-12	Ed Mason	Episode: "West Valley Division"				
1974	Devlin	Additional voices	16 episodes				
1975	The Great Grape Ape Show	Additional voices	16 episodes				
1976	Insight	Johnny Mitchell	Episode: "All Out"				
1976	Clue Club	D.D.	16 episodes				
1977	Spider-Man	Monahan	Television film				
1977	CB Bears	Loudmouse	Voice, 13 episodes				
1977–1979	Wonder Woman	Gatekeeper / George	2 episodes				
1977–1978	The Skatebirds	D.D.	16 episodes				
1977–1978	The Robonic Stooges	D.D.					
1977–1978	Fred Flintstone and Friends	Henry Glopp	Voice, 95 episodes				
1977	The All-New Super Friends Hour	Corky / Scott / Additional voices	2 episodes				
1978	Buford and the Galloping Ghost	Additional voices	13 episodes				
1978	Yogi's Space Race	Additional voices	13 episodes				
1978	Challenge of the Superfriends	Pied Piper / Space Genius / Additional voices	Voice, episode: "The Pied Piper From Space"				
1978–1979	The Galloping Ghost	Additional voices	13 episodes				
1978–1979	The Buford Files	Additional voices	13 episodes				
1978–1979	Galaxy Goof-Ups	Additional voices	13 episodes				
1978–1986	General Hospital	Captain Burt Ramsey	26 episodes				
1979	Casper and the Angels	Additional voices	13 episodes				
1979–1980	Scooby-Doo and Scrappy-Doo	Additional voices	16 episodes				
1979–1980	The New Shmoo	Additional voices	16 episodes				
1979	The Incredible Hulk	Earl	Episode: "My Favorite Magician"				
1979	Three's Company	John Callan	Episode: "The Love Barge"				
1980	The Waltons	Carl	Episode: "The Last Straw"				
1980	Captain Caveman and the Teen Angels	Additional voices	Episode: "Cavey and the Volcanic Villain"				
1980–1982	Super Friends	Additional voices	22 episodes				
1982	Jokebook	Additional voices	3 episodes				
1992–1994	Batman: The Animated Series	Commissioner James Gordon	Voice, 50 episodes				
1997–1998	Superman: The Animated Series	Commissioner James Gordon	Voice, 2 episodes				
1997–1999	The New Batman Adventures	Commissioner James Gordon	Voice, 8 episodes				
2002	Gotham Girls	Commissioner James Gordon	Voice, 4 episodes; web series				
2003	Static Shock	Commissioner James Gordon	Voice, episode: "Hard as Nails"				

=== Video games ===
Year	Title	Role	Notes
1994	The Adventures of Batman & Robin	Commissioner Gordon	Voice
2001	Batman: Vengeance	Commissioner Gordon	Voice
2001	Jak and Daxter: The Precursor Legacy	Mayor Manac	Voice
2003	Batman: Rise of Sin Tzu	Commissioner Gordon	Voice
2010	Mafia II	The Judge	Voice
