= Jack Grimes (actor) =

American actor (1926–2009)

- Publicity photo of Jack Grimes
- Born: April 1, 1926; New York City, U.S.
- Died: March 10, 2009 (aged 82); New York City, U.S.
- Occupation: Actor
- Years active: 1933–1991

Jack Grimes (April 1, 1926 – March 10, 2009) was an American voice and radio actor who played Jimmy Olsen in the last three years of The Adventures of Superman radio program, and the 1966 Filmation TV series The New Adventures of Superman. He is also known for his performance as the mechanic Sparky, and the pet chimp Chim-Chim in the 1967 anime Speed Racer.

== Early years ==
Grimes was born April 1, 1926, in New York City. His acting career began at age seven during the Great Depression, when he helped earn money for his family. He completed grammar school at the Professional Children's School and went on to complete four years at Columbia University.

== Career ==
=== Stage ===
Grimes appeared as Jackie Grimes in the Broadway play The Old Maid, which won a Pulitzer Prize and ran for 10 months in New York. It then went on tour for another 11 months. His other Broadway credits include Stork Mad (1936), Excursion (1937), and Western Waters (1937–1938).

=== Radio ===
Grimes worked on radio, beginning with the CBS program Let's Pretend. By age 12, he was appearing on 35 to 40 radio shows a week. He was also a regular on The Fred Allen Show, The Philip Morris Playhouse, Second Husband, CBS Radio Mystery Theater, and Death Valley Days. Grimes notably appeared as the titular robot in the 05/13/1950 episode of Dimension X, entitled "Almost Human".

=== Film and television ===
In 1944, Jack Grimes moved to California to work for Universal and Metro-Goldwyn-Mayer. His screen credits include River Gang (in a comedy role written for Huntz Hall), Lady on a Train, and Week-End at the Waldorf. In the early 1950s, Grimes switched to television. His credits include Alcoa Presents, Love of Life, The Aldrich Family, Tom Corbett, Space Cadet, Maude, On the Rocks, and All in the Family.

In 1962, Grimes and Peter Fernandez worked together on a series of records for MGM. Five years later, Fernandez hired him to do the voices of Sparky and Chim Chim on Speed Racer.

== Death ==
Grimes died in Queens, New York City, in 2009 at age 82.

== Filmography ==
- River Gang (1945) – Goofy
- Lady on a Train (1945, uncredited)
- Week-End at the Waldorf (1945, uncredited)
- Speed Racer (1967) – Chim-Chim / Sparky (voice)
- Pendulum (1969) – Artie
- The Wonderful World of Puss 'n Boots (1969) – Pierre (voice)
- Cold Turkey (1971) – TV Stage Manager
- Jack and the Beanstalk (1974) – Crosby (English version, voice, uncredited)
- Enchanted Journey (1981) – (voice)
