= Ted Knight =

American actor (1923–1986)

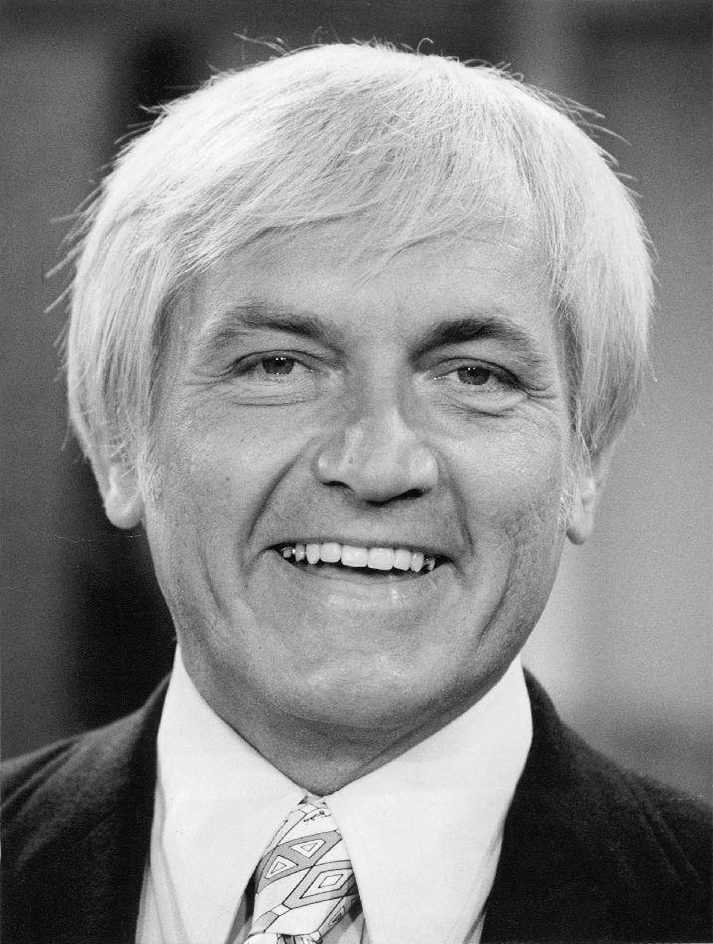
- Knight in 1972
- Born: Tadeusz Wladyslaw Konopka; December 7, 1923; Terryville, Connecticut, U.S.
- Died: August 26, 1986 (aged 62); Los Angeles, California, U.S.
- Resting place: Forest Lawn Memorial Park, Glendale, California, U.S.
- Occupation: Actor
- Years active: 1950–1986
- Spouse: Dorothy Smith Knight (m. 1948)
- Children: 3
- Awards: Hollywood Walk of Fame

Ted Knight (born Tadeusz Wladyslaw Konopka; December 7, 1923 – August 26, 1986) was an American actor known for playing the comic roles of Ted Baxter in The Mary Tyler Moore Show, Henry Rush in Too Close for Comfort, and Judge Elihu Smails in Caddyshack.

== Early life ==
Knight was born in the Terryville section of Plymouth in Litchfield County, Connecticut, to Polish-American parents Sophia (née Kavaleski) and Charles Walter Konopka, a bartender. He withdrew from high school to enlist in the United States Army during World War II and was a member of Company A, 296th Combat Engineer Battalion, earning five campaign stars while serving in the European Theater of Operations.

== Career ==
=== Early roles ===
During the postwar years, Knight studied acting in Hartford, Connecticut. He became proficient with puppets and ventriloquism, which led to steady work as a television children's show host at WJAR-TV in Providence, Rhode Island from 1950 to 1955. In 1955, he left Providence for Albany, New York, where he landed a job at station WROW-TV (now WTEN), hosting The Early Show, featuring MGM movies, and a children's variety show, playing a Gabby Hayes-type character named "Windy Knight". He was also a radio announcer for sister station WROW radio and briefly for WFNS in Burlington, North Carolina. He left the station in 1957 after being turned down for a raise and receiving advice from station manager (and future Capital Cities chairman) Thomas Murphy that he should take his talents to Hollywood.

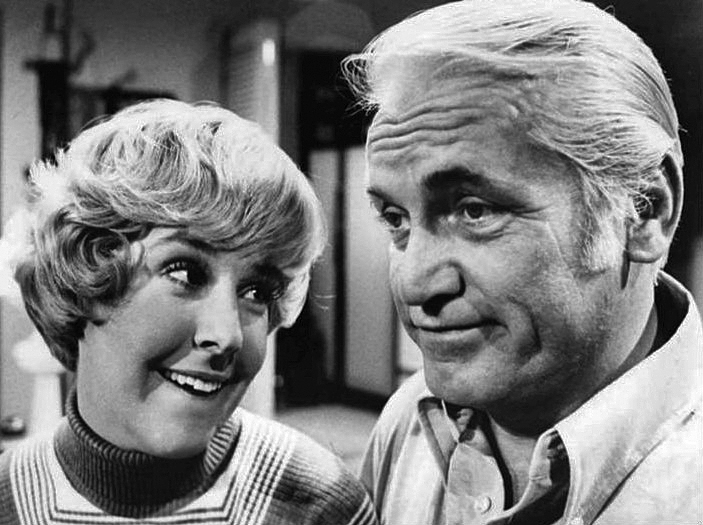
Ted Knight and Georgia Engel on The Mary Tyler Moore Show

Knight spent most of the 1950s and 1960s creating commercial voiceovers and playing minor television and film roles. In 1959 he played a part in the western TV show Lawman in the episode “The Ugly Man”. He had a small part playing a police officer guarding the room where Norman Bates sat wrapped in a blanket at the end of Alfred Hitchcock's Psycho (1960). He played Phil Buckley on the ABC soap opera The Young Marrieds in the early 1960s.

=== The Mary Tyler Moore Show ===
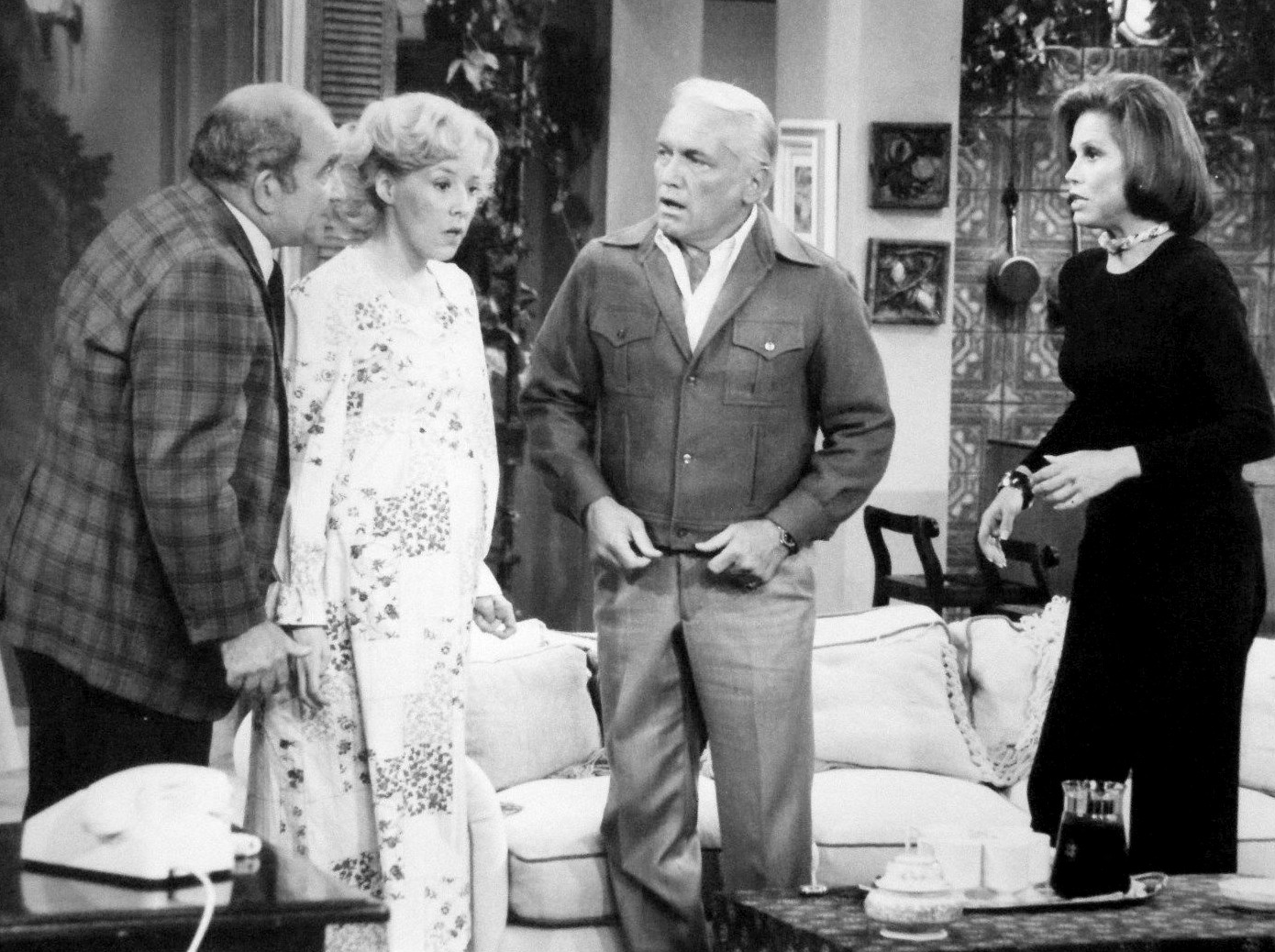
From L-R: Ed Asner, Georgia Engel, Ted Knight and Mary Tyler Moore from The Mary Tyler Moore Show (1976)

Knight's role as the vain and untalented WJM newscaster Ted Baxter on The Mary Tyler Moore Show brought widespread recognition and his greatest success. He received six Emmy Award nominations for the role, winning the Emmy for Outstanding Performance by an Actor in a Supporting Role in Comedy in 1973 and 1976.

=== Post-MTM appearances ===
In 1975, Knight recorded an album of mostly novelty songs, Hi Guys, on the Ranwood label.

Knight guest-starred in "Mr. Dennis Steps Out", the October 26, 1977, episode of the situation comedy Busting Loose, as Roger Dennis, the owner of an escort service in New York City. This appearance launched a new show, The Ted Knight Show, Knight's first starring role. The Ted Knight Show lasted for only six episodes in the spring of 1978.

Knight appeared in several episodes of The Love Boat, including one episode as a rival cruise captain.

Knight's final film role was in the 1980 golf comedy Caddyshack, in which he played Judge Elihu Smails, a foil for Rodney Dangerfield's character.

=== Too Close for Comfort ===
Knight was cast in the lead role as the curmudgeonly cartoonist Henry Rush in the series Too Close for Comfort in 1980.

== Personal life ==
In 1948, Knight married Dorothy Smith and the couple had three children: Ted Jr., Elyse and Eric.

In January 1985, Knight was awarded a star on the Hollywood Walk of Fame for his contributions to the television industry. It is located at 6673 Hollywood Boulevard.

== Death ==
A few months after the end of the Mary Tyler Moore Show in 1977, Knight was diagnosed with colon cancer, for which he received treatment. In 1985, the cancer returned and spread to his bladder and gastrointestinal tract.

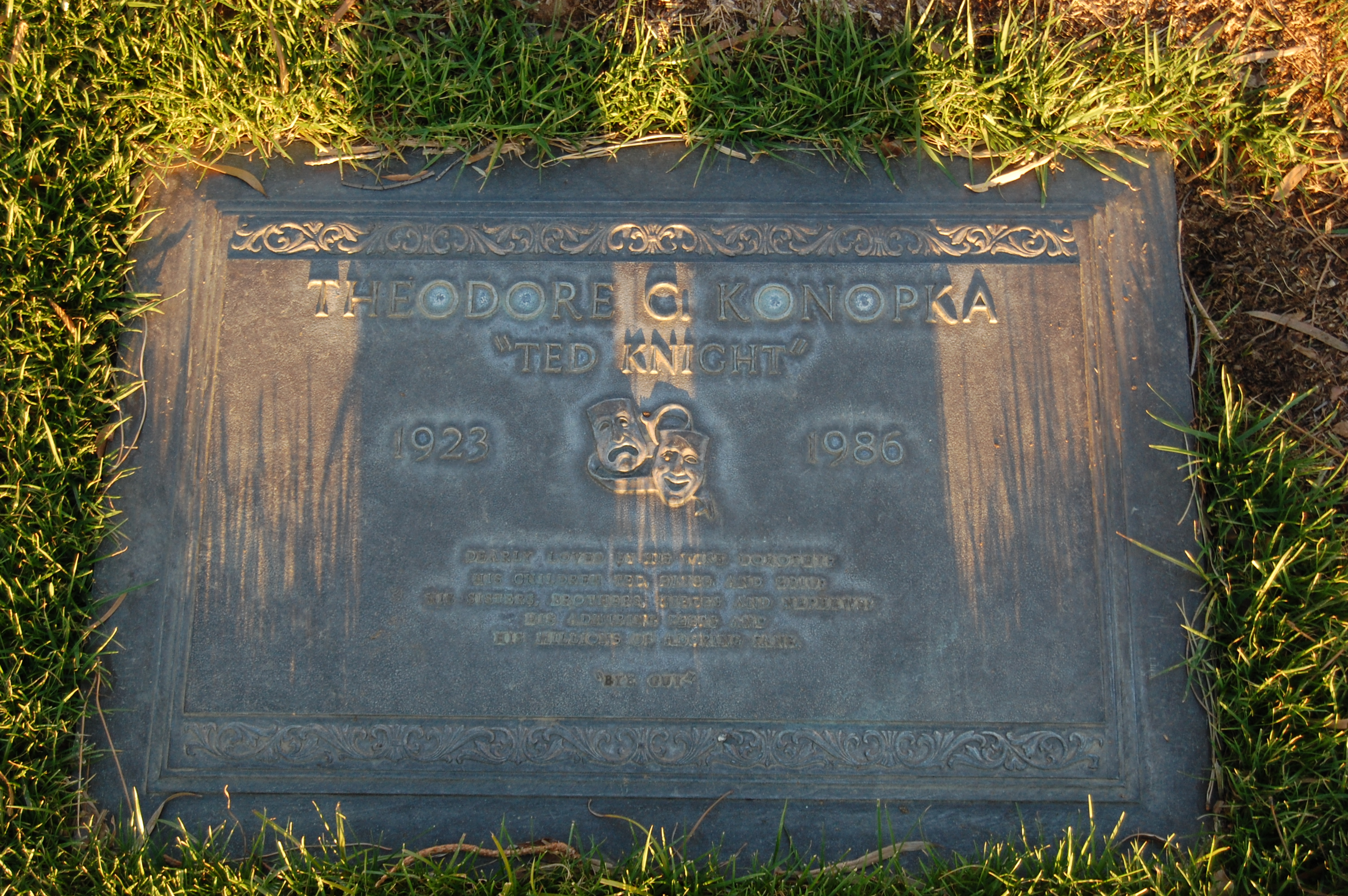
Ted Knight's grave

Knight experienced complications from the surgery and was advised to not resume work on Too Close for Comfort until he recovered. His condition worsened and he died on August 26, 1986, at age 62.

Knight is interred at the Forest Lawn Memorial Park in Glendale, California. His grave marker bears the name Theodore C. Konopka and the words "Bye Guy", a reference to his Ted Baxter catchphrase "Hi, guys!"

His hometown of Terryville, Connecticut, dedicated a bridge on Canal Street over the Pequabuck River in his memory. There is a bronze plaque bearing his likeness on the bridge.

== Filmography ==
Television
Year	Title	Role	Notes
1959	Highway Patrol	Merrill Hartman	1 episode: "Exposé"
1959–1965	Gunsmoke	Jay Rabb, Bill Miller	2 episodes
1959	The Twilight Zone	Adams	1 episode: "The Lonely”; uncredited
1960	One Step Beyond	Woodruff	1 episode: "Tidalwave"
1960	Alfred Hitchcock Presents	Mr. Maynard	1 episode: "Party Line"
1961	Sea Hunt	Steve Powery	1 episode: "The Defector
1961–1966	Bonanza	Halloran, Mayor Amos Garrett	2 episodes
1962–1966	Combat!	German Captain, Kurt, German Sergeant, Lt. Herlmoch	4 episodes
1964	The Outer Limits	Mr. Jerome	1 episode: "The Invisible Enemy"
1966–1967	Get Smart	KAOS Agent #1, Hans Frome	2 episodes
1966–1970	The New Adventures of Superman	Narrator, Perry White	Voice, 68 episodes
1966–1968	The Adventures of Superboy	Narrator, Jonathan Kent	Voice, 34 episodes
1967–1968	The Superman/Aquaman Adventure Hour	Narrator, Imp, Tusky, Black Manta, Torpedo Man, Blue Bolt	Voice, 36 episodes
1967	Journey to the Center of the Earth	Professor Oliver Lindenbrook, Count Saknussemm, Atlantian King	Voice, 17 episodes
1968	The Wild Wild West	Daniel	1 episode: "The Night of the Kraken"
1968–1969	The Adventures of Batman	Commissioner Gordon, The Penguin, The Riddler, Mr. Freeze, The Scarecrow, Doll-Man, Simon the Pieman, The Mad Hatter, Tweedledee and Tweedledum, The Judge, Narrator	Voice, 17 episodes
1968–1969	Fantastic Voyage	Commander Jonathan Kidd, Professor Carter	Voice, 17 episodes
1970–1977	The Mary Tyler Moore Show	Ted Baxter	165 episodes
1972	The New Scooby-Doo Movies	Ghost of Paul Revere, The Penguin, Troll	Voice, 16 episodes
1972–1973	Lassie's Rescue Rangers	Ben Turner, Aaron Lipton, Red Arrow	Voice, 16 episodes
1973	Inch High, Private Eye	Various	Voice, 13 episodes
1973	Super Friends	Narrator, The Flash, Anthro, Captain, Kolbar, Mr. Singh	Voice, 16 episodes
1973	Star Trek: The Animated Series	Carter Winston/Vendorian	Voice, 1 episode: "The Survivor"
1978	The Ted Knight Show	Roger Dennis	6 episodes
1979	Saturday Night Live	Himself, Host	1 episode: "Ted Knight/Desmond Child & Rouge"
1980–1983	The Love Boat	Barney Gordon, Captain Gunner Nordquist, Tom McMann	8 episodes
1980–1985	Too Close for Comfort	Henry Rush	129 episodes
1985–1987	Too Close for Comfort	Henry Rush	22 episodes as The Ted Knight Show

Film
Year	Title	Role	Notes
1960	Man on a String	Professor Vasheen	Uncredited
1960	13 Fighting Men	Samuel	
1960	Twelve Hours to Kill	Police Sergeant Denton	
1960	Psycho	Policeman in Hallway Opening Door	Uncredited
1960	Cage of Evil	Lieutenant Dan Ivers	Uncredited
1960	Key Witness	Cowboy's Lawyer	Uncredited
1961	Swingin' Along	Priest	
1961	Cry for Happy	Lieutenant Glick	
1961	The Great Impostor	Reporter	Uncredited
1962	13 West Street	Baldwin	
1962	Hitler	Major Buch	
1962	The Pigeon That Took Rome	Steve	Uncredited
1962	The Interns	Photographer's Assistant at Fashion Shoot	Uncredited
1964	Nightmare in Chicago	Dan McVeay	
1964	The Candidate	Frank Carlton	
1965	Young Dillinger	Johnsyn	
1965	Blindfold	Dr. Bob Berford	Uncredited
1967	Countdown	Walter Larson	
1970	M*A*S*H	Offstage Dialog	Voice, uncredited
1971	Cold Turkey	Mr. Slick	Uncredited
1975	Emilio and His Magical Bull		Voice
1980	Caddyshack	Judge Elihu Smails	
