= Kids TV =

Defunct New Zealand television production company

Kids TV was a Dunedin-based television production company specialised in the creation of television series aimed at children. It produced TV3's earliest kids blocks, The Early Bird Show and 3PM, and was best known for its educational series You and Me, which was presented by Suzy Cato for a seven-year run. Some of its productions were also made for export, making it to countries such as the United Kingdom and Singapore. In addition, it also produced more mature programming, such as Straight Up, a talk show aimed at teenagers catering key issues, and a variety of documentaries.

Kids TV also ran a channel on the New Zealand television provider Saturn, which ran until October 2001. For this end, it set up an office in Wellington, where the company had its services, and was in charge of producing programmes. The closure of the channel led to the closure of the company.

== History ==
The origins of Kids TV lie in former What Now producer Rex Simpson's arrival to TV3, New Zealand's first private television network, as head of children's programming, where he produced The Early Bird Show for TV3. It aired from 7 to 9am from 27 November 1989, its first full day of operations. In February 1990, TV3 ditched weekday morning programming, causing it to be limited to weekends, remaining on air until 1993.

Facing the closure of TV3's production departments, favouring independent production companies to do programmes for the network, Simpson created Kids TV in 1991, headquartered in Dunedin with offices in Auckland. In 1992, a crew from the company traveled to New Orleans to produce a documentary on Moana and the Moa Hunters' trip there to a local festival.

At the end of 1992, ten of the company's staff were laid off when TV3 axed five local productions, among them The Early Bird Show, which they made for the network. In June 1993, Ian Kingsford-Smith, who defected from the network, set up an international division, Kids TV International.

You and Me started airing on TV3 on 6 July 1992. In 1993, Suzy Cato took over presenting duties. In March 1994, Kids TV started producing a pilot programme made specifically for the British market, produced for The Children's Channel. It was also holding talks with American network PBS for a "quasi-educational" series. In May, it made an Oprah-style talk show for TV3, Straight Up, consisting of three editions. Catered at a teen and young adult audience, it tackled topics such as alcoholism and the state of the education system. In October, it received NZ On Air funding for new episodes of You and Me and two further specials of Straight Up.

In September 1997, the company received an injection of NZ$1,122,160 for 194 new episodes of You and Me and six documentaries to air on TV3. The company also released new shows such as The Shelly T. Turtle Show and the stop motion series Bobbie the Bus, but these were mostly seen abroad, as both TVNZ and TV3 rejected the show, which co-owner Simon Henderson had no idea on the decision, which was suggested by the broadcasters themselves as not willing to look for children's programming. After operating for a decade in Dunedin, the company moved to Wellington in February 2001. When the cable channel closed in October 2001, it lost four staff: two presenters (Suzy Cato had already left the company), a sound technician and a producer. Rex Simpson decided to take the issue to court. On 7 November 2001, the company auctioned off its property, including props and puppets from You and Me, its flagship series.

== Channel ==
Kids TV
- Country: New Zealand
- Broadcast area: Part-national

Ownership
- Owner: Kids TV Ltd.

History
- Launched: 1996
- Closed: October 2001

Links
- Website: web.archive.org/web/20010515192431/http://www.kidstv.co.nz/ (2001)

Kids TV started operating a dedicated channel in 1996 when cable television started in New Zealand, sharing the same name as the company. The plan was first mooted in 1995 by receiving an application with Telecom for a pilot cable service in Auckland By March 1996, during the trial period of the cable service, it was already successful with children.

In October 2001, what was later known TelstraSaturn shut down the channel owing to commercial decisions.

=== Programming (under what's on) ===
The channel aired a large amount of foreign series, as well as its own productions.

- The Adventures of Blinky Bill
- Alex (1987 French series)
- Barney
- Bertha
- Bip and Bop
- Bobbie the Bus (Local)
- Bump
- The Busy World of Richard Scarry
- The Caribou Kitchen
- Charlie Chalk
- Christopher Crocodile
- Delfy and His Friends
- Dino Babies
- Dog Tracer
- Dr. Zitbag's Transylvania Pet Shop
- Emma and Grandpa
- Fifi's Crafty Arts
- Family Ness
- Felix the Cat
- Galaxy High School
- Ghostbusters
- Gran
- Grimmy
- Hello Kitty
- Jimbo and the Jet Set
- Little Witches
- Lizzie's Library
- Morph
- Nellie the Elephant
- Ocean Girl
- Paddington Bear
- PC4U
- Philbert Frog
- Portland Bill
- The Raccoons
- Robinson Sucroe
- Sanrio World of Animation
- The Shelly T. Turtle Show (Local)
- The Shoe People
- Sing Something Simple (Local)
- The Slow Norris
- Smoggies
- Spider!
- Spirou and Fantasio
- Tales of the Tooth Fairies
- Tiny Tales
- The Trap Door
- Urmel
- The Very Hungry Caterpillar
- What-a-Mess
- The Wombles
- You and Me (Local)

== Productions ==
=== Children's series ===
- The Early Bird Show (1991-1992)
- You and Me (1992-1999)
- Bobbie the Bus (1999; rejected by TVNZ and TV3 but screened abroad, in the UK, Australia and the Netherlands)
- The Shelly T. Turtle Show (rejected by TVNZ and TV3)
- Sing Something Simple (199?)

=== Documentaries ===
- Entertainment Storytelling (1993)
- The News Story (1993), on a TVNZ news crew

=== Miscellaneous ===
- Straight Up! (children's talk show, 1994-1995)
