= The Early Bird Show =

Television series

The Early Bird Show is an Australian children's television show that aired on Network Ten in Australia from 26 January 1985 until 10 June 1989. The show was so popular that a magazine about it was published in 1989.

== Format ==
Produced by Dixie Duncan and directed by Spencer Wilson, Ray McKenna and Bob Loxton, the Early Bird Show was hosted by Australian rock singer Darryl Cotton Marie Van Maaren and Marty The Monster. The Early Bird Show, an extremely popular family and children's variety show, was a live, five-hour production on air from 7am - 12pm every Saturday. The show included many popular regulars including, Roy Hampson (Good Morning Melbourne co-Host with Annette Allison) as the 'professor' Liane Scurrah-Jonas VFL/AFL injury prevention fitness trainer, Author, breakfast announcer & talkback radio, Pilates and Aerobics trainer) 'fun & fitness', Ken Hayden (a local butcher) and his daughter Kate Hayden cooked in-studio egg & bacon sandwiches and pancake breakfasts for the cast and crew, Frits Maaten (Animal nature park owner) and his animals, Rosemary (Dance School owner and teacher) and her EBS dancers, Colin Beaumont, (entertainer & Musician) remote control car segment, Brad McLeod (The Computer Man), puppets Mr and Mrs Timms. Many big names in music, TV, radio and sport appeared regularly to take a part of the fun and games. In 1989, the show was shortened to two hours and renamed Club 10. This version lasted ten weeks before being replaced with Video Hits, a music video show.

== Other versions ==
An earlier version of the show had aired from 1977 until 1980. Shown on weekday mornings, The Early Bird Show featured hosts Mike McCarthy and Marie Van Maaren. The show was replaced in 1981 by the long-running Good Morning Australia (breakfast TV). A similar, but unrelated, show named Early Birds was broadcast by SAS10 in Adelaide in the early 1970s. The show was hosted by Veronica Overton and Fat Cat. "Early Birds" was a mix of cartoons, competitions and music clips. Overton had been a singer and actress. During one telecast, Overton resigned on camera, saying "Goodbye children. Fat Cat will be back on Monday, but I won't". Occasional stand-in, DiDi James, took over the show for a short while and later Jane Reilly became host.

TVW 7 Perth (TVW Enterprises owned TVW 7 Perth and SAS 10 Adelaide in the 70s) also had a very popular Earlybirds show in the 1970s and 1980s from 7 to 9 am. It featured Fat Cat and another character Percy Penguin, plus puppets, Wilbur Worm, who had a sarcastic streak, in the early days, and Sunny Sandgroper, who always told appalling jokes. There were two hosts, one male and one female, and those who appeared over the years on the Perth version were Keith Geary, Ian Teasdale, Sandy Baker (née Palmer), Carolyn Noble, Sharon Dale, Peter Dean, Ann Sanders and others. It was made at TVW Tuart Hill Studios and often presented outdoor broadcasts at shopping centres and other establishments. It ran mainly during each school holiday initially and then each weekday toward the end, when networking pushed it out of the schedules in favour of Agro's Cartoon Connection and ultimately new shows. TVW did a Saturday version of Earlybirds, calling it Fat Cat's Funtime Show. It ran throughout the late 1970s and 80s years until Saturday Disney brought about its demise.

In New Zealand, TV3 have also alternated and created their very own version of the show which went from 1989 to 1992. It originally aired on weekday mornings from 7:00am to 9:00am before shifting to weekend mornings (same timeslot). Also known as EBS, it was presented by Suzy Cato and a puppet character named Russell Rooster along with another puppet character, Aunty Kiri Kea and her family of Rubber Ducks. This version of the show contains a few different segments which include local skits, competitions, games, interviews, jokes with Kiri and the Rubber Ducks, how to draw cartoon monsters with Mark, cooking with Annabel Langbein, Hollywood gossip with David Hartnell and also a variety of cartoons from overseas such as The Super Mario Brothers Super Show, The Charlie Brown and Snoopy Show, It's Punky Brewster!, Adventures of the Gummi Bears, Beetlejuice, Teenage Mutant Ninja Turtles, Garfield and Friends, He-Man and the Masters of the Universe, The Adventures of Raggedy Ann and Andy, Kissyfur, Super Friends, Dinosaucers, Mighty Mouse and Friends, Camp Candy, Dennis the Menace, Voltron: Defender of the Universe, Superman, Walt Disney's Mickey and Donald, Grimm's Fairy Tale Classics, The Real Ghostbusters (as well as its spin-off Slimer! And the Real Ghostbusters), The Wuzzles, Sylvanian Families, Pinocchio: The Series and DuckTales as well as some live-action programmes including the New Zealand children's educational series Aunties' Alphabet, the U.S. comedy television series Get Smart and the U.S. blooper special series Life's Most Embarrassing Moments. Cato later went on to host other television programmes such as Suzy's World, 3pm and You and Me. She then later ran a company called Treehut Productions which produces shows dedicating to share "Blue Light" safety messages.
