= List of Ghostbusters episodes =

List of Ghostbusters episodes may refer to:

- List of The Ghost Busters episodes, aired 1975
- List of Filmation's Ghostbusters episodes, aired 1986
- List of The Real Ghostbusters episodes, aired 1986–1991
