= Fraidy Cat (TV series) =

1975 American children's comedy cartoon

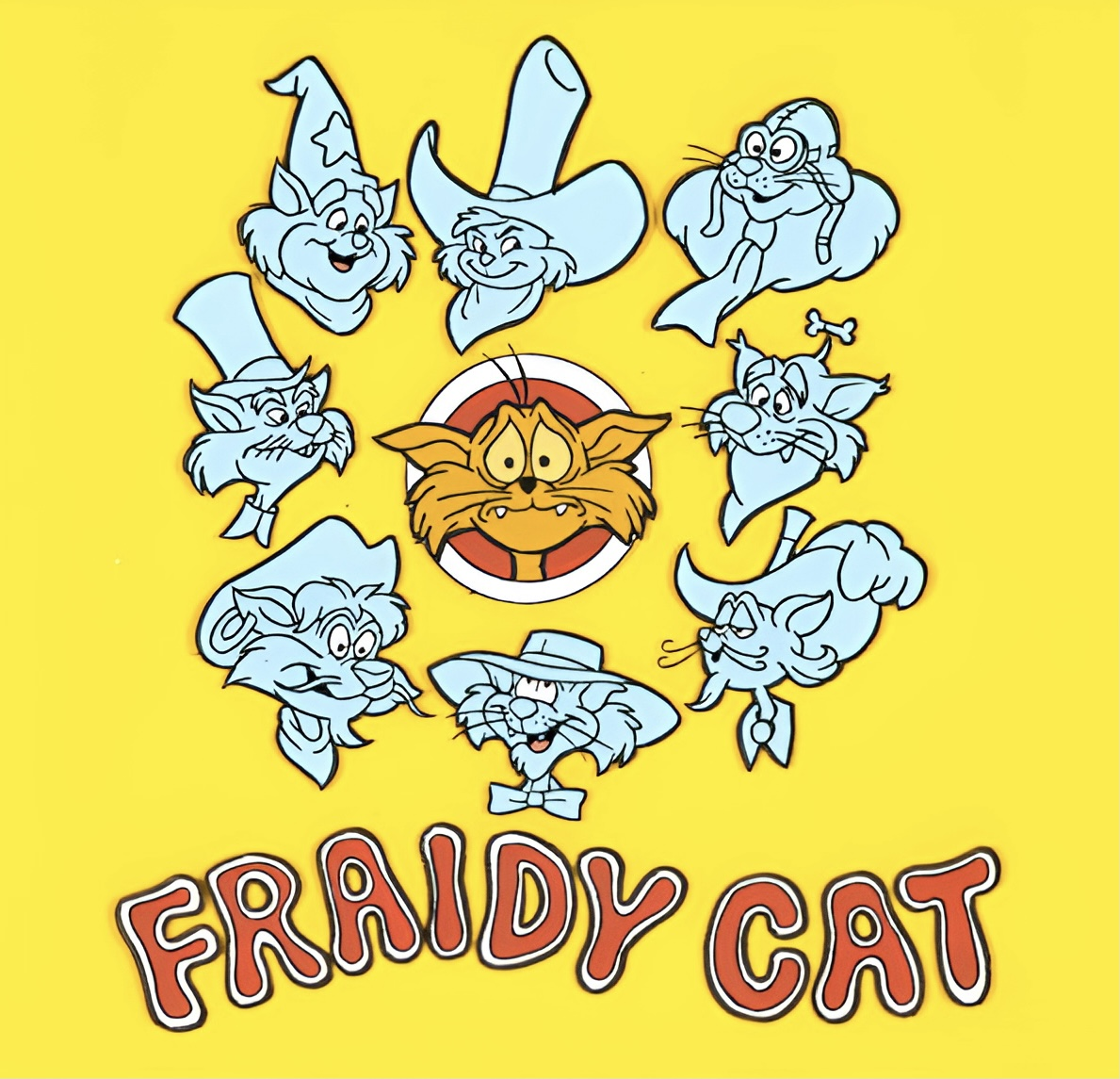
- Genre: Comedy
- Written by: Michael J. O'Connor
- Directed by: Don Towsley
- Voices of: Allan Melvin; Alan Oppenheimer; Jay Scheimer (uncredited); Lennie Weinrib
- Country of origin: United States
- Original language: English
- No. of episodes: 12 (+ 6 unproduced)

Production
- Producer: Lou Scheimer
- Running time: 6 minutes
- Production company: Filmation

Original release
- Network: ABC
- Release: September 6 – November 22, 1975

Fraidy Cat is a 1975 American children's comedy cartoon show that originally appeared as a segment on Filmation's short-lived ABC series Uncle Croc's Block. 18 episodes were commissioned and planned for inclusion on Uncle Croc's Block; 12 were ultimately made. The remaining six were scrapped due to the show getting removed from Uncle Croc's Block when the latter was shortened to a half-hour. Episodes would be aired in short 6-7 minute story formats.

The premise revolves around a paranoid alley cat who is haunted by his eight past lives, all from different time periods. He tries to avoid saying any single-digit number (excluding zero), as doing so will cause one of the corresponding ghosts to appear and make the situation he is in worse. The ghosts depicted include a saber-toothed tiger with a caveman motif and a pet Brontosaurus, a befuddled wizard, a pirate who self-identifies as a buccaneer and habitually steals anything of value, a foppish nobleman and swordsman from the Elizabethan era, a cowboy from the Western frontier, a undertaker who keeps trying to expedite the main character's passing to the afterlife, a fighter pilot from World War I, and an unusually intelligent zoot-suited jive-talking street cat with a beatnik accent who serves as the intellectual of the group.

The show aired in the United States on ABC, Canal+ in France, Junior in Germany, TV2 in Portugal, Super Écran in French-speaking regions of Canada, and RTÉ2 in Ireland. It has also been translated into Spanish, French, Norwegian, and German.

== Background ==
The show stars Fraidy Cat (voiced by Alan Oppenheimer, imitating Don Knotts), an unlucky, stuttering, miserable cat who, like all cats, has nine lives, but has used up eight of them and is on his ninth and last life, which he wants to make last the longest.

The show is centered around the fact that as if Fraidy's life was not miserable enough, nearly every time Fraidy inadvertently says out loud any single-digit number (from one to eight), or any word/homonym that correlates to said number, a ghost representing one of his previous lives will appear from the Other Side and mistakenly tend to make things even worse for the hopeless cat.

In each episode, Fraidy gets himself into a predicament caused by his desire for sleep or food, or something else, such as a dog, or another aggressor. This can include ending up into a sketchy town, a junkyard, or a bird shop, and usually has the character inhabiting said area to interact with or harm Fraidy in some sort of action against him (although this format is broken in several episodes). Fraidy always ends up saying a number "one" through "eight" out of pure accident, and each ghost cat corresponding to that number tries to help Fraidy in the situation. Saying "nine" however, summons Cloud Nine, an evil storm cloud whose purpose is to electrocute Fraidy.

The spirits in the series include:

1. Elafunt (voiced by Allan Melvin) is an overweight prehistoric saber-toothed tiger with a caveman motif. He owns a huge pet Brontosaurus named "Ant" (voiced by Allan Melvin). Fraidy often uses Ant as a hiding place in his times of need.
2. Kitty Wizard (voiced by Lennie Weinrib) is a befuddled wizard whose magic wand is often on the wrong setting. He is the most problematic of the ghosts, with his goofing up causing Fraidy more hindering than help.
3. Captain Kitt (voiced by Lennie Weinrib) is a pirate who is the self-proclaimed "buccaneer's buccaneer". Anything he sees that has value to it or is important he steals, such as keys, and money (which he calls "green-printed parchment").
4. Sir Walter Cat (voiced by Lennie Weinrib) is a foppish Elizabethan nobleman who is also an expert swordsman. He tends to look out for Fraidy the most and is the most loyal of the spirits.
5. Billy the Kit (voiced by Lennie Weinrib) is a western cowboy with a very loud voice who carries a very problematic lasso. His name is a play on Billy the Kid.
6. Jasper Catdaver (voiced by Alan Oppenheimer) is an undertaker who is Fraidy's cousin and prefers to expedite his passing to the Other Side, though not out of spite. Ironically, despite his nature as an undertaker, Jasper is the least troublesome of the ghosts.
7. Captain Eddie Kittenbacker (voiced by Alan Oppenheimer) is a pilot who is a very erratic flier, usually resulting in his plane flying upside-down or sideways. His name is a play on Eddie Rickenbacker, a WWI fighter ace.
8. Hep Cat (voiced by Allan Melvin) is a zoot-suited jive-talking street cat with a beatnik accent. He seems to be the smartest of the lives, often providing actual assistance to Fraidy.
9. Whilst accidentally uttering any of the aforementioned numbers gives Fraidy a ghost, saying the number nine materializes Cloud Nine (voiced by Alan Oppenheimer), a malevolent anthropomorphic deific number nine made from a storm cloud. Cloud Nine is always seen trying to electrocute him with his lightning bolts and he can regenerate if he mistakenly electrocutes himself.

== Episodes ==
The twelve existing episodes listed were made before the cancellation of Uncle Croc's Block. The episodes listed after "A Semi-Star is Born" were in production and eventually scrapped after Uncle Croc's Block was shortened to a half-hour, but excerpts of synopses for two of the scrapped episodes, "Fraidy Gone Fishin'" and "Double Trouble", have turned up in online eBay listings containing storyboards for said episodes.

No.	Title	Written by	Original release date	Prod. code
1	"The Not so Nice Mice"	Mike O' Connor	September 6, 1975	33001
After getting chased by a dog, Fraidy Cat stumbles into "Mouse Town", which is gang-owned territory owned by a gang of small but tough mice and their boss. After they endlessly trick Fraidy into saying many different numbers, he escapes from their clutches via Eddie Kittenbacker’s warplane. In a twist ending, he is unaware that he just stumbled into "Dog Town".
2	"Cupid and the Cat"	Mike O' Connor	September 13, 1975	33002
After saving an alluring female cat named Lulu (voiced by an uncredited Jay Scheimer) from a dog, Fraidy falls in love with her thanks to Danny Cupid's tricks. However, a bulky cat named Chuck is also in love with Lulu, and then he and Fraidy fight over who gets Lulu first, but Fraidy's "showing off" drives Lulu away from him, and ultimately, she sticks to Chuck instead.
3	"Over the Wall & Havin' a Ball"	Alan Dinehart	September 20, 1975	33003
Fraidy gets caught by animal control and is taken to the animal shelter, where he is recruited by two dog gangsters and their leader the "Grandfather" (a play on the Godfather) in a break-out operation so the Grandfather can see his favorite cartoon.
4	"Feline Fortune"	Mike O' Conner	September 27, 1975	33004
Fraidy needs to pay his phone bill in two days and in a stroke of luck, he finds a purse full of stolen money, returns it and gets $10,000 in reward money. Promptly, a group of burglars dubbed "The Cat Burglars" chase Fraidy and his newfound wealth until they turn themselves in after they encounter a scare with Captain Kitt. When Kitty Wizard accidentally shrinks the money, the episode ends with Fraidy asking the operator if she takes "small bills".
5	"Puss 'n' Boats"	David Wise & Kathleen Barnes	October 4, 1975	33005
After finding what seems to be the perfect spot for a nap, Fraidy wakes up to find that he is inside the hull of a cargo ship and to his dismay the crew, who are a flock of pirate gulls, parrots, and pelicans, threaten to throw him overboard unless if he works for them.
6	"A Scaredy Fraidy"	Haskell Barkin	October 11, 1975	33006
In a search for food, a starving Fraidy eats oat-flavored lollipops, but then rejects the confectionaries. Conveniently, Kojacki the police horse catches Fraidy, tags him as a "lollipop burglar", and chases him into a pet cemetery. After Fraidy plays dead, Kojacki feels sorrowful, and when it turns out that Fraidy isn't actually dead, the police horse makes amends with Fraidy by giving him the lollipops.
7	"Meaner Than a Junkyard Cat"	Alan Dinehart	October 18, 1975	33007
Tired, Fraidy accidentally lands in a junkyard after a fence post gives way, and in order not to get killed, he is hired by a junkyard dog named "Mr. Meaney" to stand guard while he tries to sleep after he accidentally summons Sir Walter Cat. Fraidy however, has a hard time trying to stay awake, and after Kitty Wizard is called forth, the perplexed magician causes Fraidy to fly over into a cargo trainyard.
8	"Love Is a Many Feathered Thing"	Lorna Smith	October 25, 1975	33011
Fraidy is caught between a big dog and three huge female birds in an exotic bird shop who are smitten for him. After many failed escape attempts, and some insufficient help from Billy the Kit and Kitty Wizard, Fraidy locks the dog in the cage with said birds, with the oversized birds switching their affections over to the defeated canine.
9	"It's a Dog's Life"	Chuck Menville	November 1, 1975	33012
The alluring scent of food lures Fraidy into a dog show cafeteria, and at the worst possible moment, the contestants; four cultured dogs, walk in on Fraidy chowing down on their lunch. This instigates a high-speed chase to ensue between Fraidy and the dogs, which in turn causes Fraidy to get splattered with black and white paint, causing him to be painted like a Dalmatian. Miraculously, Fraidy wins first prize, which instigates the contestants' jealousy.
10	"Choo-Choo Fraidy"	David Wise & Kathleen Barnes	November 8, 1975	33015
After stowing away on a freight train, Fraidy winds up in the desert. Thirsty, he encounters different animals, including Ruth Buzzard (with a voice modeled after Ruth Buzzi), who knows Jasper Catdaver; Smiley Coyote (a parody of Wile E. Coyote with a voice modeled after Harvey Korman), J. Edgar Cougar (with a voice modeled after Colonel Sanders), a prairie dog (with a voice modeled after a high-pitched Don Rickles), and a cultured circus lion.
11	"Magic Numbers"	Mike O' Conner	November 15, 1975	33016
After Fraidy gets mercilessly teased by the alleyway bullies Fatty Catty and Long Tail, they trick him into saying the dreaded "nine". Almost instantaneously, Cloud Nine sics himself onto Fraidy. Fraidy tries all his might to defend himself against the cloud, such as a mirror, Ant's tail, and even a phone booth, in which the latter ultimately works in the end.
12	"A Semi-Star Is Born"	David Wise & Kathleen Barnes	November 22, 1975	33018
With the help of retired animal actor Mister Fred (a parody of Mister Ed), Freddy disguises himself as famous star Boris the Cat (a parody of Morris the Cat) in an attempt to get food. He meets several stars such as Gentle Babs (a parody of Gentle Ben), Laughie (a parody of Lassie), Lawrence the Lop-Sided Lion (a parody of Clarence the Cross-Eyed One), and Cling Clong (a parody of King Kong). But the real Boris enters the retirement home, which causes all of the residents to chase Fraidy and Boris around, confusing one for the other. Note: The Pink Panther is also referenced with a phony panther being thrown out of the Animal Actors Retirement Home.
13	"Fraidy Gone Fishin'"	N/A	Unproduced	
Fraidy goes fishing at a lake in search for a meal. Due to being unproduced, information on this episode is scarce.
14	"Fraidy Come Home"	N/A	Unproduced	
15	"Double Trouble"	N/A	Unproduced	
Fraidy has to take care of two twin kittens after they fall out of a truck. Due to being unproduced, information on this episode is scarce. Note: Kitty Wizard was due to have an appearance in this episode.
16	"Unlucky Fraidy"	N/A	Unproduced	
17	"This Cat for Hire"	N/A	Unproduced	
Note: A slightly altered version of this episode's title, "The Cat for Hire", is commonly incorrectly used for the episode "Puss 'n' Boats". Alternatively, it is also sometimes mistakenly titled "This Cat for Hire", this episode's exact title.
18	"Culture Schlock"	N/A	Unproduced	

== Production ==
Fraidy Cat is one of the few original series (outside of an adaptation) to be produced by Filmation. Among the three cartoon segments released on Uncle Croc's Block, Fraidy Cat had the longest continued existence, with the Frightfully Funny Collection Volume 2 DVD set being the last release to officially contain all of the episodes, released in 2008 by BCI.

The series was supposed to conclude in 1976, with six more episodes commissioned by the network left to produce. ABC's Uncle Croc's Block was shortened to a half-hour time slot and, consequently, ultimately cancelled. Two of the segments, Fraidy Cat and Wacky and Packy, were cut from the shortened episodes, and only episodes of M-U-S-H were shown from then on (an ironic decision given that M-U-S-H was intentionally written to be the least entertaining of the shorts, which ABC did not appreciate). The remaining six episodes never made it past the writing and storyboard stage, as Filmation chose to pocket the money (which ABC had already paid) rather than finish production. There is still debate as to whether the show has twelve or eighteen episodes.

After Uncle Croc's Block ceased production and was cancelled, Fraidy Cat was later syndicated as part of the 1977 Groovie Goolies and Friends series, along with the other segments such as Wacky and Packy and M-U-S-H, alongside numerous other Filmation properties.

== Home media ==
In 1985, Fraidy Cat saw an officially licensed video release by The Video Collection in the United Kingdom. After the show was released on VHS in the US, numerous low-end tapes of the show surfaced in the American video market, many without the proper licensing information seen on authorized tapes.

Title	Release date	Additional information
The Video Collection: Fraidy Cat	November 3, 1986	Episodes: Feline Fortune, Puss 'n' Boats, A Scaredy Fraidy, Meaner Than a Junkyard Cat, Cupid and the Cat, Over the Wall & Havin' a Ball, Choo-Choo Fraidy, Magic Numbers, A Semi-Star Is Born

All of the produced Fraidy Cat episodes were released by UK-based Boulevard Entertainment on two DVD volumes in the 2000s and later by BCI on a compilation DVD called Frightfully Funny Volume Two, which also included episodes of Groovie Goolies and Filmation's Ghostbusters. These DVD releases brought Fraidy Cat back into the public eye after decades of scarce home media releases, and as of its release, the latter is the only release of Fraidy Cat in the American media market to contain the full 12-episode collection.

Title	Release date	Additional information
The Frightfully Funny Collection: Volume 2	October 21, 2008	Episodes: The Not so Nice Mice, Cupid and the Cat, Over the Wall & Havin' a Ball, Feline Fortune, Puss 'n' Boats, A Scaredy Fraidy, Meaner Than a Junkyard Cat, Love Is a Many Feathered Thing, It's a Dog's Life, Choo-Choo Fraidy, Magic Numbers, A Semi-Star Is Born

In the late 2000s, rumors spread of a DVD entitled "Cat Pack", containing both Fraidy Cat and The Secret Lives of Waldo Kitty. The DVD went unreleased since the company releasing the DVD, BCI, ceased operations.

== Status of copyright ==
Contrary to popular belief, Fraidy Cat is not in the public domain. Instead, an unknown buyer, who had bought aged prints of the show, had erroneously claimed that the show was in the public domain. Fraidy Cat ended up being released on several DVDs without Filmation's sanction. In spite of this, Fraidy Cat became the first Filmation property to be released on DVD, officially or not.

Several unofficial DVDs of the show incorrectly attribute the name of one of the unproduced episodes, "This Cat for Hire", to the fifth episode, "Puss 'n' Boats". This error has still not been corrected to this day.

Hallmark had owned the rights to the show, which were then passed onto Sony. Now, the show resides under the copyright of NBCUniversal in their DreamWorks Classics division, who are said to currently own the Filmation catalogue. Fraidy Cat is currently streaming on Tubi unofficially, but the show has yet to properly resurface on streaming services and home video.
