= Alan Oppenheimer =

American retired actor (born 1930)

- Oppenheimer in 1979
- Born: April 23, 1930 (age 96); New York City, U.S.
- Occupation: Actor
- Years active: 1956–2023
- Spouse(s): Marianna Elliott (m. 1958; div. 19??; m. 1992; died 2003)
- Children: 3

Alan Oppenheimer (born April 23, 1930) is an American retired actor. He has performed numerous roles on live-action television since the 1960s and has had an active career doing voice work since the 1970s.

== Early life ==
Oppenheimer was born in New York City on April 23, 1930, to Louis and Irene Oppenheimer. His father was a stockbroker.

== Career ==
=== Character roles ===
As a character actor, Oppenheimer has had diverse roles in popular American television programming, from playing a Nazi and a Hollywood movie star on Hogan's Heroes, to playing an Israeli secret agent as well as a double-agent KAOS scientist on Get Smart, to being the second actor to play Dr. Rudy Wells in The Six Million Dollar Man (Martin Balsam played the role in the pilot film). Oppenheimer took over as Rudy starting with the second pilot film, Wine, Women and War, up until the introduction of The Bionic Woman in 1975, whereupon Martin E. Brooks took over as Wells up until cancellation. He was the original Mickey Malph (Ralph Malph's dad) on Happy Days. He played a recurring role during the first two seasons of St. Elsewhere as Helen Rosenthal's husband, Ira. He had a recurring role as Mayor Alvin B. Tutwiller on Mama's Family.

Oppenheimer has appeared in science fiction in the 1973 cult classic Westworld, where he played the head IT technician. He has also appeared in three Star Trek series, always playing a different character. He appeared in the Star Trek: The Next Generation episode "Rightful Heir" as a Klingon cleric, Koroth, a primary instigator of the cloning of Kahless; on Deep Space Nine as Starfleet Captain Declan Keogh in command of the USS Odyssey; and as an alien ambassador in Voyager.

Oppenheimer also appeared as film director Cecil B. DeMille in the 1994 Broadway production of Andrew Lloyd Webber's Sunset Blvd.

=== Voice acting ===
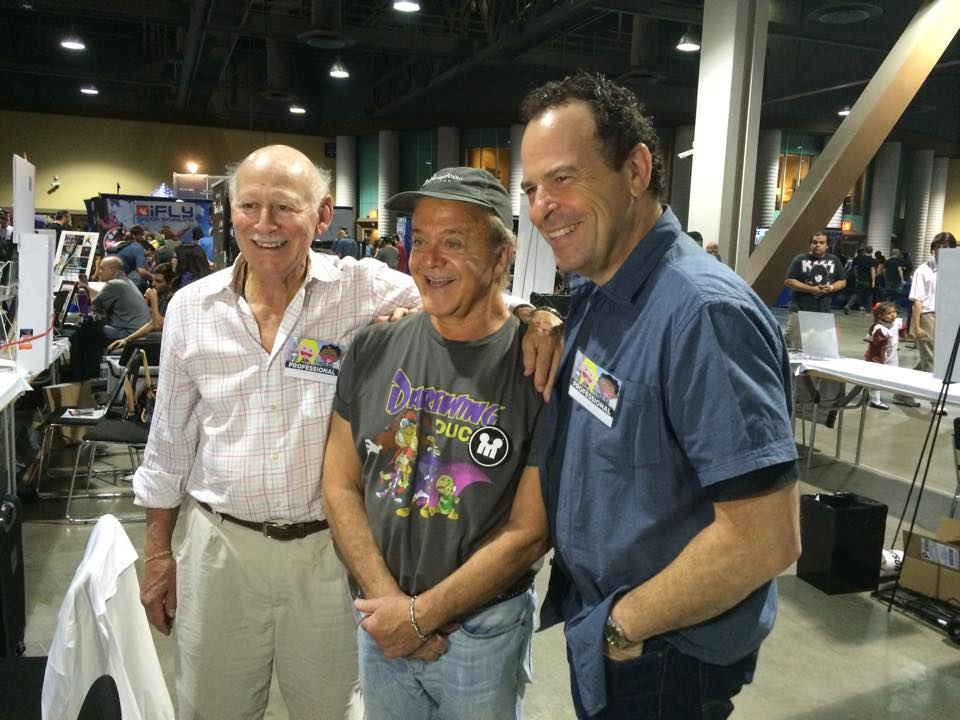
Oppenheimer (left) with Jim Cummings (middle) and Loren Lester (right) in 2015

Oppenheimer has voiced many characters, often for Filmation in the 1970s and 1980s, such as Fraidy Cat, Jasper Catdaver, Captain Eddie Kittenbacker and Cloud Nine on Uncle Croc's Block's Fraidy Cat; Mighty Mouse, Oil Can Harry, Swifty and the narrator on The New Adventures of Mighty Mouse and Heckle & Jeckle; Ming the Merciless on Flash Gordon; the Overlord on BlackStar; Skeletor, Man-At-Arms and Mer-Man from Filmation's 1980s cartoon He-Man and the Masters of the Universe; and the voice of Prime Evil in the 1986 TV series, Filmation's Ghostbusters. Other notable voice roles include Thundarr the Barbarian, Vanity on The Smurfs, Rhinokey and Crock from The Wuzzles and Falkor, Gmork, Rockbiter, and the Narrator from 1984's The NeverEnding Story. In the early 1990s, Oppenheimer was the voice of Merlin in The Legend of Prince Valiant. He also provided the voice of Barkerville in the Pound Puppies TV special, and provided additional voices on Battle of the Planets in 1978.

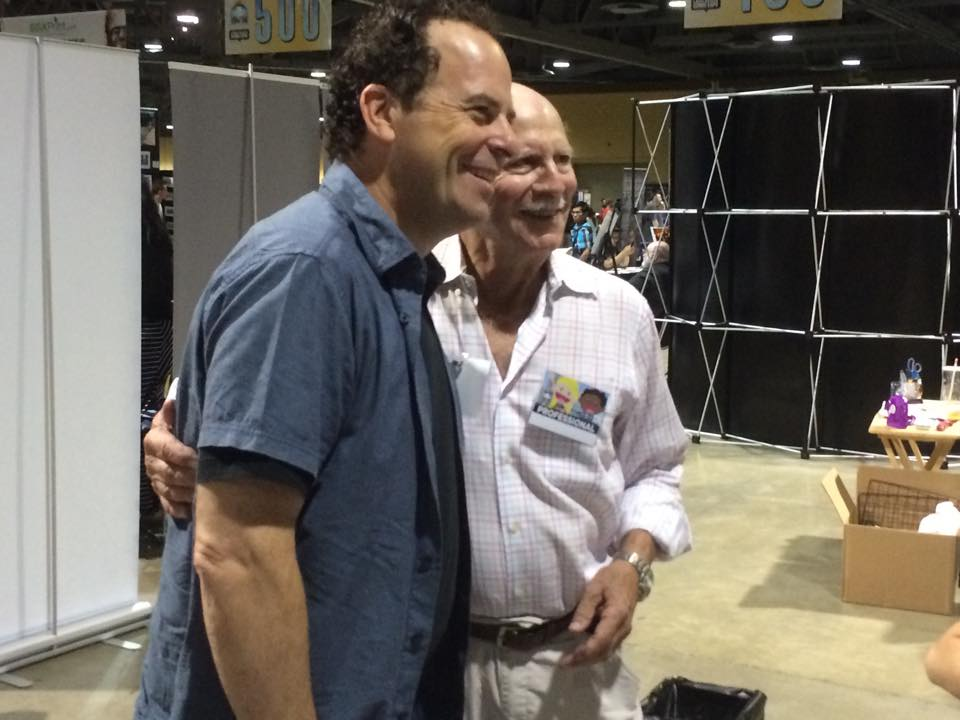
Oppenheimer and Loren Lester posing for a 2015 photograph

Oppenheimer worked on The Transformers, most notably as two contrasting characters, the pacifist Beachcomber and the bellicose Warpath. His rendition of Seaspray was remarkably similar to Mer-Man, including the gurgling effects. He took over the voice of Roger Smith's butler Norman Burg in the English dub of the second season of The Big O. He was the voice of the never-seen Alistair Crane on the soap opera Passions until 2004, when the character was finally shown on camera, played by David Bailey. More recently, he provided the voice of the scientist for the 2009 film 9 and Batman's butler Alfred Pennyworth in Superman/Batman: Public Enemies.

Oppenheimer's repertoire also includes video games, voicing Dr. Piotr Ivanovich in Soldier of Fortune II: Double Helix, Prometheus in God of War II and Jandor the Airship Captain in Nox. He additionally voiced Harold in Fallout: Brotherhood of Steel, Dyntos and the Chariot Master in Kid Icarus: Uprising, and Darm and the Narrator in Ys.

In 2019, Oppenheimer guest-starred on the animated series Tigtone and featured in Toy Story 4 as Old Timer.

== Personal life ==
Oppenheimer married costume designer Marianna Elliott in 1958 and together they had three children. The couple divorced, but they remarried in 1992 and they remained married until her death in 2003. In March 2025, Oppenheimer was unable to attend a local convention because he contracted pneumonia.

== Filmography ==
=== Films ===
Year	Title	Role	Notes
1966	Gamera the Invincible	Dr. Contrare	
1967	Gunn	Whiteside	Credited as Allan Oppenheimer
1968	How to Save a Marriage and Ruin Your Life	Everett Bauer	
1968	Star!	Andre Charlot, Producer	
1968	Up Tight!	Unctuous Man in Arcade	
1969	The Maltese Bippy	Adolph Springer	
1970	Little Big Man	Major	
1972	The Groundstar Conspiracy	General Hackett	
1973	The Thief Who Came to Dinner	Insurance Man	
1973	Westworld	Chief Supervisor	
1975	Win, Place or Steal	Lt. Mannite	
1975	The Lives of Jenny Dolan	Springfield	
1975	The Hindenburg	Albert Breslau	
1976	Helter Skelter	Aaron Stovitz	
1976	Freaky Friday	Mr. Joffert	
1978	Record City	Blind Man	
1979	A Pleasure Doing Business	Marvin	
1980	Private Benjamin	Rabbi	
1981	Macbeth	Duncan	
1982	Mighty Mouse in the Great Space Chase	Mighty Mouse, Oil Can Harry, Swifty, Narrator, additional voices	Voice
1984	The NeverEnding Story	Falkor, Gmork, Rockbiter	Voices
1985	The Secret of the Sword	Skeletor, Man-At-Arms, Cringer / Battle Cat, Bald Rebel, Chef Alan	Voices
1985	He-Man & She-Ra: A Christmas Special	Skeletor, Man-At-Arms, Zipper	Voices
1988	BraveStarr: The Movie	Handlebar, Outlaw Scuzz, Stampede	Voices
1988	Moving	Mr. Cadell	
1989	Little Nemo: Adventures in Slumberland	Oomp	Voice
1992	Love Field	Announcer	
1993	Invisible: The Chronicles of Benjamin Knight	Dr. Knox	
1994	Trancers 5: Sudden Deth	Farr	
1997	Culture		
2008	Juan Frances: Live	Mr. French	
2009	The Secret Life of Bees	Additional voices	
2009	9	The Scientist	Voice
2009	Superman/Batman: Public Enemies	Alfred Pennyworth	Voice
2014	Foxcatcher	Du Point Dynasty Narrator	Voice
2017	Best Fiends: Boot Camp	King Slug	
2019	Toy Story 4	Old Timer	Voices
2022	Chip 'n Dale: Rescue Rangers	He-Man, Skeletor	Voices

=== Television ===
Year	Title	Role	Notes
1964	The Defenders	Dr. Frick	
1966	The Felony Squad	Ed Clark	
1966	The F.B.I.	Ludovic Krols	
1966–1967	I Spy	Colonel Benkovsky	
1967	It's About Time	Pettijohn	
1967	He & She	Murray Mouse	
1967	Judd for the Defense	District Attorney Tom Rogers	
1967	Get Smart	Agent 498	
1967–1969	Hogan's Heroes	4 episodes: Colonel Sitzer, Herman Freitag, Major Byron Buckles, Wilhelm	
1968	The Andy Griffith Show	Mr. Ruskin	
1968	The Name of the Game	Harvey	
1968	Here Come the Brides	Benet	
1968–1971	The Mod Squad	2 episodes: Bob Ross, Phil Norval	
1969	Lancer	Dan'l Drew	
1969	The Queen and I	H.R. Martin	
1969	My Friend Tony	Dr. Mink	
1969	The Bill Cosby Show	Dwight McDevitt	
1969	Ironside	Arnold Cane	
1969	The Mod Squad	Phil Norval	
1969–1970	That Girl	4 episodes: Dr. Globe, Morgan Jerome, Mr. Katz, Stewart Hurly	
1969–1970	Here Come the Brides	2 episides: Benet, Victor	
1970	I Dream of Jeannie	Congressman Farragut	
1970	Hastings Corner	Dr. Byron Dorman	
1970	My World and Welcome to It	The Principal	
1970	Three for Tahiti	Cecil Barrett	
1970	The Governor & J.J.	Mr. Federenko	
1970	The High Chaparral	Sweets	
1970	The Bold Ones: The Lawyers	George Hartnell	
1971	Love, American Style	Captain Blodgett	
1971	Inside O.U.T.	Edgar Winston	
1971	The Good Life	Rolls Royce manager	
1971	McCloud	Mervin Simmons	
1971	The Jimmy Stewart Show	Prof. Lokacs	
1971	Nichols	Averrel	
1971-1974	The Partridge Family	3 episodes: Wink Burgess, Byron Atwater, Lorenzo Bernard	
1971–1972	The Courtship of Eddie's Father	Sy Freeman	
1971–1972	Bonanza	3 episodes: Darius Dalrymple, Ernesto, Wentworth	
1971–1972	Insight	2 episodes: Marty, Sergeant Varron	
1971–1972	The Doris Day Show	2 episodes: Marvin Patterson, The Doctor	
1972	The Paul Lynde Show	Fletcher Lyons	
1972	Bewitched	Blades Buckholtzer	
1972	Here's Lucy	2 episodes: Dr. Parker, Herb Hinkley	
1973	Butch Cassidy	Additional voices	
1973	Goober and the Ghost Chasers	Additional voices	
1973	Speed Buggy	Additional voices	
1973	The New Scooby-Doo Movies	Windmaker #4	Voice
1973	Inch High, Private Eye	Additional voices	
1973	Wait Till Your Father Gets Home	Additional voices	
1973–1974	The Six Million Dollar Man	Dr. Rudy Wells	
1974, 1979	ABC Afterschool Special	First Cadet, de Brigny, John Hocker	Voice, 2 episodes
1974	Valley of the Dinosaurs	Gorok	Voice
1974	Hong Kong Phooey	Additional voices	
1975	Uncle Croc's Block	Fraidy Cat, Jasper Catdaver, Captain Eddie Kittenbacker, Cloud Nine, additional voices	Voice
1975	Fraidy Cat	Fraidy Cat, Jasper Catdaver, Captain Eddie Kittenbacker, Cloud Nine, additional voices	Voice
1975	The Tom & Jerry Show	Ringmaster, Sapstone	Voice, 2 episodes
1976–1978	The Scooby-Doo Show	Scooby-Dum, Jim Rivets, Mr. Collins, Tarlof, Officer Oldfield, Squire Marley, Jean Pierre Baptiste, Chin Wong Sing	Voice
1976–1979	Tarzan, Lord of the Jungle	Tomos, Orbin, Phobeg	Voice
1977	Tail Gunner Joe	Eisenhower Publicist	Television film
1977	Washington: Behind Closed Doors	Simon Cappell	
1977	CB Bears	Sidney Merciless	Voice
1977	Scooby's All-Star Laff-A-Lympics	Additional voices	
1977	Space Sentinels	Man-Wolf, Morpheus	Voice, 2 episodes
1977	Captain Caveman and the Teen Angels	Additional voices	Episode: "The Mystery Mansion Mix-Up"
1977	The All New Superfriends Hour	Dr. Cranum (in "The Brain Machine"), (in "The Secret Four"), Hydronoid #2 (in "Invasion of the Hydronoids"), Doctor Fright (in "Doctor Fright"), Wolfman (in "The Man Beasts of Xra"), The Marsh Monster (in "The Marsh Monster"), Captain Shark (in "The Protector"), Gentleman Ghost (in "The Ghost"), Scientist (in "The Ghost")	Voice, 7 episodes
1977	Hawaii Five-O	Bernie Fryer	Episode: "The Friends of Joey Kalima"
1978	The Ghost of Flight 401	Barton	
1978	Peeping Times	Miles Rathbourne	
1978	Battle of the Planets	Additional voices	
1978–1979	Fabulous Funnies	Captain Katzenjammer, Inspector, Gaylord, Irwin, Grelber, additional voices	Voice
1978–1979	Fangface	Additional voices	
1979	ABC Weekend Special	Additional voices	2 episodes
1979	Blind Ambition	George Simonson	
1979–1980	The New Adventures of Mighty Mouse and Heckle & Jeckle	Mighty Mouse, Oil Can Harry, Swifty, Narrator, additional voices	
1979–1981	The Plastic Man Comedy/Adventure Show	Toyman, Half-Ape	Voice
1979–1982	The New Adventures of Flash Gordon	Ming the Merciless, Hans Zarkov, Gundar the Desert Hawk	Voice
1980	Drak Pack	Count Dracula	Voice
1980	The Lone Ranger	Additional voices	
1980–1981	Thundarr the Barbarian	Mindok the Mind Menace, Muragg, Old Wizard	Voice, 2 episodes
1980–1982	Scooby-Doo and Scrappy-Doo	Additional voices	
1981	Blackstar	Carpo, Overlord	Voice
1981–1982	The Kid Super Power Hour with Shazam!	Uncle Marvel, Doctor Sivana, Tawky Tawny, Shazam	Voice
1981–1982	Trollkins	Sheriff Pudge Trollism	Voice
1981–1982	Hero High	Narrator, Mr. Sampson	Voice
1981–1989	The Smurfs	Vanity Smurf, Father Time	Voice
1982	My Smurfy Valentine	Vanity Smurf	Voice, television film
1982	Divorce Wars: A Love Story	Arthur Lazar	Television film
1982	Mama's Family	Mayor Tutweller	
1982	The Scooby & Scrappy-Doo/Puppy Hour	Additional voices	
1982	Richie Rich	Additional voices	
1982	The Smurfs Christmas Special	Vanity Smurf	Voice, television film
1982–1985	Knight Rider	General Duncton, Joe Lewis	
1983	The Smurfic Games	Vanity Smurf	Voice, television film
1983–1985	He-Man and the Masters of the Universe	Skeletor, Cringer / Battle Cat, Man-At-Arms, Mer-Man, Buzz-Off, Roboto, Chef Alan, Nepthu, Chimera, Additional voices	Voice
1985	Challenge of the GoBots	Mobius	Voice, episode: "Genius and Son"
1985	The Wuzzles	Rhinokey, Crocosaur, Mr. Packcat	Voice
1985	The 13 Ghosts of Scooby-Doo	Mirror Demon, Professor Fantazmo	Voice, 2 episodes
1985–1986	The Transformers	Beachcomber, Breakdown, Seaspray, Warpath	Voice
1985–1987	She-Ra: Princess of Power	Skeletor, Cringer / Battle Cat, Man-At-Arms, Spyster, Additional voices	Voice
1986	The Centurions	Dr. Gates	Voice
1986	Ghostbusters	Prime Evil, Fangster, Long John Scarechrome	Voice
1986	Rambo: The Force of Freedom	Sam Trautman	Voice
1986	Karate Kommandos	President	Voice
1986	Strong Medicine	Dr. Townsend	Voice
1987	Bionic Six	Professor Amadeus Sharp, Metalhand	Voice
1987	Tis The Season To Be Smurfy	Vanity Smurf	Voice, television film
1987	Blondie & Dagwood	Julius Dithers	Voice, TV special
1987–1988	BraveStarr	Handlebar, Outlaw Scuzz, Stampede	Voice
1987–1988	Snorks	Additional voices	4 episodes
1987–1990	DuckTales	Colonel Beaureguard DuBark, All My Ducklings Actor, Von Doghausen	Voice, 3 episodes
1988	A Pup Named Scooby-Doo	Additional voices	Season 1
1988	Scooby-Doo! and the Reluctant Werewolf	Mummy, Swamp Thing	Voice, television film
1988	The New Yogi Bear Show	Additional voices	
1988	Superman	Jonathan Kent	Voice
1988	Matlock	Dr. Linder	Episode: "The Heiress"
1988–1989	Slimer! and the Real Ghostbusters	Goolem, Morris P. Grout	Voice
1988–1989	Fantastic Max	Additional voices	
1988–1993	Murphy Brown	Eugene "Gene" Kinsella	
1989	Chip 'n Dale: Rescue Rangers	Plato, Aldrin Klordane, Captain Kernel	Voice
1989	X-Men: Pryde of the X-Men	Blob, Colonel Chaffey	Voice, television film
1989	Blondie & Dagwood: Second Wedding Workout	Julius Dithers	Voice, TV special
1990	Teenage Mutant Ninja Turtles	Dr. Polidorius	Voice, episode: "Rebel Without a Fin"
1990	The Wizard of Oz	Wizard	Voice
1991	TaleSpin	Principal Ed Pomeroy	Voice, episode: "Sheepskin Deep"
1991	Captain Planet and the Planeteers	Dr. Borzon	Voice, episode: "Meltdown Syndrome"
1991	Where's Waldo?	Additional voices	
1991	James Bond Jr.	The Chameleon	Voice
1991	Lucy & Desi: Before the Laughter	Arthur Lyons	
1991–1993	The Legend of Prince Valiant	Merlin	Voice
1992	Fish Police	Additional voices	Episode: "The Two Gils"
1992	Tom & Jerry Kids	Additional voices	3 episodes
1992	The Little Mermaid	Additional voices	Episode: "The Evil Manta"
1993	Bonkers	Additional voices	2 episodes
1993	I Yabba-Dabba Do!	Additional voices	Television film
1993	Star Trek: The Next Generation	Koroth	
1994	Star Trek: Deep Space Nine	Captain Keogh	
1994	Batman: The Animated Series	Auctioneer	Voice, episode: "Time Out of Joint"
1994	Fantastic Four	Watcher, Firelord	Voice, episode: "The Silver Surfer and the Coming of Galactus"
1994–1995	Phantom 2040	Professor Jack Archer	Voice
1997	Star Trek: Voyager	Nezu Ambassador	
1997–1998	The New Adventures of Zorro	Additional voices	
1998	Diagnosis: Murder	Leonard Gould	
1998	Invasion America	Additional voices	3 episodes
1998	Jumanji	Ludwig Von Ritcher	Voice, 2 episodes
2000	Rocket Power	Television Announcer	Voice, 2 episodes
2001–2004	Passions	Alistair Crane	
2003	The Big O	Norman Burg	Voice, English dub
2003, 2006	The Grim Adventures of Billy & Mandy	Father Time, Mighty Moe	Voice, 5 episodes
2004	Ghost in the Shell: Stand Alone Complex	Laoban	Voice, episode: "Red Data"
2005	Clifford's Puppy Days	Mr. Solomon	Voice, 2 episodes
2007	'Til Death	Mr. Wallach	Episode: "Performance Anxiety"
2014	Adventure Time	Darren the Ancient Sleeper, Sun	Voice, episode: "Something Big"
2019	Tigtone	Beautiful Horse Head	Voice, episode: "Tigtone and the Beautiful War"
2019	Forky Asks a Question	Old Timer	Voice, episode: "What is Time?"
2020	JJ Villard's Fairy Tales	Mirror Max, Roach, Flea Circus	Voice, episode: "Snow White"
2021	Masters of the Universe: Revelation	Moss Man	Voice
2022	He-Man and the Masters of the Universe	King Grayskull	Voice; final role

=== Video games ===
Year	Title	Role	Notes
1990	Ys I & II	Darm	English dub
1999	T'ai Fu: Wrath of the Tiger	Leopard Master	
1999	Revenant	Ogrok, Urgg	
2000	Nox	Captain, Necromancer, Lewis	
2000	Baldur's Gate II: Shadows of Amn	Guardian Telwyn, Sir Sarles, Mornmaster Thaddin Dawnhunter	
2000	Star Trek: Starfleet Command II: Empires at War	Additional voices	
2000	Invictus	Additional voices	
2001	Fallout Tactics: Brotherhood of Steel	Harold, Cult Ghoul Thug, Cult Ghoul Soldier	
2002	Earth & Beyond	Memnon	
2002	Soldier of Fortune II: Double Helix	Piotr Ivanovich	
2003	Lionheart: Legacy of the Crusader	Additional voices	
2004	Fallout: Brotherhood of Steel	Harold, Cult Ghoul Thug, Soldier	
2004	Baldur's Gate: Dark Alliance II	Additional voices	
2004	Law & Order: Justice Is Served	Charles Northcutt	
2004	The Bard's Tale	Additional voices	
2007	God of War II	Prometheus	
2008	Robert Ludlum's The Bourne Conspiracy	Additional voices	
2008	Tom Clancy's EndWar	Additional voices	
2012	Kid Icarus: Uprising	Dyntos, Chariot Master	English dub
2015	Fallout 4	Paladin Brandis	
2016	He-Man: Tappers of Grayskull	Skeletor	

== Awards and nominations ==
- 1991 – Nominated – Primetime Emmy Award for Outstanding Guest Actor in a Comedy Series as Eugene Kinsella in Murphy Brown
