= The Ghost Busters =

1975 American television series

- Created by: Marc Richards
- Starring: Forrest Tucker; Larry Storch; Bob Burns
- Theme music composer: Diane Hildebrand; Jackie Mills
- Opening theme: "Ghost-Busters" Theme (sung by Forrest Tucker and Larry Storch)
- Ending theme: "Ghost-Busters" Theme (instrumental)
- Composers: Yvette Blais; Jeff Michael
- Country of origin: United States
- Original language: English
- No. of seasons: 1
- No. of episodes: 15

Production
- Executive producers: Norm Prescott; Lou Scheimer; Dick Rosenbloom
- Producer: Norman Abbott
- Production location: United States
- Running time: 30 minutes (including commercials)
- Production company: Filmation

Original release
- Network: CBS
- Release: September 6 – December 13, 1975

Related
- Ghostbusters (1986 TV series)

The Ghost Busters is a live-action children's sitcom that ran on CBS in 1975, about a team of bumbling detectives who investigate ghostly occurrences. The show reunited Forrest Tucker and Larry Storch in slapstick roles similar to their characters in F Troop, and featured a third actor, Bob Burns, in a gorilla suit as their partner.

The series of fifteen episodes centered on the perpetual bumbling of the characters, good and evil alike. Character names referenced classic cinema, with both "Spencer" and "Tracy" alluding to actor Spencer Tracy, while "Kong" – not given to the gorilla – was a homage to King Kong.

After Columbia Pictures paid to license the Filmation series name for their (unrelated) 1984 film Ghostbusters, Filmation revived its series with an animated sequel in 1986.

== Premise ==
Spencer, Tracy, and Kong, bumbling paranormal detectives, billed themselves as "The Ghost Busters." Kong (Tucker) was the leader of the trio with Spencer (Storch) as his partner, and Tracy (a gorilla, played by Burns) as their assistant who also drove their barely-functional jalopy. Their headquarters was situated in a run down office building in an unspecified city. Outside of normal office equipment, plus a large armoire on which Tracy hung numerous hats including his trademark beanie with a propeller, the office itself was also dilapidated, with peeling wallpaper and a pay phone near the door as the Ghost Busters' only means of communicating with prospective clients.

Spencer's name on the office door was misspelled "Spenser." His first name was given as Eddie in the second episode, "Dr. Whatsisname." Kong's first name was never mentioned in the original series.

Each episode consisted of the same formula: in the pre-credits teaser, a ghost or monster- usually accompanied by a half-witted sidekick, would manifest and vow to wreak havoc or vengeance on a particular person, the city, or even the world. After the credits, Kong would send Tracy and Spencer to a general store to get their next assignment from the unseen "Zero" (voiced by Scheimer). The tape-recorded message was usually hidden inside an everyday object such as a bicycle, typewriter, or toy. In a parodic homage to Mission: Impossible, the recording would end with Zero saying, "This message will self-destruct in five seconds"; after Tracy counted down the seconds, the message- and often the item in which it was hidden, would explode in Tracy's face.

The Ghost Busters' assignments would invariably take them to the same place, a spooky castle with an adjoining graveyard on the city's outskirts; Kong would point out that the castle was the only one in or near the city. After a series of farcical chases, the ghouls would be cornered and dispatched back to the netherworld by means of a "Ghost De-Materializer", usually activated by Kong as he triumphantly shouted "Zap!"

=== Ghosts and monsters ===
The show frequently made use of ghostly characters and other characters from popular and literary culture, as well as real-life historical figures. These included:

- Dr. Frankenstein and his monster
- A Mummy
- The Red Baron
- The Canterville Ghost
- Count Dracula
- Billy the Kid
- Belle Starr
- The captain and first mate of the Flying Dutchman

== Cast ==
Larry Storch, Forrest Tucker and Bob Burns as Spencer, Kong and Tracy.

- Forrest Tucker as Jake Kong
- Larry Storch as Eddie Spencer
- Bob Burns as Tracy (credited as the gorilla's "trainer")
- Lou Scheimer as the voice of Zero

=== Guest stars ===
- Ted Knight as Simon de Canterville
- Kathy Garver as Carola de Canterville
- Lane Scheimer as Jesse James
- Richard Balin as Paul Revere/Martian
- Bob Burns as Construction Worker

=== Villains ===
- Lane Scheimer as The Ghost
- Johnny Brown as Fat-Man
- Billy Barty as The Rabbit
- Larry Storch as Big Al Caesar
- Bernie Kopell as Dr. Frankenstein
- William Engesser as Frankenstein's monster
- Len Lesser as Mr. C
- Dodo Denney as Sophia
- Lennie Weinrib as Harry Albert
- Stanley Adams as Cap'n Aloysius Beane
- Phil Bruns as Scroggs
- Tim Herbert as Phantom of Vaudeville
- Brian Berlin as Elmo
- Barbara Rhoades as Queen Forah
- Richard Balin as Mummy/Abominable Snowman
- Ann Morgan Guilbert as Witches
- Leigh Christian as Salem
- Huntz Hall as Gronk
- Marty Ingels as Billy the Kid
- Brooke Tucker as Belle Starr
- Dena Dietrich as Countess Dracula
- Billy Holms as Count Dracula
- Severn Darden as Dr. Jekyll
- Joe E. Ross as Mr. Hyde
- Howard Morris as The Red Baron
- Robert Easton as Sparks
- Jim Backus as Eric the Red
- Lisa Todd as Brunhilda
- Carl Ballantine as Merlin the Magician
- Ina Balin as Morgan le Fay
- Ronny Graham as Dr. Centigrade

== Production ==
In an interview conducted with Bob Burns III in 2007, he revealed that all 15 episodes were taped in a span of 9 weeks, every other day. Burns also revealed that the show did well enough in the ratings to warrant a second season, coming in at number two behind The Shazam!/ISIS Hour, but Filmation decided instead to put more money into its number-one program, thus canceling the show after one season. Though the series ended, reruns were broadcast for some time afterward.

== Episodes ==
No.	Title	Directed by	Written by	Original release date	Prod. code
1	"The Maltese Monkey"	L.A. Peerce	Marc Richards	September 6, 1975	#83001
The Ghost Busters must stop the Fat Man and the Rabbit from summoning the ghost of gangster Big Al Caesar, who will help them steal the stuff dreams are made of: the Maltese Monkey. Guest stars: Billy Barty, Johnny Brown
2	"Dr. Whatshisname"	L.A. Peerce	Marc Richards	September 13, 1975	#83002
Dr. Frankenstein returns, seeking the brain of the world's most gullible fool to transplant into his Monster. Enter Eddie Spencer. Guest stars: Bernie Kopell, William Engesser
3	"The Canterville Ghost"	Norman Abbott	Marc Richards	September 20, 1975	#83003
The Ghost Busters' assignment is to rid a haunted mansion of the cowardly ghost of Sir Simon de Canterville. They are unaware that master criminal "Mr. C" is after the priceless Canterville diamond worn by Sir Simon. Guest stars: Ted Knight, Kathy Garver, Len Lesser
4	"Who's Afraid of the Big Bad Wolf?"	L.A. Peerce	Marc Richards	September 27, 1975	#83004
Hoping to remove the curse of the werewolf from hapless Harry Albert, Gypsy fortuneteller Sophia comes seeking to steal the Baldus Lupus amulet that Spencer recently unearthed. Guest stars: Lennie Weinrib, Dodo Denney
5	"The Flying Dutchman"	Norman Abbott	Marc Richards	October 4, 1975	#83005
The ghostly captain and his sidekick from the Flying Dutchman take up residence in the castle, looking for new crewmen for their ship. And what "empty-headed scalawag" might fill the bill? Guest stars: Stanley Adams, Phil Bruns
6	"The Dummy's Revenge"	Norman Abbott	Marc Richards	October 11, 1975	#83006
The Phantom of Vaudeville and his ventriloquist's dummy Elmo return from the Great Beyond to settle a score with Slappy, Maxie, and Nijinsky, three vaudevillians who wronged them in the past (one of them wore an ape suit). Guess which trio gets mistaken for the three troublemakers. Guest stars: Tim Herbert, Brian Berlin
7	"A Worthless Gauze"	Norman Abbott	Marc Richards	October 18, 1975	#83007
The Ghost Busters become embroiled with Egyptian Queen Forah and her mummy as they search for the ape-sorcerer Simios, who in turn can bring them to Spen-Zah, possessor of the secret of immortality. Guest stars: Barbara Rhoades, Richard Balin
8	"Which Witch Is Which?"	L.A. Peerce	Marc Richards	October 25, 1975	#83008
The ghost of a witch reappears to get revenge against the descendant of Edward Spencer, the spell-dissolver in old Salem who brought ruin to witches. Matters become complicated when the ugly witch transforms herself into a seductive beauty who might lure the Ghost Busting Spencer to his doom. Guest stars: Huntz Hall, Ann Morgan Guilbert, Leigh Christian
9	"They Went Thataway"	L.A. Peerce	Marc Richards	November 1, 1975	#83009
Those ghost riders in the sky are the spirits of Billy the Kid and Belle Starr, back to round up a new gang of cattle rustlers. The Ghost Busters disguise themselves as cowboys to get the Dematerializer drop on 'em. Guest stars: Marty Ingels, Brooke Tucker
10	"The Vampire's Apprentice"	L.A. Peerce	Marc Richards	November 8, 1975	#83010
The Ghost Busters may get the bite put on them when Count and Countess Dracula return from the Great Beyond in search of a warm-blooded donor. Guest stars: Dena Dietrich, Billy Holms
11	"Jekyll & Hyde: Together, for the First Time!"	Norman Abbott	Marc Richards	November 15, 1975	#83011
The ghost of Dr. Jekyll appears, and is bedeviled by his bumbling alter ego Mr. Hyde. But if he can find a dolt with no personality at all, he can neutralize the effects of the personality-splitting formula and rid himself of Hyde forever. Guest stars: Joe E. Ross, Severn Darden
12	"Only Ghosts Have Wings"	Norman Abbott	Marc Richards	November 22, 1975	#83012
The ghosts of the Red Baron and his mechanic Sparky return to repair their plane, the Spirit of Icarus, so that they can once more engage their enemies: Lord Smedly Hargroves and his grease monkey, Tracy Holmes-Harrington, who bear a striking resemblance to two of the Ghost Busters. Guest stars: Howard Morris, Robert Easton
13	"The Vikings Have Landed"	L.A. Peerce	Marc Richards	November 29, 1975	#83013
The ghosts of Erik the Red and Brunhilda return to plant a Viking banner and establish their claim to having discovered America prior to the loathsome Lothar the Hun. Guest stars: Jim Backus, Lisa Todd
14	"Merlin the Magician"	Norman Abbott	Marc Richards	December 6, 1975	#83014
Merlin and his jester Gronk are pursued from the Great Beyond by their nemesis Morgan le Fay, who intends to trap them in this era. The Ghost Busters befriend and assist the broken-down magician in his battle with the sorceress. Guest stars: Ina Balin, Huntz Hall, Carl Ballantine
15	"The Abominable Snowman"	Norman Abbott	Marc Richards	December 13, 1975	#83015
Spencer stumbles onto the scene when Dr. Centigrade is searching for a warm-blooded heart to transplant into the Abominable Snowman. The final episode of the series. Guest stars: Ronny Graham, Richard Balin

== Home media ==
There were at least three VHS tapes released by Continental Video during the 1980s, where the show was billed as The Original Ghostbusters.

BCI Eclipse LLC, under its Ink & Paint classic animation entertainment label, under license from Entertainment Rights PLC, released the entire series on Region 1 DVD on April 17, 2007. The 2-DVD set presents the 15 live-action episodes uncut, re-mastered, transferred from the original broadcast videotapes, and presented in their original production order. It also contains extensive special features including interviews, photo galleries, rare footage and trailers from BCI's Ink & Paint brand. Unlike many of BCI Ink & Paint's other Filmation releases, this release appears to have been sourced from the original NTSC videotapes (the show having been recorded on tape rather than shot on film).

Australia received the complete series on DVD in a two-disc set on July 11, 2016. Mill Creek Entertainment has announced a DVD rerelease.

== Sequel ==
After the success of the 1984 Columbia Ghostbusters film, the Filmation show was revived in 1986 as an animated series, with Kong and Spencer's sons, Jake and Eddie Jr., inheriting their fathers' business (and Tracy the Gorilla) in Ghostbusters.
