= Uncle Croc's Block =

- Title card
- Genre: Live-action/animation
- Starring: Charles Nelson Reilly; Jonathan Harris; Alfie Wise
- Voices of: Linda Gary (uncredited); Kenneth Mars; Allan Melvin; Alan Oppenheimer; Robert Ridgely; Lou Scheimer (uncredited); Jay Scheimer (uncredited); Lennie Weinrib
- Country of origin: United States
- Original language: English

Production
- Executive producers: Norm Prescott; Lou Scheimer; Dick Rosenbloom
- Running time: 60 minutes (later 30 minutes)
- Production company: Filmation

Original release
- Network: ABC
- Release: September 6, 1975 – February 14, 1976

Uncle Croc's Block is an hour-long American live-action/animated television series produced by Filmation, and broadcast on ABC in 1975–76. The show was a parody of live kids' shows but with (as MeTV would later describe it) a "bitter edge".

The series premiered at 10:30 am ET on September 6, 1975, as part of ABC's "Funshine Saturday" block. Uncle Croc's Block was up against the second half of the popular The Shazam!/Isis Hour (another Filmation property) and Far Out Space Nuts on CBS and Run, Joe, Run and Return to the Planet of the Apes on NBC. The show, which was fitted with an adult laugh track, was shortened to 30 minutes, then scrapped on February 14, 1976, after half a season on the air.

Its poor performance ended ABC's relationship with Filmation, though its animated segments later resurfaced in syndication and home media.

== Plot ==
Charles Nelson Reilly played the eponymous Uncle Croc, a crocodile that hated his job as the show's host and made only the barest of efforts to hide his contempt. Also featured were Alfie Wise (originally Johnny Silver) as his rabbit sidekick, Mr. Rabbit Ears, and Jonathan Harris as Basil Bitterbottom, the show-within-a-show's frustrated director. A motorcycle-riding bird named Koo Koo Knievel (a parody of stuntman Evel Knievel) popped out of a clock to announce when it was "Star Time", and a "celebrity" guest would appear.

=== Star Time ===
Each episode contained a "Star Time" segment in which parodies of popular characters appeared, usually making denigrating remarks about the show and/or its staff, and demonstrating their abilities (or lack thereof). Guests included:

- Captain Klangeroo (portrayed by Robert Ridgely) is Uncle Croc's idol and rival TV show host. He is a parody of Captain Kangaroo.
  - Mr. Mean Jeans (portrayed by Huntz Hall) is Captain Klangeroo's angry sidekick. He is a parody of Mr. Greenjeans.
- Sherlock Domes (portrayed by Carl Ballantine) is a detective who thinks someone has committed a crime. is a parody of Sherlock Holmes.
  - Dr. Watkins (portrayed by Stanley Adams) is the sidekick of Sherlock Domes. He is a parody of Dr. Watson.
- Witchie Goo Goo (portrayed by Phyllis Diller) is a witch shows up on a different cleaning tool when her broom is in the shop and her prince-conjuring spell always summons a never-willing Basil to her. She is a parody of Witchiepoo from H.R. Pufnstuf.
- Junie the Teenage Genie (portrayed by Alice Ghostley) is an allegedly teenaged genie. She is a parody of Jeannie from I Dream of Jeannie with a bit of Sabrina the Teenage Witch.
- Billy Bratson is a boy who says "Shazowie" to turn into the non-heroic superhero Captain Marbles (portrayed by Marvin Kaplan) in the same way Billy Batson transformed into Captain Marvel by saying "Shazam!".
- Steve Exhaustion, The $6.95 Man (portrayed by Robert Ridgely) is a cyborg that always falls apart. He is a parody of Steve Austin, The Six Million Dollar Man.
- Bogey Bear is a manic-depressive bear. He is a parody of Yogi Bear.
- Miss Invis is a woman who falsely claims to be able to make herself invisible.

=== Cartoon segments ===
The show also included the cartoon shorts:

- M*U*S*H (short for Mangy Unwanted Shabby Heroes): Sled dogs Colonel Flake, Major Hank Sideburns, Coldlips, General Upheaval (all voiced by Kenneth Mars), Bullseye, Trooper Joe, Hilda, and Sonar (all voiced by Robert Ridgely) work at a medical outpost in the frozen wasteland of Upper Saboonia. This cartoon is a lampoon of M*A*S*H. In his 2012 autobiography, Lou Scheimer stated that he had written the segment to be intentionally unfunny, a concept that Scheimer found to be a better concept than ABC did. While 30 episodes of the show were written, 23 of the said episodes were fully produced, and 14 of them have not surfaced.
- Fraidy Cat: Fraidy Cat (voiced by Alan Oppenheimer) has lost his eight lives and only has one life left which he is wanting to make it last. He is cursed with the ability to involuntarily summon the ghosts of his eight past lives, personified as their respective time periods (voiced by Allan Melvin, Lennie Weinrib and Alan Oppenheimer) as well as trying to say "nine" which summons Cloud 9 (voiced by Alan Oppenheimer) who tries to claim Fraidy's life.
- Wacky and Packy: A prehistoric caveman named Wacky and his pet woolly mammoth Packy (both voiced by Allan Melvin) get washed into a cave during an earthquake and they end up getting transported two million years into modern times as they work to survive in this time period.

Of all of the aired cartoon segments, only Fraidy Cat had the longest continued existence, with the last official home media release being distributed by BCI on a DVD set in 2006, 31 years after the show's conclusion.

The voice cast part of the end credits had a disclaimer stating "All voice and vocal impressions were performed by the cast and not by the actual celebrities themselves".

== Episodes ==
1. A Star is Corn -
2. Bitterbottom's Better Bargain -
3. El Cheapo -
4. Haunted House -
5. Inferior Decorator -
6. Mr. Nice Guy -
7. No Doze -
8. Oh Unlucky Day -
9. One of Our Photo Albums is Missing -
10. Overworked and Underpaid -
11. The Big Switch -
12. The Brat -
13. The Secret Admirer -
14. We Tried Hard -
15. You Have No Business in Show Business -

== Production ==
=== Cancellation ===
As a result of the show's poor performance, ABC president Fred Silverman severed all ties with Filmation and began commissioning its Saturday-morning cartoons from Hanna-Barbera, with which he had a working relationship during his time at CBS, and from Sid and Marty Krofft, whose Krofft Supershow would replace it on the lineup the next year. Though Filmation had had several series end after short runs, none had ever been cancelled before completing their runs up to that point. Filmation noted that the cancellation actually saved the studio money because ABC had already paid for a full season and now Filmation did not have to follow through on paying to produce the remaining episodes. In an attempt to save ratings, Filmation had planned to repackage the repeated Groovie Goolies episodes as a new segment, redubbed the Super Fiends (capitalizing on the title of rival Hanna-Barbera's Super Friends), but the show was shelved before the change could be incorporated. The animated segments were featured in the Filmation syndicated package, The Groovie Goolies and Friends, and also resurfaced in the home video market in the 1980s.
