= Filmation =

American production company (1962–1989)

Filmation Associates
- Final logo, used from 1983 to 1989
- Founded: 1962; 64 years ago
- Founders: Norm Prescott; Lou Scheimer
- Defunct: February 3, 1989; 37 years ago
- Fate: Studio closed by Group W and library sold to L'Oréal
- Headquarters: Woodland Hills, Los Angeles, California, United States
- Products: Television shows Television shorts Television specials Television movies Theatrical films
- Parent: TelePrompTer Corporation (1969–1981); Westinghouse Broadcasting Company (1981–1989)

Filmation Associates was an American production company founded by Lou Scheimer in 1962. Filmation produced animated and live-action productions and was last located in Woodland Hills, California.

In 1989, Filmation was closed by parent company Group W Productions and its intellectual properties were acquired by French cosmetic firm L'Oréal. Since then, the rights to Filmation's productions have changed hands several times and are today owned primarily by DreamWorks Animation.

Notable series that Filmation produced include the DC Comics and Archie Comics animated adaptations, Fat Albert and the Cosby Kids, Star Trek: The Animated Series, its version of Ghostbusters and the two adaptations of the Mattel toyline Masters of the Universe (He-Man and the Masters of the Universe and She-Ra: Princess of Power).

== History ==
=== Background ===
From left to right: Norm Prescott, Hal Sutherland and Lou Scheimer.

Filmation rotary logo seen in the company’s shows and credits from 1969 until the departure of Norm Prescott from Filmation (in 1981-82).

Lou Scheimer and Filmation's main director Hal Sutherland met in 1957 while working at Larry Harmon Pictures on the made-for-TV Bozo and Popeye cartoons. Eventually Larry Harmon closed the studio by 1961. Scheimer and Sutherland went to work at a small company called True Line, one of whose owners was Marcus Lipsky, who then owned Reddi-wip whipped cream. SIB Productions, a Japanese firm with U.S. offices in Chicago, approached them about producing a cartoon called Rod Rocket. The two agreed to take on the work and also took on a project for Family Films, owned by the Lutheran Church–Missouri Synod, for ten short animated films based on the life of Christ. Paramount Pictures soon purchased SIB Productions, and True Line's staff increased, including the arrival of former radio disc jockey Norm Prescott, who became a partner in the firm. He had already been working on the animated feature Pinocchio in Outer Space which was primarily produced by Belvision Studios.

=== Peak era ===
They eventually left True Line, and Scheimer began working on commercials, including for Gillette and others, which began what became Filmation. He met lawyer Ira Epstein, who had worked for Harmon but had left the firm, and now put together the new corporation with Scheimer and Sutherland. It officially became Filmation Associates as of September 1962, so named because "We were working on film, but doing animation"; so putting them together yielded the portmanteau "Filmation".

Both Rod Rocket and the Life of Christ series credited "Filmation Associates" with "Production Design" in addition to Scheimer and Sutherland as directors. (SIB Productions, whose logo bore a resemblance to the original Filmation logo designed by Ted Littlefield, would soon go on to become "Sib-Tower 12 Productions" and produce the first few of Chuck Jones' Tom and Jerry films for MGM, until becoming MGM Animation/Visual Arts for the remainder of the films).

Norm Prescott brought in Filmation's first major project, Journey Back to Oz, an animated sequel to the MGM film The Wizard of Oz (1939). Begun in 1962, storyboarding, voice recording, and most of the music scoring and animation had been completed when financial challenges caused the project to be put on hold for nearly eight years.

In the meantime, the new Filmation studio turned their attention to a more successful medium, network television. For the next few years they made television commercials and some other projects for other companies and made an unsuccessful pilot film for a Marx Brothers cartoon series. They also tried to develop an original series named The Adventures of Stanley Stoutheart (later renamed Yank and Doodle) about a boy and a dog, but they were never able to sell it and almost closed down; until approached by DC Comics editor Mort Weisinger to do a Superman cartoon that premiered on CBS on September 10, 1966. This was followed by several of the other DC superheroes, and then, in 1968, the first Archie Show. Both series greatly helped Filmation's popularity to increase into the 1970s, when it scored big with several of its series.

Logo used from 1975 to 1982.

The Filmation studio was purchased by the TelePrompTer Corporation in 1969. Two years later, in 1971, Filmation and Warner Bros. signed an agreement to distribute cartoons for film and television. In 1981, while Prescott left the company, Westinghouse Electric Corporation, through its Group W Productions division, acquired Filmation along with its purchase of TelePrompTer's cable and entertainment properties.

In 1986, Filmation moved from Reseda, California, where it had been based for the past 19 years, to a larger studio in Woodland Hills.

=== Closing ===
In 1989, Group W sold Filmation to Paravision International, an investment consortium led by the French cosmetics company L'Oréal. Before that sale was complete, Group W shuttered the film studio on February 3, 1989, which left L'Oréal with only the Filmation library. This happened a day before the WARN Act went into effect requiring companies to give employees 60 days' notice before a mass layoff.

Filmation had been in decline for the prior three years due to the saturation of syndicated cartoons which made it increasingly difficult to sell its shows to television stations. Its 1987 Christmas movie Pinocchio and the Emperor of the Night had also been a box-office bomb. Additionally, Filmation had higher operating costs than the industry's average due to the insistence from Lou Scheimer himself on keeping all animation work in the United States instead of outsourcing to lower price studios in Asia as most of its competitors did. Also, the new European owners were only interested in Filmation's back catalogue and had no intention of keeping the studio opened.

The last shows produced by Filmation were Ghostbusters and BraveStarr, and the company's last production was the feature film Happily Ever After (a sequel to the story of Snow White); this film was produced from 1986 to 1988, and was theatrically released in the United States five years later, in 1993. Also, at the time of the closing, two new animated series, Bugzburg (a spin-off of Pinocchio and the Emperor of the Night, concerning insect characters who had shown up in that movie) and Bravo (a spin-off of BraveStarr), were beginning production.

== Production ==
=== Animation style ===
Like other producers of Saturday-morning cartoons, Filmation was more concerned with quantity rather than quality; however, it did make a number of attempts to rise above the standard animated fare and produce reasonably well-written cartoons. The best-known example of this is its animated adaptation Star Trek: The Animated Series, which included scripts contributed by well-known science fiction writers and starred most of the original cast. Other favorably remembered Filmation series included a 16-part animated serial of Flash Gordon, originally intended as a movie for theatrical release, Flash Gordon: The Greatest Adventure of All. The original film edit was only aired three times on NBC, years after the series was cancelled. Fat Albert and the Cosby Kids was another hailed series created by and starring Bill Cosby with an explicit educational focus. He-Man and the Masters of the Universe, based on the popular line of Mattel toys, opened up a new North American market for first-run television syndication for animation in the 1980s. The animated adaptations of the Archie Comics characters were also noteworthy for the original pop music produced for it, particularly the song "Sugar, Sugar", which was a No. 1 hit single.

In addition, certain episodes of He-Man and BraveStarr, in substance, and often animation, were pioneers in children's animated series of their time and paved the way for broader storytelling. Examples include He-Man's "The Problem with Power" which dealt with He-Man believing he had killed an innocent bystander. Another is "Teela's Quest" which introduced a now-famous mythology on the Sorceress being Teela's mother, who is thus the heir to the mantle of safeguarding Grayskull, the versed continuity shared between He-Man and She-Ra, among others. Other notable examples include the BraveStarr episode "The Price", which includes the death of a character due to drug addiction. The 1985 Fat Albert episode "Busted" was a direct homage to the primetime Scared Straight! specials. A first for American children's cartoons, the original airing of this episode included mild profanity that has, however, been edited out of re-airings and home video versions. Likewise, the scripts for Star Trek, which were often written by the same people who had written for the live-action version of the series, tended to be quite sophisticated, and garnered the first Emmy Award for the franchise.

==== Quality ====
Filmation had a reputation for exploiting the technique of limited animation to produce a number of animated series with a distinct look. This technique involved limiting of the number of frames per second (fps) to fewer than the standard 24 fps seen on film or 25/30 fps seen on video. Frames would be repeated to compensate for the deficiency, resulting in a "jerky" motion. Filmation also made heavy use of rotoscoping in later years (beginning with its Tarzan and Flash Gordon series). It also re-used the same animated sequences over and over, many times, to the point where the Filmation style was instantly recognizable. One example of this can be seen in She-Ra's and He-Man's transformation sequences.

This frequent use of stock footage saved production money, but often resulted in sacrifice of continuity. This was countered by cutting from one stock shot to another after only a second or two, long enough to set the scene but before the eye could notice all of the unexplained errors. This became part of the Filmation style during a period when most television and motion picture productions tended to run minimum shots of 4–5 seconds.

In contrast to the rapid jump cuts during action sequences, another Filmation trademark was the recurring use of long establishing shots in which the camera would pan slowly across a very wide background painting, thus filling up screen time with sequences requiring little or no animation. Filmation also pioneered other animation technologies, particularly in Flash Gordon, which included backlighting effects for the first time in American animation (they were already in use in Japan), including moire effects to represent energy fields (a technique that was later used in He-Man and in She-Ra). It also pioneered a unique method of generating 3-D vehicle animation by filming white-outlined black miniatures against black backgrounds using a computerized motion-control camera and high-contrast film, then printing the negatives onto acetate frame-by-frame, to create animation cels which were then hand-painted. This produced a three-dimensional effect that had been used by Disney in films such as One Hundred and One Dalmatians previously. It predated the modern use of 3-D computer animation for vehicles in 2-D animated productions. However, it had a distinctive "flicker" to it, because some of the painted lines went out and in of visibility as the miniatures moved.

Unlike many American studios, Filmation never relied on animation studios outside the United States for the bulk of its production; Ghostbusters and BraveStarr both state in the ending credits that they were "made entirely in the U.S.A." This occurred during a time when rival studio Hanna-Barbera shifted from saying in the final production credits (immediately before the production logo appearances) "A Hanna-Barbera Production" to "Produced in Association with: Wang Film Productions / Cuckoo's Nest Studios" which is located in Taiwan (along with H-B's own Philippines-based Fil-Cartoons). The quality of Filmation's "Made Entirely in the U.S.A." strategy was comparable to the outsourced animation. Filmation did, however, rely on outsourcing once, when the company created its animated Zorro series. It was animated by Tokyo Movie Shinsha of Japan; however, the storyboards and graphics were made by Filmation itself.

Filmation is also noteworthy for its background paintings under the direction of long-time department head Erv Kaplan, such as the purple-colored "night sky" backgrounds used in He-Man and She-Ra.

Characters, as well as plots, were typically run-of-the-mill for the time. For example, most episodes of Ghostbusters had the same scheme (bad guys develop an evil plan, the heroes are needed but always absent, Ghost Buggy the talking car complains about their dangerous position, Tracy the Gorilla pulls out of his back pack exactly the miscellaneous item the Ghostbuster needs in a moment of despair, Eddie doing a number of clumsy/stupid things, etc.); although as previously mentioned, Filmation made various attempts to rise above the norm. Many of the sound effects used in its cartoons are also very familiar, the majority of them being recycled from Hanna-Barbera (this was, and still is, a common trait among animation companies, though Filmation's copies of the Hanna-Barbera sound effects were of a distinctively lower quality), though the company's DC Comics cartoons of 1966–67 used more realistic sound effects.

Filmation received particular criticism for Lassie's Rescue Rangers, an animated continuation of the long-running live-action series Lassie. Lassie's co-creator and trainer, Rudd Weatherwax, said of the show, "That's not Lassie. That's trash." It drew a rare denunciation from the National Association of Broadcasters, which accused Filmation of corrupting the Lassie franchise with "violence, crime and stupidity." According to Scheimer, when he appeared at a fan convention to promote Star Trek: The Animated Series, he heard a fan express hope that the series would not "turn out like all the rest of Filmation's sh*t". Some people who worked at Filmation, including Mark Kausler, Don Bluth, John Kricfalusi, Eddie Fitzgerald, Sam Simon, Tom Ruegger, Paul Dini, and Will Finn, expressed their dislike for the company and the shows that they worked on.

=== Trademarks ===
A trademark of the company's productions, beginning in 1969, was a rotating, circular "Produced by" (and on some series, "Executive Producers") credit seen in the ending credits (and in later productions, the opening sequences) of Filmation programs, as a device that was supposedly created to allow Prescott and Scheimer to share equal billing. Previously, Scheimer's name had been placed above Prescott's. However, the later Filmation productions credited only Scheimer, in the form of his signature ("Lou Scheimer, (Executive) Producer"), starting with Gilligan's Planet (1982).

Many of its series—particularly the productions of the late 1970s and 1980s—are notable for imparting a simple moral or life-lesson (explained by a key character, in a child-friendly manner) in the epilogue.

=== Original characters ===
The studio created very few original animated characters. Two examples were Fraidy Cat, a timid feline who has lost eight of his nine lives, which come back to haunt him; and Wacky and Packy, a caveman and his pet mammoth (Packy refers to the latter character being a "pachyderm") who enter the modern age through a time warp. Both of these originally aired as segments of the Uncle Croc's Block series on ABC (hosted by Charles Nelson Reilly). In a period where comedy in cartoons was heavily scrutinized for violence and many shows duplicated the popular Scooby-Doo format, Filmation's strong point was its adaptations of popular television series, movies and other works, although at least one series, M*U*S*H (the first animated segment on Uncle Croc's Block), while not a direct adaptation, was inspired by the film (and later TV series) M*A*S*H. M*U*S*H is an acronym for Mangy Unwanted Shabby Heroes since all the character were dogs stationed in the Arctic.

== Film library ownership ==
The studio's intellectual property assets have changed hands on a number of occasions. The in-house productions (The Archie Show, Fat Albert and the Cosby Kids, etc.), which form a majority of the Filmation back catalog, were sold to Hallmark Cards in 1995, and were managed by its Hallmark Entertainment subsidiary. (Hallmark used what was left of Filmation's resources to launch their own animation studio that year, but they only produced two series, Monster Mania and Captain Simian and the Space Monkeys, before closing in 1996.) However, since the rest of Filmation's output was based on characters licensed from other companies, such titles are under the control of other studios (such as Skydance's CBS Media Ventures and Warner Bros. via Turner Entertainment Co. and DC Entertainment).

In March 2004, ownership of the Filmation in-house library, which was under the ownership of Hallmark, was sold to UK-based Entertainment Rights. Entertainment Rights has since made the revelation that when Hallmark converted all of its Filmation series to digital format in the 1990s, only PAL-format copies were made, with the original film negatives and print rolls apparently discarded, as well as the original sound masters and other archival material belonging to Filmation. This was due to Hallmark's previously unstated (but long-suspected) short-sighted policy of only distributing Filmation's in-house shows outside of the United States. As a result, many of Entertainment Rights' DVD releases (distributed by BCI Eclipse LLC in the United States prior to the latter company's folding) were based on the international versions (which have PAL prints).

Because they were taken from PAL-based transfers, without correction, these releases exhibit the so-called 576i speedup effect in which the soundtrack plays 4% too fast, which results in the pitch being a half-step higher than it was originally (see PAL and Telecine for more information). PAL-NTSC conversion artifacts also include softness and ghosting. The exception appears to be at least two titles from ER's library: Groovie Goolies, and the animated Ghostbusters series. These series appear to have been sourced from original NTSC transfers for their U.S. release by BCI. The Ghost Busters live-action series was, unlike most Filmation shows, shot on NTSC format tape (rather than film), so even if those did come from PAL masters, they would not have exhibited 576i speedup, as that only applies to material sourced from film masters. Other exceptions included the shows which were licensed properties, such as Star Trek: The Animated Series, which was owned by Paramount Television (now CBS Studios, which is now part of Skydance since 2025), and Shazam! (owned by Warner Bros./DC Comics, also become part of Skydance), because the master elements for those shows were turned over to the owners of those licensed properties years before the sale to Hallmark.

On April 1, 2009, it was announced that Entertainment Rights would be acquired by Boomerang Media and on May 11, 2009, it was announced that the subsidiaries and offices of Entertainment Rights would be absorbed under the name Classic Media.

In 2012, it was announced that Classic Media, owner of the Filmation library, would be acquired by DreamWorks Animation. DreamWorks Animation and its programming library, including those of Filmation (not including shows whose rights are owned by other companies, such as The New Adventures of Gilligan and Star Trek: The Animated Series), would later be acquired on August 22, 2016, by Universal Studios for $3.8 billion.

== Filmography ==
=== Live-action shows ===
Filmation incorporated live-action into some of its animated series. Series like The Hardy Boys and Archie's Funhouse featured live-action footage of an audience watching the bands perform and Fat Albert had segments featuring series creator Bill Cosby. The Kid Super Power Hour with Shazam!, was more of a hybrid—a live-action variety show with animated segments. Actors appeared as characters from the Hero High portion of the series, singing songs and telling jokes.

Filmation made six fully live-action series, including Space Academy, its spin-off Jason of Star Command, Ark II, Shazam! (based on the DC Comics character Captain Marvel), The Ghost Busters and The Secrets of Isis. In February 1982, the studio and SFM Media Corp co-produced a pilot for a game show named The Origins Game, hosted by Bob Eubanks.

==== The Ghost Busters ====
Filmation produced a live-action series called The Ghost Busters (1975), starring former F Troop stars Larry Storch and Forrest Tucker, with noted science-fiction fan and collector Bob Burns as "Tracy the Gorilla". The characters worked as paranormal investigators, working for an unseen "Chief" named "Zero" who delivered their "Ghost Busting Assignments" in whimsical disguised recording devices as in Mission: Impossible.

Nine years later, Columbia Pictures, who produced an unrelated 1984 movie of almost the same name, had to obtain the rights to the title from the company. Filmation capitalized on the popularity of the film by producing a new cartoon based on their earlier series. Like its other shows, it used stock footage heavily; in one episode, character designs and animation sequences were recycled from the Groovie Goolies series of nearly 15 years earlier.

To avoid confusion, the animated series based on the film was called The Real Ghostbusters. As a dig on the Filmation series, an episode was written about a group of fraudulent ghost fighters, trying to steal the "Real" Ghostbusters' business and thunder.

=== Feature films ===
Filmation also ventured into the feature film business. With their success in television firmly established by 1970, the company became profitable enough to return to the shelved Journey Back to Oz project, completing the animation and some minor voiceover work begun in 1962, and finished the film in 1971. It would take another year for Journey to be released theatrically in the United Kingdom, two more years before its 1974 U.S. release, and yet another two (1976) before it finally found its audience in network television, the very medium in which Filmation became successful. There, the film was expanded with live-action segments featuring Bill Cosby, who was in the midst of his success with the studio's Fat Albert and the Cosby Kids.

A deal with Warner Bros. yielded Treasure Island and Oliver Twist, but left several others unproduced.

In its final years, Filmation produced feature films of its He-Man and She-Ra franchises (The Secret of the Sword), as well as continuations to established stories, such as Pinocchio and the Emperor of the Night (1987) and Happily Ever After (1989; unreleased until 1993). In 1986, Omega Entertainment inked a worldwide television pact with Filmation in order to distribute the company's non-animated products, such as theatrical feature films, for worldwide TV distribution. Also that year, on October 22, Filmation is beginning to serve as representative for three animated films at the MIFED (Mercato internazionale del film e del documentario), in order to cleaning up unsold territories on various Filmation productions, which accordingly hit by a lawsuit from The Walt Disney Company back in 1985 in order to prevent making films that the company claims to be based on Disney classics.

== Voice talent ==
Like other animation studios, Filmation had its stock company of voiceover actors. Some of the most famous included Larry Storch, Dallas McKennon (best known as the voice of Archie in the Archie cartoon and as Cincinnatus, in the Daniel Boone TV series), Bud Collyer, the original radio voice of Superman, reprised the role for Filmation for their late 1960s version of the Man of Steel; Adam West and Burt Ward (who recreated their roles as "Batman and Robin" from their 1960s live-action series for Filmation's 1977 animated incarnation), Jane Webb, and good friends and colleagues Edward Asner and Linda Gary (Gary voiced a majority of Filmation's work in the 1980s), along with John Erwin (voice of Reggie Mantle, and later the voice of He-Man), Alan Oppenheimer (character actor in TV and film), Ted Knight, George DiCenzo (John Blackstar, Hordak, Bow on She-Ra), Bill Cosby (voice of Fat Albert and himself), Melendy Britt, Howard Morris, Pat Fraley, Charlie Adler, Ed Gilbert, Susan Blu, Peter Cullen, Frank Welker, and Lou Scheimer (either uncredited, or under the pseudonym of "Erik (sometimes "Eric") Gunden").

=== Background musical talent ===
For the company's 1960s superhero efforts, composer John Gart (under the stage name John Marion) and music supervisor Gordon Zahler created strong themes and backing cues using a large orchestra, until the Batman entry in 1968, which used sparser production and jazzier themes.

The company's 1960s adventure series Journey to the Center of the Earth (1967) and Fantastic Voyage (1968) likewise used sparser music production. Journey made heavier emphasis on guitar than the company's previous series, while Voyage made use of deliberately haunting woodwinds to create a science fiction flavor.

According to the booklets accompanying some of the DVDs of Filmation's shows, composer Ray Ellis (who was assisted by his son Marc Ellis) had produced the background music for most Filmation series under the pseudonyms "Yvette Blais and Jeff Michael". Yvette Blais was Ellis's wife, while "Jeff" and "Michael" were the names of producer Norm Prescott's two sons (exactly what role Prescott played in the music, other than hiring the composers and musicians, is unclear). The full-length features Treasure Island and Oliver Twist credit "George Blais". Ellis's name does appear in Archie and Sabrina the Teenage Witch credits and both "Ray Ellis", and "Jeff Michaels" appear side by side on Groovie Goolies credits, where "Ellis" is credited for "Sabrina background music", and "Michaels" is credited for "Groovie Goolies background music".

Much of Ellis's background music in the late 1960s had a distinct, richly orchestrated sound not found on many other made-for-TV cartoon series of that period; though as time went on, it became more contemporary and often synthesized. Ellis's work at the studio lasted from 1968 to 1982. Haim Saban and Shuki Levy composed and produced the studio's music for He-Man and She-Ra (during 1983–1986), along with the other studios for which they produced music scores. Frank W. Becker provided the music for Filmation's final animated series BraveStarr.

In 1977, Dean Andre (Wallschlaeger), a 24-year-old composer/recording artist/producer, began writing theme and featured music for Filmation. His first series was Archie's Bang-Shang Lalapalooza Show. He went on to compose themes for The New Adventures of Mighty Mouse and Heckle & Jeckle and Fabulous Funnies (featuring the voices of June Foray and Alan Oppenheimer). Dean also lent his vocal talents to Filmation for thematic and featured music that he composed and produced for A Snow White Christmas, Sport Billy and The Kid Super Power Hour with Shazam!. In 1981, Dean also took on the position of musical director for The Kid Super Power Hour with Shazam!.

Filmation routinely included a plug for its music publisher, Shermley Music (ASCAP), in the closing credits of most of its series. This has never been common practice on American television.

== See also ==
- Animation in the United States in the television era
