= Fabulous Funnies =

1978–1979 American animated television series

- Voices of: June Foray; Jayne Hamil; Alan Oppenheimer; Bob Holt; Lou Scheimer
- Theme music composer: Dean Andre; Ray Ellis
- Composer: Ray Ellis
- Country of origin: United States
- Original language: English
- No. of seasons: 1
- No. of episodes: 13

Production
- Executive producers: Lou Scheimer; Norm Prescott
- Producer: Don Christensen
- Running time: 30 minutes
- Production company: Filmation

Original release
- Network: NBC
- Release: September 9, 1978 – September 1, 1979

Fabulous Funnies is a 1978–79 American Saturday morning animated TV series produced by Filmation. The show aired for one season from September 9, 1978, to December 1, 1979, on NBC, airing 13 episodes.

The show is an anthology of stories based on American comic strips, including Broom Hilda, Alley Oop, The Captain and the Kids, Nancy, Emmy Lou and (for one episode) Tumbleweeds. The character designs closely mimic the comic strips, so the animators had to animate in several different styles for the program.

It was noted by critics that the show's comic potential was blunted by NBC's demand that the show promote pro-social messages for the child audience. This was especially noticeable when rowdy characters such as The Captain and the Kids were obliged to spread messages of politeness and restraint. The Los Angeles Times called the show's moralizing "heavy-handed".

== Episode structure ==
Each episode contains Broom Hilda, Alley Oop and The Captain and the Kids, with other segments appearing on a rotating basis. Foozy from Alley Oop served as the show's host and mainly spoke in rhyme.

Each episode has an overall theme, based on a pro-social message. For example, "Fear" deals with overcoming trepidation, and includes Foozy's narration, "We're here to make one thing clear, a lot of woe comes from undue fear." Other topics include drinking, smoking, schoolwork, health, voting and the environment.

== Rights problem ==
The first episode of Fabulous Funnies aired with a segment based on Tumbleweeds, but Filmation didn't actually have the rights to the strip. The strip's creator, Tom K. Ryan, said that he would give approval for his comic to appear in the show pending a look at the scripts and designs, but the producers believed that he had already given permission. After the first episode aired, Ryan called producer Lou Scheimer and said that he wouldn't sue, as long as the strip didn't appear in any further episodes.

== Voice cast ==
The voice cast included:

- June Foray: Broom Hilda, Sluggo, Ooola, Hans and Fritz Katzenjammer, additional voices
- Jayne Hamil: Nancy, Emmy Lou, Taffy, additional voices
- Alan Oppenheimer: Captain Katzenjammer, Inspector, Gaylord, Irwin, Grelber, Hazy Woods ("Colmic-ition"), additional voices
- Bob Holt: Alley Oop, King Guzzle, Tumbleweeds, additional voices
- Lou Scheimer (uncredited): Dinny, Hazy Woods ("Drinking"), additional voices

== Reception ==
In The Encyclopedia of American Animated Television Shows, David Perlmutter writes: "For the most part, they were effective adaptations on a visual level. However, the advanced age of most of the properties (Katzenjammer dated to 1898, Alley Oop and Nancy to the 1930s, Broom Hilda to 1970) meant that adapting them to the restrictions of television animation in the 1970s required unwelcome compromises to the material that impaired their abilities to tell stories as effectively as they had in the comics." George Woolery agrees in Children's Television: The First Thirty-Five Years that the show "sacrificed humor and fun for preaching."

In Television Cartoon Shows, Hal Erickson adds, "What, pray tell, did the media critics expect when such marvelously uninhibited, havoc-wreaking characters like Alley Oop and the Katzenjammer Kids were required to warn the kids at home to behave like responsible ladies and gentlemen? Especially in the case of the Katzenjammers, the whole point of newspaper strips in the first place was to give rule-bound children (and adults!) a cathartic outlet for their latent antisocial tendencies. With the noblest motivations in mind, Fabulous Funnies managed to rob its characters of their very reason for being."

== Episodes ==
No.	Title	Original release date	Prod. code
1	"Bods and Clods"	September 9, 1978	FN #51004
2	"Comic-ition"	September 16, 1978	FN #51003
3	"But, Would You Want Your Sister to Marry an Artist?"	September 23, 1978	FN #51006
4	"Save Our World"	September 30, 1978	FN #51005
5	"Animal Crack-Ups"	October 7, 1978	FN #51001
6	"School Daze"	October 14, 1978	FN #51002
7	"Money Madness"	October 21, 1978	FN #51007
8	"Fear"	October 28, 1978	FN #51008
9	"Death"	November 4, 1978	FN #51010
10	"Safety Second"	November 11, 1978	FN #51011
11	"Drinking"	November 18, 1978	FN #51012
12	"Shot in the Light"	November 25, 1978	FN #51013
13	"Different Jokes for Different Folks"	December 1, 1978	FN #51009

== See also ==
- Archie's TV Funnies, an earlier Filmation program featuring many of the same characters
