= Suzy's World =

- Written by: Jeremy Dillon; Andrew McKenzie; Kate Guthrie; Erica Kent
- Directed by: Jeremy Dillon; Mitchell Hawkes; Mary Phillips
- Creative director: Tina Hart
- Presented by: Suzy Cato
- Opening theme: "Suzy's World"
- Ending theme: "Suzy's World" (instrumental)
- Composers: Stephen Buckland; Steve Robinson
- Country of origin: New Zealand
- Original language: English
- No. of series: 4
- No. of episodes: 263

Production
- Executive producer: Gerben Cath
- Producers: Nerida Cath; Mary Phillips
- Editor: John Bungey
- Camera setup: Sean Rundle
- Production company: Treehut Productions

Original release
- Network: TV3
- Release: September 1999 – September 2002

Suzy's World is a New Zealand educational children's television programme presented by Suzy Cato which ran from September 1999 to September 2002 aimed at children aged 5–9. It provided scientific information (e.g. electrical circuits) in a way that young children could relate to.
