= Grimmy =

Grimmy may refer to:

- Mother Goose and Grimm, an American comic strip
  - Mother Goose and Grimm (TV series), American animated television series based on the comic strip
- Nick Grimshaw, often known as Grimmy, a British television and radio presenter
- The Grim Reaper, the personification of death
