= Suzy Cato =

New Zealand children's entertainer

Suzy Cato ONZM
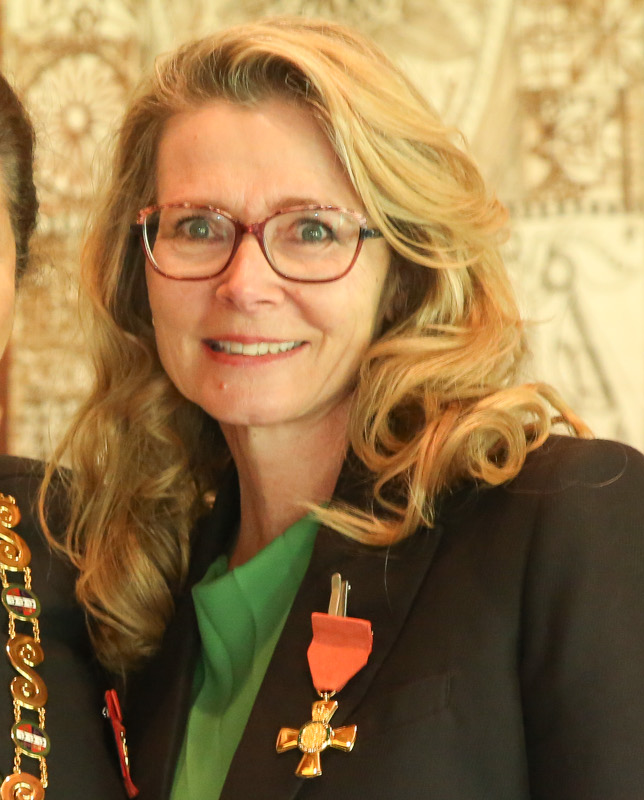
- Cato in 2025
- Born: Suzanne Noreen Cato; 20 June 1968 (age 58); Brisbane, Queensland, Australia
- Occupations: TV personality, producer
- Years active: 1990–present
- Spouse: Steve Booth
- Children: 2

YouTube information
- Channel: Suzy Cato's Treehut TV
- Genre: Vlogs
- Subscribers: 15.6 thousand
- Views: 5 million
- Last updated: August 8, 2025
- Website: suzy.co.nz

Suzanne Noreen Cato ONZM (born 20 June 1968) is a New Zealand children's entertainer. She is best known as the host of several New Zealand children's television programmes, most notably Suzy's World and You and Me.

== Career ==
Cato began her broadcasting career at the KCCFM radio station in Whangarei, before she moved to Auckland to begin her television career in 1990. Cato's first role on television was as a presenter of the New Zealand version of the popular children's television series The Early Bird Show with a puppet character named Russell Rooster. After The Early Bird Show, Cato moved on to hosting the children's television show 3pm.

In 1993 Cato presented the successful You and Me television show, which aired over 2000 episodes. When this show finished in 1998, Cato created her own production company – Treehut. Cato went on to produce her immensely popular Suzy's World, which aired 263 episodes from 1999–2002. In 2025 You and Me was re-released on a new dedicated YouTube channel.

Since 2005, Cato has produced a television show in association with the New Zealand Police – Bryan and Bobby. Bryan and Bobby is an educational show which was created to teach children safety messages through song and entertainment.

Cato was a contestant on the seventh series of Dancing With The Stars New Zealand.

She is currently co-hosting a podcast series Double Strength Mama Power (regarding parenting in New Zealand) alongside Tui Fleming.

She was part of a TV channel designed to educate New Zealand children stuck at home during the COVID-19 pandemic, on one of two channels announced on 8 April 2020.

On 9 May 2021 Suzy appeared on The Masked Singer NZ as the "Tūī", being the first one eliminated.

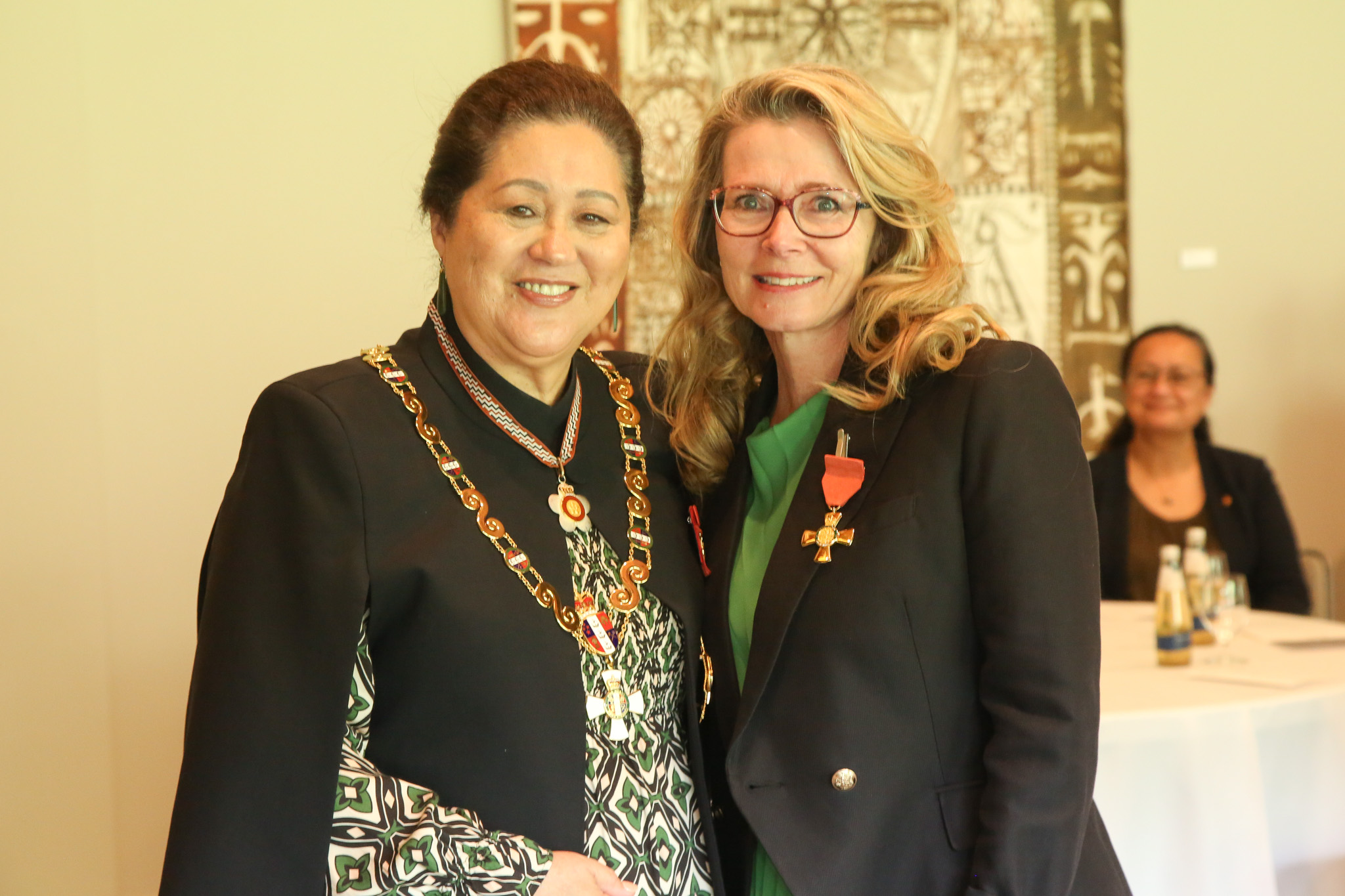
Cato (right), after her investiture as an Officer of the New Zealand Order of Merit by the governor-general, Dame Cindy Kiro, at Government House, Auckland, on 1 October 2025

In the 2025 King’s Birthday Honours, Cato was appointed an Officer of the New Zealand Order of Merit, for services to music, television and education.

== Personal life ==
Born in Brisbane, Queensland, Australia to New Zealander parents, Cato moved to her parents' homeland when she was a month old, living in Hamilton, Kaikohe and Dunedin before settling in Auckland where she lives today.

When Suzy's World was cancelled, Cato said that she was taking a break to focus on "her greatest production ever — growing a wee family".

Cato and her husband Steve have two children.

== See also ==
- List of New Zealand television personalities
