= You and Me (New Zealand TV series) =

- Presented by: Suzy Cato; Pauline Cooper
- Country of origin: New Zealand
- Original language: English
- No. of episodes: 500

Production
- Production location: Dunedin
- Production company: Kids TV Ltd

Original release
- Network: TV3
- Release: 6 July 1992

You and Me is a children's television programme hosted by Australian-born New Zealand entertainer Suzy Cato. The first episode aired in 1992 and more than 2000 episodes were produced in the next seven years.

At the 1995 New Zealand Film and Television Awards, episode 656 of You and Me won the award for best children's programme.

== Production ==
After winning a bidding process from a pool of competing proposals in 1991, TV3 received financial support for the show from NZ On Air. According to the scholar Ruth Zanker, it was "the first indigenous early-childhood production". Zanker found there was a significant increase in new early childhood content in 1992 when You and Me received the grant, a time at which TV2 and TV3 experienced the height of their rivalry for creating content for preschoolers and primary school students. The show's writers and directors were each certified in teaching preschool.

Mary Phillips produced the programme. From July 1992 until September 1993, Pauline Cooper was the presenter. In 1993, Suzy Cato received a phone call inviting her to become the show's presenter which she accepted. Every month, the show's staff spent two weeks in Dunedin producing episodes for the month. The staff had the capacity to produce as many as three episodes per day, five times per week. Every episode follows a closely controlled script. Cato injects "Suzyisms" into the episodes through ad libbing and making jokes. The show required Cato to say expressions in foreign languages and had three songs per episode which motivated Cato to enroll in voice lessons. For each episode, she performed new renditions of the song It's Our Time and the farewell songs. Two episodes were broadcast per day on TV3. By 1999, the show had concluded with Cato, though TV3 still aired reruns.

== Content ==
You and Me uses the interactive television narrative technique. Young viewers are guided to feel that Cato, the presenter, is personally addressing them and to reply to her in kind. The show covers topics that can be challenging for parents such as a bird's and a goldfish's deaths. During one show, Cato illustrates what homophones are. She states that a "duck" has the dual definitions of bird and a movement and discusses "chairs" and "cheers".

An adult who watched the television program was incensed when Cato cited "chairs" and "cheers" as homophones that differ in meaning. He lodged an objection with the broadcaster TV3, stating that the two words have distinct pronunciations and saying otherwise violated guidelines for decency and proportion. In support of Cato, TV3 stated that the audience was informed not that the words had identical pronunciation but that they sounded alike. The complainant escalated his grievance to the Broadcasting Standards Authority (BSA), which ruled in TV3's favour. BSA decided, "Although it hesitates to agree with TV3 that the words were pronounced correctly, the authority concludes the issue is not a matter of broadcasting standards."

== Spinoffs ==
In the late 2000s, the show returned to New Zealand television airing on TVNZ 6 and TVNZ Kidzone 24. Various spin-offs based on You and Me have featured Cato. There was a version made for international release featuring Cato, except with the Maori words removed. An activity book was created for the show. Cable television networks across Australia, Singapore and Namibia broadcast a global edition of the program.

== Works cited ==
- Horrocks, Roger; Perry, Nick, eds. (2004). Television in New Zealand: Programming the Nation. Oxford: Oxford University Press. pp. 32, 157, 162. ISBN 0-19-558447-3 – via Internet Archive.
- Zanker, Ruth (2001). What now?: a New Zealand children's television production case study (PhD thesis). University of Waikato. hdl:10289/14480.
