= William Engesser =

American actor

- Born: William Leroy Engesser Jr. February 21, 1939
- Died: June 20, 2002 (aged 63); Alabama, United States
- Other names: Bill Engesser; Abe Greyhound
- Occupation: Film actor
- Height: 7 ft 3 in (2.21 m)

William Engesser (February 21, 1939 – June 20, 2002) was an American film actor known for his height.

Engesser stood 7 ft 3 in (2.21 m) tall. His roles include Jerry Reed's bodyguard in Gator (1976), Richard/"Bigfoot" in The Secrets of Isis (1975), Krakow the Werewolf in the campy House on Bare Mountain (1962), and a bit part as a man in a gym in The Nutty Professor (1963).

He attended El Monte High School in El Monte, California. In high school, he was a highly scouted basketball recruit and was often linked with Wilt Chamberlain due to his height. Engesser attended the University of Southern California and played for their basketball team, the USC Trojans, and was selected by the New York Knicks as the first pick in the 14th round of the 1961 NBA Draft.
