= 3pm =

- Presented by: Suzy Cato
- Country of origin: New Zealand
- Original language: English

Production
- Executive producer: Rex Simpson
- Producers: Dianne Moffat; John Heighes
- Production company: Kids' TV Ltd

Original release
- Network: TV3
- Release: 3 February 1992 – 1992

3pm is a New Zealand children's show hosted by Suzy Cato. It screened on the independent station TV3 in 1992, and featured an oversized pumpkin, games, interviews, viewers' mail and cartoons. The show was produced by the television company Kids' TV Ltd.

3PM is also an acronym for Product-Project-Portfolio Management, or alternatively Project-Program-Portfolio Management.

== List of programmes ==
=== Cartoons ===
- Dinosaucers
- Disney's Adventures of the Gummi Bears
- DuckTales
- He-Man and the Masters of the Universe
- The New Adventures of Winnie the Pooh
- Speed Racer
- TaleSpin
- Teenage Mutant Ninja Turtles
- The Transformers
- Voltron: Defender of the Universe
- Widget the World Watcher

=== Live-action ===
- Double Dare
