= Ghostbusters (1986 TV series) =

1986 American animated television series

- Title card
- Created by: Marc Richards
- Based on: The Ghost Busters by Marc Richards
- Developed by: Bob Logan; Robby London; Barry O'Brien
- Starring: Pat Fraley; Peter Cullen; Lou Scheimer; Linda Gary; Susan Blu; Alan Oppenheimer; Erika Scheimer
- Country of origin: United States
- No. of seasons: 1
- No. of episodes: 65

Production
- Executive producer: Lou Scheimer
- Running time: 22 minutes
- Production companies: Filmation; Tribune Entertainment

Original release
- Network: First-run syndication
- Release: September 8 – December 5, 1986

Related
- The Ghost Busters

Filmation's Ghostbusters (previously called Ghostbusters) is a 1986 American animated television series created by Filmation and distributed by Tribune Entertainment, serving as the sequel to Filmation's 1975 live-action television show The Ghost Busters.

The show premiered around the same time as the unrelated The Real Ghostbusters, which premiered five days later. When making their film, Columbia Pictures needed to obtain rights to use the name from Filmation.

The success of Columbia's (unrelated) film spurred Filmation to resurrect their own property, producing an animated series based on the characters from the earlier TV show. This animated series ran from September 8 to December 5, 1986 in daytime syndication, and produced 65 episodes. The series is technically called simply Ghostbusters, but home video releases used the name Filmation's Ghostbusters to avoid confusion. In the United States, reruns of the show previously aired on CBN Cable; The Family Channel, Qubo's Qubo Night Owl block from 2010 to 2013; and most recently on the Retro Television Network until 2015.

In the 1980s, ABC aired the series in Australia.

== Summary ==
Jake Kong Jr. and Eddie Spenser Jr. are the sons of the original Ghost Busters from the live-action comedy series of the same name; Tracy the Gorilla had worked with their fathers.

Their headquarters, termed Ghost Command, is located in a haunted mansion nestled between a number of tall skyscrapers (which resemble the World Trade Center's Twin Towers in New York City). They are supported by a number of secondary characters including Ansabone, a talking skull phone; Skelevision, a talking skeleton television; Belfry, a pink talking bat; and Ghost Buggy Jr., their talking car. They occasionally enlist the aid of Futura, a time-traveling Ghostbuster from the future, and Jessica Wray, a local TV news reporter.

Together, they have dedicated themselves to ridding the world of the evil ghost wizard Prime Evil and his cast of henchmen. Prime Evil's headquarters, termed the Hauntquarters (which resembles the British Houses of Parliament complete with a Big Ben-esque clock tower), is located in The Fifth Dimension. In a typical episode, Prime Evil uses his magical powers to open up a wormhole to enable one or more of his henchmen to complete a particular scheme that serves to help him take over the world.

Famous guest-star ghosts and monsters that appeared on the show include Count Dracula and the Headless Horseman (who also appeared in an episode of The Real Ghostbusters written by Jean-Marc Lofficier's wife, Randy Lofficier).

Like almost all 1980s Filmation cartoons, each episode closes with a segment describing a particular lesson that can be learned from the events of the episode. Skelevision (sometimes accompanied by Belfry) is the character most often employed in this role. From time to time, Jake Jr., Eddie Jr. or another protagonist would talk with Skelevision about the lesson.

== Controversy ==
When Columbia Pictures began work on the film Ghostbusters in 1984, producers overlooked the fact that Filmation had already created a live-action comedy series with that same name in 1975. Columbia agreed to license the name from Filmation for $608,000, plus 1% of the profits (of which there were ostensibly none, thanks to Hollywood accounting). This deal did not include giving Filmation the rights to make an animated series based on the film. After the film became a success, Filmation offered to make an animated series, but Columbia chose instead to give the contract to DiC. Filmation then made their own animated show based on their 1975 live-action sitcom. It was released just a few days ahead of DiC's series. DiC titled their own adaptation of the movie The Real Ghostbusters to distinguish it from the Filmation show.

The Filmation show and the DiC show aired simultaneously, and this left audiences confused because they had similar titles and concepts. This confusion led to poor toy sales for the Filmation show. In retrospect, producer Lou Scheimer felt that it had been an error to produce a Ghostbusters show in direct competition to the more popular Columbia show.

== Home media ==
BCI Eclipse LLC (under its Ink & Paint classic animation entertainment label and under license from Entertainment Rights PLC) released the entire series in Region 1 in two-volume sets in 2007. Each episode on BCI Ink & Paint's DVD releases of the 1986 animated series of Filmation's Ghostbusters was uncut, re-mastered and in story continuity order. Each set also features extensive special features including interviews, commentary, image galleries, bonus episodes and more. Unlike many of BCI Ink & Paint's R1 DVD releases of the Filmation in-house library, with the exception of two episodes ("Tracy Come Back", and "Like Father, Like Son"), this DVD release appears to have been sourced from the original NTSC film prints. As of 2009, these releases have been discontinued and are out of print as BCI Eclipse ceased operations.

TGG Direct, LLC released a single-disc The Best of Ghostbusters DVD that contains four episodes ("Mummy Dearest", "Shades of Dracula", "The White Whale" and "Like Father, Like Son"). The disc was available at Wal-Mart on a cardboard backing.

Mill Creek Entertainment announced the re-release of the series on DVD.

DVD name	Ep#	Region 1
Filmation's Ghostbusters – Volume 1	32	February 27, 2007
Filmation's Ghostbusters – Volume 2	33	July 3, 2007

In Australia, the complete series was released on DVD by Shock Entertainment across three 3-disc volumes on June 1, 2016.

The animated series was previously released on VHS by Celebrity Home Entertainment's "Just For Kids" imprint.

== VHS UK history ==
- Video Gems (later Little Gems) (September 1987 – 1993)

VHS video title	VHS Studios	Year of release	Episodes
Ghostbusters – The Ransom of Eddie Spenser / A Friend in Need	Video Gems	1987	"The Ransom of Eddie Spenser" "A Friend in Need"
Ghostbusters – Further Adventures of Your Favorite Ghost Hunters	Video Gems	1988	"The Battle for Ghost Command" "Like Father, Like Son"
Ghostbusters (Little Gems – Junior Video Club)	Little Gems	1991	"The Ransom of Eddie Spenser" "A Friend in Need"
Ghostbusters – Further Adventures of Your Favorite Ghost Hunters (Little Gems – Junior Video Club)	Little Gems	1991	"The Battle for Ghost Command" "Like Father, Like Son"

== Recurring characters ==
=== Heroes ===
- Jake Kong Jr. is the son of the original Jake Kong from The Ghost Busters. Jake is the leader of the Ghostbusters, just like his father was. He is often responsible for coming up with ideas to solve difficult problems. Action is what Jake lives for, and he takes ghostbusting very seriously. His nose twitches when ghosts are nearby. Jake is of Swedish heritage on his father's side of the family. Voiced by Pat Fraley.
- Eddie Spenser Jr. is the son of the original Eddie Spenser from The Ghost Busters. Eddie is often frightened by ghosts, though he always means well. He is klutzy, but what he lacks in wits and resourcefulness he compensates for in enthusiasm. Voiced by Peter Cullen.
- Tracy the Gorilla is the same ape from The Ghost Busters. Extremely smart, Tracy is credited with supplying the various ghost-busting gadgets which Jake and Eddie use; he will often produce one on the fly, if needed. Tracy's as strong as he is clever, which also helps in the crunch. Unlike the live-action series, in which he usually wore a beanie, Tracy wears a fedora with a backpack and khaki shorts. Voiced by Lou Scheimer.
- Belfry is a pink-colored bat who can emit a sonic scream. Belfry calls it the Belfry Blast. Belfry will sometimes tag along on Ghostbusting adventures, but often is told it could be too dangerous. Belfry has three cousins: a Southern bat named Beauregard, a Brooklyn bat named Rafter, and a British bat named Yves. His name and species are a reference to the expression "bats in one's belfry". Voiced by Susan Blu.
- Futura is a ghostbusting sorceress from the 30th century who uses technology instead of magic. She is as intelligent and brave as she is lovely. Her vehicle of choice is the Time Hopper, a futuristic motorcycle. Futura is often called in by her 20th century predecessors whenever a bad situation gets worse. She can predict what is going to happen in the present time, as well as being telekinetic. She also seems to have a crush on Jake; often complimenting him on how he looks and periodically kissing him, much to his delight. In her original design, Futura was an African American with long, light-brown hair. Voiced by Susan Blu.
- Jessica Wray is a TV news reporter. She often reports on the events the Ghostbusters will go investigate and sometimes accompanies them. Jake seems to have a crush on her and she for him. She had blonde hair in her initial design. Voiced by Susan Blu.
- Madam Why is a fortune-telling Roma woman who speaks with a European accent, resides in a wagon, and occasionally assists the Ghostbusters. Voiced by Linda Gary.
- Ghost Buggy Jr., a.k.a. G.B. is the Ghostbusters' Southern accent-talking car that can assume many forms of transportation (including a train complete with graffiti on the sides), along with the ability to travel through time. Ghost Buggy Jr. is often found sleeping in Ghost Command's garage and gets annoyed when the Ghostbusters land on him. His face is the ghost shown in the series logo. Voiced by Pat Fraley.
- Corky is Jessica's young nephew. He wears an orange shirt with the Ghostbusters logo on it. Voiced by Erika Scheimer.
- Ansabone is Ghost Command's talking skull telephone. When the Ghostbusters get a call for help, Ansabone will usually make it hard for them to answer him and will give the caller a sarcastic message. Voiced by Lou Scheimer.
- Skelevision is Ghost Command's talking skeleton television. Skelevision often shows the Ghostbusters the problem they will have to face and is very often the one who talks about the lesson that can be learned from the episode. Voiced by Lou Scheimer.
- Skelevator is Ghost Command's bony elevator with a mind of its own. It is the primary transport for the Ghostbusters to change into their ghost-busting attire. A portable version is used when the Ghostbusters are on location while tracking ghosts. Voiced by Erika Scheimer.
- Shock Clock is Ghost Command's talking cuckoo clock. Voiced by Erika Scheimer.
- Merlin is the famed wizard of King Arthur's era, who has previously crossed paths with Prime Evil. Voiced by Alan Oppenheimer.
- Fuddy is Merlin's apprentice. When a full moon is out, Jake is able to chant and call him for help by casting a magic spell, which rarely works the way it is intended. Voiced by Lou Scheimer.
- Jake Kong Sr. and Eddie Spenser Sr. are Jake and Eddie's fathers, the original Ghostbusters, who occasionally appear in animated form as well. They are voiced by the same actors that do the voices of Jake (voiced by Pat Fraley) and Eddie (voiced by Peter Cullen), respectively.
- Skelescope is Ghost Command's talking telescope. Voiced by Pat Fraley.
- Ghost Buggy Sr. is the car of the original Ghostbusters and GB's father.
- Time Hopper is Futura's hover scooter. GB has a crush on her, but she does not feel the same way. Voiced by Susan Blu.
- Foxfire is a super-fast-running male fox who resides with Madam Why.

=== Villains ===
- Prime Evil: The primary villain, Prime Evil is a ghost sorcerer garbed in flowing red robes, although he also sports cybernetic components such as an android-like human skull. His name is a pun of the word "primeval". Prime Evil has many evil powers, including the ability to shoot energy bolts from his fingers. Prime Evil's minions often find themselves getting zapped when they do not succeed in stopping the Ghostbusters. He encounters the Ghostbusters in the first episode; however, they outsmarted him and imprisoned him for 100 years, until he escaped. He went back in time to get his revenge. Prime Evil has a hard time saying "Ghostbusters" and will often refer to them as "Ghost Blisters", "Ghost Buzzards", "Ghost Brats", "Ghost Bozos", "Ghost Busting Goons", "Ghost Bunglers", etc. Voiced by Alan Oppenheimer.

==== Main ====
- Brat-A-Rat: This pot-bellied, legless flying rat has an elongated nose and a lizard-like body, with an acute squint in one eye. He has no wings, but levitates. He serves as Prime Evil's right-hand and tattletale. His name is loosely based on Burt Bacharach. An accomplished keyboard-player, Brat-A-Rat is disliked by Prime Evil's followers as much as Belfry is loved by the Ghostbusters. Voiced by Peter Cullen.
- Scared Stiff: A robotic skeleton. He is easily frightened and is often zapped to pieces by Prime Evil or falls apart on account of his own fear. He was originally stockier in his pilot appearance. Voiced by Pat Fraley.
- Fangster: A werewolf from the future who wears high-top gym shoes. Voiced by Alan Oppenheimer.
- The Haunter: "Civilized Hunter of Haunted Prey". He resembles a safari hunter with an English accent. His vocal nuance exaggerates the letter "r" for the letter "w", such as pronouncing "Dematerializer" as "Dematewealwizer." He often gets in trouble for calling Prime Evil "old boy", "old bean" and other English endearments. According to the DVD guidebook, the Haunter's speech, mannerisms, and appearance are based on actor Terry-Thomas. He will sometimes make his pith helmet extremely large to fly in or to assist in kidnapping people. His magic monocle has the power to turn people mean. He is possibly Prime Evil's most loyal minion, as he never sided with Big Evil, believing such a thing was bad business. Voiced by Peter Cullen.
- Mysteria: "Mistress of Mists". She wears a long black hairstyle. She has power over mist and is known for calling people "darling". She is also known for her extreme vanity. She originally had a human appearance and a long red dress. Voiced by Linda Gary.
- Sir Trance-A-Lot: "A Bad Knight to One and All". A skeleton knight with a Dalí-esque moustache who also rides a skeletal horse named Frightmare, and wields the Trance Lance that fires beams that induce sleep. His name is a reference to Sir Lancelot. Voiced by Lou Scheimer.
- Apparitia: "Spirit Sorceress Supreme". A vampish sorceress. Like her name implies, she can conjure up all sorts of apparitions. She wears a sleeveless red dress with long green hair, thus giving her a similar look to Eris, the Greek goddess of discord. Voiced by Linda Gary.
- Captain Long John Scarechrome: A pirate ghost bearing a hook and metal peg leg. His name is a reference to Long John Silver. Voiced by Alan Oppenheimer.

==== Secondary ====
- Airhead: A fat mummy ghost who is nothing but bandages. Airhead lives up to his name, as he is not very smart. He often makes really bad jokes which amuse only himself. Voiced by Alan Oppenheimer.
- Floatzart: "Musical Maestro of Fright". A petite, red-haired tuxedo-wearing ghost with music-themed powers; loosely based on Wolfgang Amadeus Mozart, but looks like Ludwig van Beethoven. Voiced by Peter Cullen.
- Fib Face: A two-faced villain who is incapable of telling the truth. Like Prime Evil, he is immune to Jake's Dematerialization gun; the only way to send him to limbo is to make his faces argue with each other. Voiced by Lou Scheimer.
- Dr. Creep: A skeletal scientist who betrays Prime Evil for Big Evil.

==== Other ====
- The Tooth Scaries: Three small ghosts named Big Tooth, Sweet Tooth, and Cavity. A fourth one, a girl named Flossy, appeared later. Her guitar has the power to put anyone to sleep. They have the power to eat anything, due to their sharp teeth. They eventually become good.
- Big Evil: Prime Evil's overweight rival, with four arms and pointed ears. He is so powerful that he forced Prime Evil to team up with the Ghostbusters to defeat him, much to Prime Evil's dismay. Voiced by Peter Cullen.
- Corpulon: A ghost from the future with a grudge against Futura, who sent him to limbo. He requires massive amounts of energy to stay "alive"—in fact, he eats it out of enormous jars. He uses "Bug-Droids" to do his dirty work. Remarkably, Corpulon is one of the few ghosts in the series who is not associated with Prime Evil. Voiced by Peter Cullen.

== Weapons ==
Note: only the Dematerializer was carried over from the live-action series. All other weapons shown here are specific to this series.

- The Dematerializer: The Ghostbusters' main weapon, it shoots a beam that banishes ghosts to limbo, but does not always work (Prime Evil, for example, is too powerful to be affected, and while it works on Fangster, a werewolf, and Scared Stiff, a robot, it does not work on vampires (like Count Dracula) or on a "voodoo monster" named Voodon (seen in "The Bind That Ties")). It tends to get broken, preventing the Ghostbusters from achieving easy victory.
- The Ghost Gummer: Shoots a gob of a sticky pink substance to immobilize enemies.
- The Spectre Snare: Shoots a coiled rope to trap a ghost.
- The Bubble Blaster: Fires off a stream of soap-like bubbles that combine to form one large bubble to entrap a ghost.
- The Dematerializer Net: An energized net that is stretched across the Ghost Buggy that causes ghosts to be banished to limbo as soon as they touch it.
- The Ghost Packs: The standard equipment packs Jake and Eddie carry with their Ghostbusters logo on it. They hold a number of devices within them and also act as jet packs when needed. Tracy carries a larger version, which includes the portable Transformation Chamber itself. The Ghost Packs replace the single "satchel" from the live-action series.
- The Transformation Chamber: A skeletal elevator normally located at Ghostbusters HQ, which Jake and Eddie use to change into their uniforms and equip themselves with their Ghost Packs. After a cry of "Let's go, Ghostbusters!", the elevator rises up into some kind of ghostly dimension where they are stripped down to their underwear and prepared for battle. Their 'transformation sequence' is a series of acrobatic movements along a kind of assembly line, with trapezes, a slide, and bouncing off an old mattress to land into Ghost Buggy Jr. In the majority of the episodes, viewers see part or all of this process.
- The Ghost Post: A weapon owned by the original Ghostbusters. Its functions are unknown, as it was just about to be used.
- The Fright Freezer: A weapon mounted to the side of Ghost Buggy Jr. that can freeze ghosts instantly.
- The Micro Dematerializer: All the abilities of the regular-sized Dematerializer packed into a flashlight-sized "phaser"-type weapon.
- The Ecto-Strobe: A device that, when flashed intermittently, could detect recent ghost and supernatural activity. It could also be used to temporarily stun or blind ghosts. This often made cases a bit too easy.
- The Ghost Gobbler: A handheld portable 'phaser'-like weapon that would fire a containment field or force field and trap a ghost inside the energy beam; with a rotation of the device the ghost could be shrunk down to a much smaller size and effectively captured or dealt with. Jake describes it is an 'Ecto-Plasmic holographic laser perimeter', while Eddie called it the Ghost Gobbler. Debuted in the episode "Going Ape" alongside the Ecto-Strobe.

== Episodes ==
No.	Title	Directed by	Written by	Original release date
1	"I'll Be a Son of a Ghostbuster"	Tom Tataranowicz	Robby London	8 September 1986
After Prime Evil escapes from his prison and kidnaps their fathers, the Ghost Busters learn of an ancient stone tablet that has clues of their fathers' whereabouts; it takes them to Camelot. But Prime Evil learns of this and sends Sir Trance-A-Lot and Frightmare to stop them.
2	"Frights of the Roundtable"	Ernie Schmidt	Robby London	9 September 1986
The Ghost Busters arrive at Ghost Command in the future and find a broken piece of the stone tablet, which holds a clue to where their fathers are being held hostage. Prime Evil finds out and sends Long John Scarechrome with a zombie bomb to turn them into mind-controlled zombies. After narrowly escaping him, the Ghost Busters go back to their time to study the tablet and find out that it was broken into pieces and scattered across different points in history. They arrive at Stonehenge to retrieve the second piece of the tablet and battle Sir Trance-A-Lot, who flees to medieval England with the Ghost Busters hot on his trail.
3	"No Pharaoh at All"	Tom Sito	Robby London; Rowby Goren	10 September 1986
The Ghost Busters go into Sir Trance-A-Lot's haunted castle in medieval England to obtain the piece of the tablet that he took from Stonehenge. After defeating him and his pet dragon Sparky, the Ghost Busters head for ancient Egypt and battle Airhead and Apparitia.
4	"The Secret of Mastodon Valley"	Bill Nunes	Rowby Goren; Robby London	11 September 1986
After rescuing Tracy from Apparitia's trap, the Ghost Busters find Eddie, who is being worshipped as a pharaoh in a case of mistaken identity. They retrieve the third tablet piece and head for Mastodon Valley, which exists at the beginning of time. While there, they encounter ghosts of dinosaurs and the Missing Link, who rules Mastodon Valley with an iron fist.
5	"The Ones Who Saved the Future"	Lou Kachivas	Rowby Goren; Robby London	12 September 1986
After the Ghost Busters escape the clutches of the Missing Link, Prime Evil gets fed up with his previous defeats at their hands and teleports the Hauntquarters to Mastodon Valley in an attempt to defeat them himself. The Ghost Busters get kidnapped and taken to the Hauntquarters. Jake escapes the prison cell he and his friends are being held in and finds the last piece of the tablet in Prime Evil's possession. After Jake switches around the control tusks on the Bonetroller to send everyone to Futura's time, the Ghost Busters head to where their fathers are being held captive, which is the mine that Prime Evil was once trapped in. Prime Evil tries to stop them and gets locked in the mine's vault again after Jake tricks him.
6	"Witch's Stew"	Rich Trueblood	Don Heckman	15 September 1986
Prime Evil teams up with the Witch of Salem's ghost to distract the Ghost Busters long enough to steal their dematerializer. When Futura goes to the present to aid them, Prime Evil sends her to 1692—the year of the Salem witch trials.
7	"Mummy Dearest"	Ernie Schmidt	Bob Forward	16 September 1986
Prime Evil sends Airhead to scare away oil workers so that various transportations will come to a halt.
8	"Wacky Wax Museum"	Marsh Lamore	Rowby Goren	17 September 1986
A sculptor at a wax museum creates statues of the Ghostbusters to honor them for their heroism and invites them to her presentation that is occurring the next day. Prime Evil becomes jealous and thinks that if he cannot have a statue, the heroes should not either.
9	"Statue of Liberty"	Tom Sito	Story by : Candace Howerton; Teleplay by : Candace Howerton and J. Larry Carroll	18 September 1986
When the Ghost Busters go to Liberty Island to celebrate the naturalization of Jake's grandfather as a U.S. citizen, Prime Evil steals the Statue of Liberty and replaces it with a symbol of fear made in his likeness.
10	"The Ransom of Eddie Spenser"	Ed Friedman	Bob Forward	19 September 1986
Prime Evil kidnaps Eddie and ends up regretting it due to Eddie's constant clumsy antics.
11	"Eddie Takes Charge"	Tom Sito	Michael Utvich	22 September 1986
When Jake meets Jessica for an evening dinner, he leaves Eddie in charge of Ghost Command. Prime Evil sets a trap by luring Eddie and Tracy to the small town of Goldmine with a fake distress call.
12	"The Great Ghost Gorilla"	Ed Friedman	Don Heckman	23 September 1986
Tracy gets kidnapped by a pair of robots in a flying saucer and taken to the planet Gorillium. He is led to the throne room of Mighty Tong, an ape emperor ghost who intends to use Tracy's body measurements as a model to create an army of super ghost gorillas.
13	"A Friend in Need"	Ed Friedman	Brooks Wachtel; Tom Bagen	24 September 1986
Big Evil takes over the Hauntquarters and Prime Evil holds the entire city hostage to force the Ghost Busters to help him reclaim his home.
14	"No Mo' Snow"	Rich Trueblood	Bob Forward	25 September 1986
Prime Evil uses a ghost dragon to melt Earth's ice caps at the North Pole and cause global flooding.
15	"Prime Evil's Good Deed"	Tom Sito	J. Larry Carroll	26 September 1986
Big Evil zaps Prime Evil with an arcane spell that curses him to fade away into nothingness. The only way for Prime Evil to break the spell and ensure his own survival is for him to perform a genuine, heartfelt good deed.
16	"Cyman's Revenge"	Bill Nunes	J. Larry Carroll	29 September 1986
In the 30th century, evil cyborg Cyman attacks the starship Crusader by shrinking his ghost minion Specter and sending her to wreak havoc inside the ship's computer. The Ghost Busters time travel to the future to save Futura and her brother, who are currently on board.
17	"The Headless Horseman Caper"	Tom Tataranowicz	J. Larry Carroll	30 September 1986
The Headless Horseman betrays Prime Evil to warn the Ghost Busters about an ancient Aztec medallion that would make Prime Evil the most powerful force on Earth if he got his hands on it.
18	"Banish That Banshee"	Bill Reed	John Vornholt	1 October 1986
The Wailing Banshee arrives in the present day from 13th-century Ireland to destroy all of Earth's telephone poles. The Ghost Busters travel back in time to find a leprechaun, the only thing capable of defeating her and sending her back to the past.
19	"Rollerghoster"	Bill Reed	Len Riley	2 October 1986
Prime Evil sends Apparitia and Brat-A-Rat to haunt the newly opened Ghost Park to ensure that people will be afraid of ghosts instead of using their images for fun and amusement.
20	"He Went Brataway"	Lou Kachivas	Robby London	3 October 1986
Brat-A-Rat develops a romantic relationship with his next-door neighbor Bratarina, a woman who is the same creature as him. In an effort to win her love, he invades Buckingham Palace and uses Floatzart to summon an army of ghosts to capture Big Ben.
21	"The Looking-Glass Warrior"	Tom Tataranowicz	Bob Forward	6 October 1986
Jessica and her uncle are captured by robots from a world accessible only by mirrors.
22	"Laser and Future Rock"	Ed Friedman	Don Heckman	7 October 1986
Futura's nephew, who leads a rock band, wants to perform on a planet which is believed to have a lot of fans. Futura, however, sees the planet as hostile.
23	"Runaway Choo Choo"	Tom Sito	Candace Howerton	8 October 1986
Prime Evil plans to kidnap Dr. Miller, the most recent winner of the global peace prize, while he is on a train to Oslo, Norway. He sends Apparitia and Scared Stiff to make sure that Miller's train never reaches its destination.
24	"Dynamite Dinosaurs"	Marsh Lamore	Rowby Goren	9 October 1986
Prime Evil sets his sights on a recently discovered dinosaur egg that is about to hatch. He sends Misteria back in time to fetch more dinosaurs for his army, with which he plans to rule the world.
25	"Ghostbunglers"	Ed Friedman	Len Riley	10 October 1986
Prime Evil works with Marcus Phantomus, a Roman gladiator ghost in 49 B.C., to steal Julius Caesar's wreath, a sacred artifact that has been in Madame Why's family for many generations. With the wreath's power, Prime Evil could control the past, present, and future.
26	"My Present to the Future"	Tom Tataranowicz	Bob Forward	13 October 1986
Cope, a boy who has a passion for astronomy, is terrified when he sees Fangster in his telescope. The Ghost Busters travel to the year 2960 to ask Futura why Prime Evil would be interested in scaring him.
27	"The Beastly Buggy"	Ed Friedman	Don Heckman	14 October 1986
Jake enters a cross-country charity race to raise money for a school for the blind. Prime Evil decides to enter the race with the Beastly Buggy (and its driver Hot Rod) to defeat Ghost Buggy once and for all.
28	"Belfry Leads the Way"	Tom Tataranowicz	Arthur Browne Jr.	15 October 1986
Prime Evil learns that the rumors he has heard about a race of mole people living underground are true. He plans to conquer them and subsequently rule the world from beneath the surface. The Ghost Busters head to the mole people's cave entrance at the North Pole and bring Belfry with them due to his cave expertise.
29	"The Battle for Ghost Command"	Bill Nunes	Bob Forward	16 October 1986
A shady businessman dumps strange chemicals into the sewers as a way to discard them. The fumes from the dumped chemicals cause monsters and animated objects to become aggressive.
30	"Going Ape"	Tom Sito	Durnford King	17 October 1986
Prime Evil's cousin, Count de la Grumpette, makes a clone of Tracy to frame the Ghostbusters for theft.
31	"The Haunting of Gizmo"	Ernie Schmidt	J. Larry Carroll	20 October 1986
Prime Evil captures Futura's brother and reprograms his robots to destroy Ghost Command.
32	"Ghostnappers"	Tom Sito	Len Riley	21 October 1986
Prime Evil kidnaps Madame Why to lure the Ghost Busters into Hauntquarters and brainwash them into his loyal servants.
33	"Inside Out"	Tom Tataranowicz	Bob Forward	22 October 1986
The Ghostbusters travel to the center of the Earth to battle Prime Evil and an army of rock soldiers before they can make an attack on Washington, D.C. from underground using a futuristic laser beam.
34	"The Sleeping Dragon"	Tom Tataranowicz	Durnford King	23 October 1986
Haunter steals a gem from a dragon statue in China. This causes the statue to come to life and wreak havoc. To gain the dragon's trust and help in reclaiming the gem, Futura, Jessica, and Tracy must pass a series of tests for strength, speed, and skill.
35	"The Phantom of the Big Apple"	Ernie Schmidt	Don Heckman	24 October 1986
Ghosts are swarming around New York City and a mysterious specter known as "The Phantom of the Big Apple" is responsible. He invites Jessica to his office and gives her an ultimatum: he will explain how he is scaring everyone out of their wits right before he forces the entire city to surrender.
36	"Shades of Dracula"	Bill Nunes	Story by : Fred Ladd; Teleplay by : Fred Ladd and Bob Forward	27 October 1986
Count Dracula returns to Transylvania after a long absence to kidnap the duchess and her chauffeur and reclaim his kingdom.
37	"Outlaw In-Laws"	Tom Sito	Bob Forward	28 October 1986
Prime Evil kidnaps Belfry to amplify his "Belfry Blast" and conquer the world. At the same time, Prime Evil's sister (Prime Ordeal) and nephew (Snookums) come for a visit and hamper his plan at every turn.
38	"Our Buddy Fuddy"	Marsh Lamore	Bob Forward	29 October 1986
Prime Evil's henchmen try to capture Merlin, but they capture Fuddy by mistake.
39	"Train to Doom-De-Doom-Doom"	Lou Kachivas	Rowby Goren	30 October 1986
Prince Otis of Petronia contacts the Ghost Busters after hearing a radio transmission from Prime Evil, who plans to steal the royal crown and make Haunter king so he can indulge in Petronian gold. The Ghost Busters have to catch up with Haunter and Misteria before they reach Petronia on the Orient Express.
40	"The Princess and the Troll"	Ed Friedman	Candace Howerton	31 October 1986
Prince Delwyn and Princess Gwendolyn of Fairy Tale Land are about to be married. The wedding is interrupted by a teleporting sorcerer who transforms the prince into a troll and intends to seize the kingdom for himself.
41	"Second Chance"	Marsh Lamore	Don Heckman	3 November 1986
The Tooth Scaries are ordered by Prime Evil to steal the Diamond of the Nile from a museum. Big Tooth, Little Tooth, and Cavity are interested, but Flossy has her doubts. Can the Ghost Busters give a second chance to ghosts that were easily misled and never really evil to begin with?
42	"Tracy Come Back"	Rich Trueblood	Don Heckman	4 November 1986
Prime Evil captures Tracy and tries to alter the memories of the gorilla in order to corrupt him.
43	"Doggone Werewolf"	Lou Kachivas	Robby London	5 November 1986
Fangster finds a magic bone that can turn dogs into werewolves.
44	"That's No Alien"	Ernie Schmidt	Mark Nasatir; Charles Kaufman	6 November 1986
Prime Evil pretends to be an alien to deceive the future Earthlings.
45	"Scareplane"	Marsh Lamore	Len Riley	7 November 1986
Prime Evil steals an experimental space plane from Galaxy Airlines. The company president contacts the Ghost Busters to get it back before it can be used as a weapon.
46	"The Ghost of Don Quixote"	Bill Reed	Bob Forward	10 November 1986
After a trio of thugs break into a family's home, the ghost of Don Quixote emerges from a children's book to scare off the raiders. The father goes to his businessman friend Enrique for protection. Enrique decides to get rid of Don Quixote to get access to the copper mine buried underneath the family's land.
47	"The White Whale"	Bill Reed	Bob Forward	11 November 1986
A pirate ship attacks a phantom prison planet in search of the ghost of Moby Dick. The pirates kidnap Captain Ahab's ghost, who is now friends with the beast, to force Moby Dick to work for them and plunder every space liner in the galaxy.
48	"Country Cousin"	Rich Trueblood	Len Riley	12 November 1986
Mr. Squid wants to join Prime Evil's minions, but he is easily turned down. He goes on to try to capture the Ghostbusters on his own in an attempt to prove his worth.
49	"Knight of Terror"	Rich Trueblood	Bob Forward	13 November 1986
Corky's friend Gene unwittingly hacks into Prime Evil's super-computer. The friend gets captured by the Knight of Terror as a result.
50	"The Girl Who Cried Vampire"	Bill Reed	Steven J. Fisher	14 November 1986
Prime Evil sends 2 vampires to Moon Base Alpha in the year 2186 to destroy a food source that will eliminate world hunger on Earth. When a girl known for lying out of boredom sees the vampires change into human disguises, nobody believes her...except Eddie. Together, they must thwart the vampires' plan and save the entire moon base.
51	"Little Big Bat"	Lou Kachivas	J. Larry Carroll	17 November 1986
Belfry is frustrated at not being allowed to go on ghost busting missions most of the time. When he blames himself for being too small and wishes he was bigger than the Ghost Busters, a goblin spying on Ghost Command overhears him outside the window. After the goblin reports back to Hauntquarters, Prime Evil disguises himself as "Monroe the Mad Magician" and proceeds to grant Belfry his greatest wish with an amulet that shrinks the Ghost Busters to a size small enough to fit into a mason jar.
52	"Really Roughing It"	Bill Reed	Rowby Goren	18 November 1986
The Ghostbusters and Corky go to the country for a little trip. While the Ghostbusters settle down in a meadow, Corky spots and explores an abandoned shack. He stumbles across Benny and Clyde, two ghosts who have recently stolen a goblin statue and are waiting to deliver it to Prime Evil.
53	"The Bad Old Days"	Marsh Lamore	Dennis O'Flaherty	19 November 1986
Prime Evil's new machine turns back time to millennia ago when Babylonians roamed the Earth.
54	"The Curse of the Diamond of Gloom"	Marsh Lamore	George Atkins	20 November 1986
Haunter steals the Diamond of Gloom from its temple. Unless the Ghost Busters can return the Diamond to its rightful place before the full moon rises, everyone on Earth will be cursed and turn to stone.
55	"The Bind That Ties"	Ed Friedman	Bob Forward	21 November 1986
A rock monster named Voodon terrorizes construction workers that he thinks are destroying his jungle home. When Eddie accidentally handcuffs himself to Voodon, both of them have to work together and save Voodon's jungle home.
56	"Like Father, Like Son"	Lou Kachivas	Durnford King	24 November 1986
Sir Trance-A-Lot heads back to the past and captures Jake's great-grandfather. Prime Evil then turns the great-grandfather into a werewolf, which slowly starts to affect the man's descendants.
57	"The Fourth Ghostbuster"	Ernie Schmidt	Don Heckman	25 November 1986
After passing a ghost ID test at Ghost Command, Corky lies to his friend and brags that he has become the fourth Ghost Buster to impress him. Both of them steal Ghost Buggy to do some ghost busting of their own. After they end up at Hauntquarters and go inside, Ghost Buggy returns to Ghost Command to get help and save them.
58	"Whither Why"	Lou Kachivas	Bob Forward	26 November 1986
The sorcerer Wormroot seeks to add Madame Why's mystical powers to his own and become unstoppable. After Why gets kidnapped by Wormroot's pet snake Cottonmouth, the bats that live in her wagon call the Ghost Busters for help.
59	"Cold Winter's Night"	Ed Friedman	Bob Forward	27 November 1986
Prime Evil diverts a meteorite to land in the South Pole and cause a volcano to erupt. The eruption pushes the Earth away from the Sun.
60	"Father Knows Beast"	Bill Nunes	Earl Kress	28 November 1986
Two kids in a Scottish castle stumble across a magical urn hidden behind one of the bricks in the walls. They accidentally release Slork, king of the trolls, who has been imprisoned inside the urn for 40 years. He seeks to rebuild his army and get revenge on the Ghost Busters who sealed him away.
61	"Back to the Past"	Marsh Lamore	Tony Marino	1 December 1986
A witch turns the Ghost Busters into five-year-old kids so that they will not be strong enough to fight back against Prime Evil and his minions during their Halloween haunt.
62	"Pretend Friends"	Bill Reed	Martha Moran	2 December 1986
Prime Evil orders Long John Scarechrome and Apparitia to steal Dr. Ricer's submarine and dig for a government decoding box at the bottom of the ocean. When Apparitia and Scarechrome arrive at Ricer's house, which is close to where the sub is docked, Apparitia turns his daughter's imaginary friends into ghosts to prevent her from calling for help. After she escapes, Ricer's daughter stows away on the sub to try and prevent it from falling into the wrong hands.
63	"The Haunted Painting"	Marsh Lamore	J. Larry Carroll	3 December 1986
Eddie receives some magical painting equipment from Prime Evil and paints a picture with it. The picture he paints is a virtual world that can trap anyone who enters it.
64	"Maze Caves"	Ed Friedman	Alan J. Adler	4 December 1986
Prime Evil tricks the Ghostbusters into thinking there is treasure on Planet Doom. Eddie, who is desperate to get Jake something for his birthday, goes there with Tracy and Ghost Buggy in search of the perfect gift.
65	"The Way You Are"	Rich Trueblood	J. Larry Carroll	5 December 1986
Eddie bungles an attempt to dematerialize Fib Face and Apparitia, which forces Jake to step in and save him. When Count Freeze sets a trap at Castle Blackstone, Eddie (none the wiser) decides to redeem himself and prove his worth by going in alone. When his friends find out and try to save Eddie, they get captured and frozen inside giant ice blocks. To save Jake, Tracy, and Jessica, Eddie must find the fabled wizard of Blackstone and call upon his power.

== Production notes ==
Ghostbusters was no exception of Filmation's budget-trimming methods, using among others, an extensive sequence where they got their equipment and the Ghost Buggy. In the episode "The Girl Who Cried Vampire", Filmation reused the model sheets and character designs of Drac and Bella La Ghostly from the Groovie Goolies as Victor and Vampra. Drac's clumsy bat transformation sequence, banging against the floor and ceiling, changing clumsily from vampire to bat was reused in this episode and in several others. In the episode "The Way You Are", Super Spenser makes a reference to He-Man from He-Man and the Masters of the Universe when he punches the door.

== Comic book ==
The Ghost Busters are menaced by a Tyrannosaurus. From Filmation's Ghostbusters #2 (1987) from First Comics

First Comics published a comic-book miniseries in 1987 based on the show. Originally intended as a six-issue series, only four issues were published. The unpublished issues (along with reprints of the First Comics series) were published in a six-issue set in Germany by Bastei Verlag in 1988. In the UK, numerous issues were reprinted in a hardcover annual called Filmation's Ghostbusters Annual 1987 by World Color Press.
