= Scheimer =

Scheimer is a surname. Notable people with the surname include:

- Erika Scheimer (born 1960), American voice actress
- Lou Scheimer (1928–2013), American producer
