= A Snow White Christmas =

- VHS cover art
- Written by: Marc Richards
- Directed by: Kay Wright
- Voices of: Melendy Britt; Erika Scheimer; Diane Pershing; Charlie Dell; Larry D. Mann
- Music by: Dean Andre; Ray Ellis; Norm Prescott
- Country of origin: United States
- Original language: English

Production
- Producers: Lou Scheimer; Norm Prescott; Don Christensen
- Cinematography: R.W. Pope
- Editor: Joe Gall
- Running time: 60 minutes
- Production company: Filmation

Original release
- Network: CBS
- Release: December 19, 1980

A Snow White Christmas is a Christmas animated television special produced by Filmation and telecast December 19, 1980, on CBS. The special is a sequel to the fairy tale "Snow White", unrelated to Filmation's other sequel to "Snow White" titled Happily Ever After (1989), which ignores everything from this film.

The film's plot revolves around the return of the Wicked Queen, who is unexpectedly brought back to life during Christmas and casts an evil spell that freezes the entire land. Only the young Snow White, the daughter of the original Snow White, manages to escape and take refuge with seven friendly giants with her dwarf friend, but the Queen keeps trying to get rid of Snow White and her protectors. It is up to the giants to defeat her forever and save the kingdom.

== Plot ==
After vanquishing the Wicked Queen, Queen Snow White and her husband King Charming are now the rulers of the land of Noel. They have a teenage daughter, also named Snow White for her snow-white hair. The royal family decides to host a Christmas Eve winter sports festival. One of the participants is Grunyon, a bumbling dwarf and a friend of the young Snow White. Princess Snow White says her Christmas wish is to build a playhouse for all the children and suggests remodeling the deserted castle on a mountaintop nearby that used to belong to the original Snow White's evil witch stepmother, the Wicked Queen, who has mysteriously disappeared when she was defeated.

Unknown to all, the Wicked Queen had been standing frozen near her abandoned castle all that time, and right then she is freed when it happens that the large block of ice in which she was trapped melts. Returning to her castle, the revived Queen finds her Magic Mirror still in place and learns that now are two Snow Whites more beautiful than her. Furious, she conjures a magical ice storm that freezes the entire kingdom but barely misses the second Snow White. The princess is told by her mother to find the Seven Dwarfs immediately before her parents are transformed into ice statues. Grunyon, who was also spared being frozen, leads Snow White into the forest to escape the storm. After finding their way into the Warm Valley, they accidentally wander upon a giant garden and two giants appear (Finicky and Corny) who mistake them for bugs and try to squash them. Snow White starts crying, and Grunyon scolds the giants who apologize and introduce themselves through song, along with five other giants (Thinker, Hicker, Tiny, Weeper, and Brawny). Turns out they are cousins of the Seven Dwarfs. After hearing their story, they take pity on Snow White and Grunyon, and allow them to stay in their cottage.

After the Wicked Queen discovers the young Snow White is still alive, she first turns herself into a giant rat to eat her, but is foiled when one of the giants shoos her away upon his return home. She then melts all the ice on the mountains to form a flood, but Brawny saves Snow White from drowning. The giants decide to leave Snow White at home and post Hicker as a guard. The Queen turns two vultures into monstrous creatures to distract Hicker, then disguises herself as a giant old woman, supposed sister of the giants, and manages to trick the princess into smelling the scent of a poisoned flower that puts her to sleep, just as she had tricked the first Snow White with the poisoned apple. However, Hicker's hiccups are loud and the other giants hear them and get back to the cottage.

Seeing Snow White apparently dead, they run off to attack the Wicked Queen's castle, seeking revenge. There, she tries to stop them by casting lightning bolts, but Brawny proved to be too tough for that. Next she summons seven demons to fight the giants, but then Hicker begins hiccuping so strongly that he causes an earthquake and the castle collapses. The Magic Mirror, revealed as the source of the Queen's power, is shattered and she evaporates into nothingness. With the Queen's final demise, the curse she has placed over the kingdom is broken, causing the land to thaw and the ice statues to revert to people, just in time for Christmas Eve.

Grunyon and the Giants bring Snow White home to her parents in a rose-filled coffin. They kiss Snow White's cheeks and she awakens, and everyone rejoices. The Wicked Queen's castle has been destroyed, but Brawny also tells that he and the other giants built a new castle for the children while Snow White was asleep.

== Cast ==
- Erika Scheimer as Snow White II
- Melendy Britt as the Wicked Queen
- Charlie Dell as Grunyon
- Larry D. Mann as the Magic Mirror
- Diane Pershing as the original Snow White
- Clinton Sundberg as Thinker
- Arte Johnson as Finicky, Corny, Tiny, Hicker, Weeper, Brawny

== Production ==
It was the first film produced by Lou Scheimer that featured his daughter Erika in the lead role. Filmation wanted to start making sequel to classic stories, and they chose "Snow White" since no one had made a film exploring what happened after the ending, and the format since it was easy to sell a Christmas special at the time.

While this is a sequel to the original fairy tale and not the 1937 Disney film, there are some similarities. One is the portrayal of the Magic Mirror's character, her also portrayed as a drama mask in darkness. In both films, the seven friends include a grim and taciturn individual who, despite seemingly not liking Snow White, ultimately leads the charge against the Queen who has disguised herself as an old woman and whom they chase up a cliff. As in the Disney film, a pair of vultures watch the Queen intently. This is not replicated in the other sequel due to legal issues Filmation suffered from Pinocchio and the Emperor of the Night as the seven Dwarfs are replaced by their female counterparts, the Dwarfelles, and the Queen is killed off and replaced by her evil brother, Lord Maliss, as the main villain.

== Reception ==
Terry Rowan's Having a Wonderful Christmas Time Film Guide gave it three stars out of five.

== See also ==
- A Snow White Christmas (musical)
- Happily Ever After (1989 film)
- List of Christmas films
- The Snow Queen's Revenge
