= Space Academy =

- Genre: Science fiction
- Created by: Allen Ducovny
- Directed by: Various
- Presented by: Filmation
- Starring: Jonathan Harris; Pamelyn Wanda Ferdin; Ric Carrott; Maggie Cooper; Brian Tochi; Ty Henderson; Eric Greene
- Composers: "Yvette Blais" and "Jeff Michael"
- Country of origin: United States
- Original languages: English and dubbed into Spanish for Spanish-speaking television markets. (These dubs are an audio option on the 4-DVD set.)
- No. of seasons: 1
- No. of episodes: 15

Production
- Executive producer: Norm Prescott; Lou Scheimer
- Producer: Arthur H. Nadel
- Cinematography: Aldric Edens, A.S.C.
- Editors: Stanley Frazen, F. Timothy McAvoy
- Camera setup: Single-camera
- Running time: 30 minutes (with commercials)
- Production company: Filmation

Original release
- Network: CBS
- Release: September 10, 1977 – (as reruns) September 1, 1979

Related
- Jason of Star Command

Space Academy is an American science fiction television series produced by Filmation that originally aired Saturday mornings on the CBS television network, from September 10 to December 17, 1977. (Repeats ran on and off until September 1, 1979.) A total of 15 half-hour episodes were made.

== Cast ==
The program starred veteran actor Jonathan Harris, best known as Dr. Zachary Smith of Lost in Space; co-starring were Pamelyn Wanda Ferdin, Ric Carrott, Maggie Cooper, Brian Tochi, Ty Henderson, and Eric Greene. The program featured a pint-sized robot called "Peepo", a radio-controlled machine voiced by Erika Scheimer talking through a pitch-shifter with regenerative delay.

Ferdin and Tochi had been among the child actors who played a group of children orphaned by an evil being masquerading as an angel in the 1968 Star Trek episode And the Children Shall Lead. Greene went on to write the scholarly book Planet of the Apes as American Myth: Race, Politics, and Popular Culture, published in 1996.

Guest stars included Lawrence "Larry" Dobkin; Dena Dietrich ("Mother Nature" in the Chiffon margarine TV commercials of the 1960s and 70s); George DiCenzo; Dallas McKennon; and Howard Morris.

== Concepts and characters ==
Established in the "star year" 3732, the Space Academy, located on an asteroid, brought together the best of young minds, including several with special skills and abilities, to explore the mysteries of space.

- Commander Isaac Gampu (Jonathan Harris) was the head of the academy. His many years of space exploration exposed him to conditions that immensely slowed his aging process; though appearing to be in his sixties or seventies, his true age was well over 300 years old, giving him a unique perspective on history and some ideal qualifications as a teacher. He oversaw the activities of three student exploratory teams, the Red, Blue and Gold Teams (although the main characters were all members of the Blue Team).
- Chris Gentry (Ric Carrott) and Laura Gentry (Pamelyn Ferdin) were the captain and co-captain, respectively, of the academy's Blue Team. The siblings (Chris was the elder) had highly developed telekinetic and other psychic powers. In addition, they two of them could draw on the innate psychic abilities of others to enhance their own powers. Laura was attracted to Matt Prentiss (John Berwick, later "Rex Ruthless" on Hero High), the occasionally-seen leader of the Red Team.
- Adrian Pryce-Jones (Maggie Cooper) was number three in the Blue Team's chain of command and Chris's love interest.
- Paul Jerome (Ty Henderson), a highly intelligent transferee from the Red Team, was raised on an Earth colony. He was number four in the Blue Team's chain of command (although Paul is introduced as an established academy member in the first episode, he is reintroduced in the second episode as if he were a new character; conversely Loki, introduced in the first episode as a new admission, is reintroduced in the second episode as a long-established member. This continuity error was acknowledged in the information booklet accompanying the series' DVD release).
- Tee Gar Soom (Brian Tochi), number five in Blue Team's chain of command, had superhuman physical strength and continued the martial arts traditions of his Asian ancestors. He augmented these abilities with newer disciplines, some of which originated on other planets. His major was medicine, and he was often called on to treat other students who were sick.
- Loki (Eric Greene) was a young orphan discovered in the first episode on the dying world of Zalon. A playful prankster, Loki could teleport and could see well beyond the visible spectrum normally accessible by Earth humans. His frequent catchphrase was "Camelopardus!"
- Peepo (voiced by Erika Scheimer, who spoke the lines through a pitch-shifter with regenerative delay, while John Berwick operated the mechanism and provided an on-set voice for timing/cueing purposes.) was often referred to as a robot, although he himself objected to the label, describing himself as a "self-determining, type A manudroid." His mechanical nature conferred a plethora of special abilities, including the ability to replicate anyone's voice and multilingualism. While actually a construct, he appeared to operate on an emotional level similar to Loki's and the two of them often created mischief together.

As with much of children's television in the 1970s, lessons and morals were taught in each episode. These included wide-ranging concepts, such as that the superpowers possessed by some academy students were not a cure-all for problems, and that even the old and wise could make mistakes. As the students encountered members of extraterrestrial races, even mutated descendants of Earth colonists in space, they came to further develop their wisdom and understanding of diversity throughout the universe.

The spaceships commonly seen in the series were called "Seekers" and were used much like a spacebound van or bus. The Seeker's nose was a re-used prop from the earlier Filmation series Ark II.

One term of jargon unique to the program was "ORACO" ("Orders Received And Carried Out"), used when orders were acknowledged by academy personnel.

== Episodes ==
No.	Title	Directed by	Written by	Original release date
1	"The Survivors of Zalon"	Jeffrey Hayden	Lynn Barker	September 10, 1977
On a planet which will explode in 48 hours, the cadets find a mysterious young boy with strange powers.
2	"Castaways in Time and Space"	Jeffrey Hayden	Samuel A. Peeples	September 17, 1977
Gampu and Laura are on a mission in a Seeker, when they are pulled into a black hole. Chris must use his mind-link with his sister to try to rescue them.
3	"Hide and Seek"	Jeffrey Hayden	Ted Pedersen; Martha Humphreys	September 24, 1977
When a missile is used to destroy an asteroid that threatens the academy, members of the Blue Team begin to disappear. Loki, Laura and Peepo try to save their friends.
4	"Countdown"	George Tyne	Tom Swale	October 1, 1977
The Academy cadets are sent to clean up debris from the Vegan Wars, and an armed mine attaches itself to their shuttle. Then, a Vegan warrior awakens from his cryogenic suspension and is determined to fight the human enemy to the death.
5	"There's No Place Like Home"	George Tyne	Martin Roth	October 8, 1977
An alien named Kane infiltrates Space Academy and tries to get Loki to help him steal a file, promising he will give Loki information about his home planet. But the alien has something sinister in mind and Loki must make a choice.
6	"The Rocks of Janus"	George Tyne	Samuel A. Peeples	October 15, 1977
A pair of comets code-named Janus are on a collision course for the Academy, but when the Blue Team investigates, they discover that the closest comet is actually a sentient being named Irgo. The comet is dying, and came to warn sentient beings about the other comet, a criminal named Targ. Can the Blue Team revive Irgo and defeat Targ?
7	"Monkey Business"	Jeffrey Hayden	Marianne Mosner (story); Jack Paritz (teleplay)	October 22, 1977
Adrian has been training a chimpanzee named Jake to communicate. When the space mirror aimed at Alturos stops rotating. Professor Bolt and Tee Gar may freeze to death unless help comes soon. Chris, Loki and Jake go to the rescue, but are soon in a hot predicament themselves.
8	"The Phantom Planet"	Ezra Stone	Samuel A. Peeples	October 29, 1977
Proteus IX-B, an asteroid that once housed a small mining colony, is about to be demolished. But the appearance of a phantom planet around it leads Blue Team to perform a seance, in which Chris and Laura communicate with a ghostly member of a long-dead civilization, and learn they have to perform a dangerous rescue.
9	"Planet of Fire"	Arthur H. Nadel	Susan Dworski; Peter Packer	November 5, 1977
Tee Gar invents a new device known as the "cryotron", which can instantly freeze things. Against orders, he takes it to the planet Delius to test it further, unaware that the frozen things he tested at the Academy have since exploded. When a giant named Dramon (guest star Don Pedro Colley) gains control over the cryotron and freezes Peepo, the Blue Team may not be able to save their robotic friend.
10	"Life Begins at 300"	Arthur H. Nadel	Jack Paritz	November 12, 1977
Paul's life is endangered and Peepo shuts down when Gampu makes an error in a Zolium-extraction mission. He is now 300 years old; is it time for him to retire? The frustrated Gina Correy thinks so...but who will save the headstrong cadet when she gets herself into danger?
11	"The Cheat"	George Tyne	Robert Specht	November 19, 1977
Despite the fact that he is under investigation for safety violations, Cadet Matt Prentiss is placed in charge of a mission to Asteroid BX-3 to contain a leaking reactor that threatens a nearby colony on Alopek. Blue Team goes with Prentiss - including among them Chris Gentry, who cannot stand the headstrong leader - but Prentiss' actions soon put them all in danger.
12	"My Favorite Marcia"	Jeffrey Hayden	Ted Pedersen; Martha Humphreys	November 26, 1977
A star is going to explode, taking with it the planets around it. But the Academy receives a Galactic Distress Beacon from the Sunbeam, a trading ship run by Marcia Giddings, the past love of Gampu's life. But a rogue robot war machine soon traps Marcia and the Blue Team on the planet.
13	"Space Hooky"	Jeffrey Hayden	Howard Rayfiel and Samuel A. Peeples (story); Samuel A. Peeples (teleplay)	December 3, 1977
Loki skips class, but his body is taken over by two alien children who are balls of energy. The children exit Loki and take over Paul and Gampu, putting the Academy at great risk with their bizarre commands.
14	"Star Legend"	Ezra Stone	Samuel A. Peeples	December 10, 1977
Paul and Chris are trapped in the Alderan Triangle, then pushed back out into normal space by an entity that warns them away. But Gampu leads the others into the Triangle, they find the millennium-old Starship Hope, a near-duplicate of Space Academy. Aboard it is the aged Captain Rampo, and he has a warning...
15	"Johnny Sunseed"	Ezra Stone	Don Heckman	December 17, 1977
Gampu's cantankerous technology-phobic brother visits the Academy. Unfortunately, Sunseed and many Academy crew members are affected by genetically-altered food that Paul has grown on a space farm. The hallucinations and bizarre behavior the food causes results in a deadly situation for Sunseed, unless he can work with Peepo, a being he truly despises.

== Home media ==
BCI Eclipse LLC (under its Ink & Paint classic animation entertainment brand) (under license from Entertainment Rights), released Space Academy: The Complete Series as a 4-disc Region 1 DVD box set on January 16, 2007. The collection presented episodes uncut, remastered and in order of their original airdates, and included special features about the making of the show.

Savor Ediciones, S.A. released Space Academy: La Serie Completa as a 3-disc Region 2 DVD box set on October 28, 2009. Unlike the BCI set, this release only contains the episodes, no bonus features. Being a Region 2 release for Spain, the soundtrack is the dubbed Spanish version. Unfortunately, the original English soundtrack was not included, even as a secondary option. The discs are encoded in the PAL video format, which is the same format as the currently-existing masters, so there is a small amount of additional picture area not present on the NTSC conversions released by BCI Eclipse.

== Spin-off ==
In 1978, a spin-off of Space Academy, Jason of Star Command, debuted. Initially a serialized segment of Tarzan and the Super 7, it starred Craig Littler and James Doohan, with Sid Haig as the villain. Star Command was described as a special section of the Space Academy; the show used the same sets, costumes and special effects as the parent program.

== Merchandise ==
In 1977, Aviva Toy Company manufactured and F.W. Woolworth distributed a set of four eight-and-a-half inch action figures based on Space Academy characters. The dolls in this set included Issac [sic] Gampu (described as "Instructor in 'Space Academy'"), Tee Gar Soom ("Almost Super Human Strength"), Chris Gentry ("Member of Space Academy") and Loki ("Everybody's Mascot").

Also available for the figures were special "adventure outfits", sold separately.
