= Brown Hornet =

Brown Hornet may refer to:

- Brown Hornet, a colloquial term for the European hornet
- The Brown Hornet the cartoon superhero
