= The New Adventures of Mighty Mouse and Heckle & Jeckle =

- Genre: Comedy; Superhero; Slapstick
- Voices of: Alan Oppenheimer; Diane Pershing; Frank Welker; Lou Scheimer; Erika Scheimer; Norm Prescott
- Country of origin: United States
- Original language: English
- No. of seasons: 1
- No. of episodes: 16 (96 segments)

Production
- Executive producers: Norm Prescott; Lou Scheimer
- Producer: Don Christensen
- Running time: 1 hour (shortened to 30 minutes in 1980)
- Production companies: Filmation; Viacom Productions

Original release
- Network: CBS
- Release: September 8 – December 22, 1979

Related
- Mighty Mouse Playhouse (1955–1967); Mighty Mouse: The New Adventures (1987–1988)

The New Adventures of Mighty Mouse and Heckle & Jeckle is a 1979–1980 animated television series featuring newly produced Mighty Mouse and Heckle & Jeckle cartoons. The series was produced by Filmation, and aired from 1979 to 1980 on CBS with 96 episodes produced. It was the second Mighty Mouse cartoon series, following the original Mighty Mouse Playhouse from 1955 to 1967, and followed by Mighty Mouse: The New Adventures, which aired from 1987 to 1988.

== Production ==
CBS was looking to bring Mighty Mouse back to television for the first time since Mighty Mouse Playhouse went off the air in 1967. They had purchased the Terrytoons studio back in 1955 and eventually closed it in 1972. Without an animation studio of their own to produce new content, they licensed out their works to Filmation.

In the Mighty Mouse segments, Mighty Mouse protected the world and his love interest, Pearl Pureheart, from the evil machinations of Oil Can Harry and his new bumbling henchman, Swifty, a fat cat who could still run extremely fast. Their encounters could happen in any time period, with Pearl and the villains adopting roles specific for the era, though Mighty Mouse remained the same. Several changes were made to the Mighty Mouse formula for Filmation's series. The characters' operatic dialogue from the theatrical shorts was removed because producer Norm Prescott did not think that it would be acceptable to contemporary audiences. It was also removed to reduce the necessity to hire additional actors that could sing for roles that producer Lou Scheimer would fill in the various episodes (although Mighty Mouse would still belt some lines out, like his catchphrase, "Here I come to save the day!"). Filmation also abandoned the faux serialization tradition of starting off each entry as if it were a continuation of some non-existent previous part. Instead, events would unfold as Mighty Mouse usually watched for trouble through a giant telescope from his fortress on a cheese-like planet in space. One all-new story, the science fiction serial "The Great Space Chase", was serialized across the entire season in 16 parts. In keeping with broadcast standards of the time, the violence was toned down or non-existent.

For the Heckle and Jeckle segments, the magpies' antics were toned down to reduce their malevolent and sadistic nature, though they still remained somewhat madcap in their antics, particularly with fourth wall breaks. Jeckle was portrayed as the smarter of the pair. The series also introduced a new segment, Quacula. Quacula was a pale blue vampire duck with a Daffy Duck-like bill and fangs, dressed in a blue jacket and a black cape with a red lining, who slept by day in a white egg-shaped coffin, in the basement of a house owned by an anthropomorphic bear named Theodore (whose voice was an imitation of Joe E. Ross). Every night Quacula would rise from his coffin and try to terrify Theodore and others, but he would never really succeed; his antics tended to be more comical than frightening. Also, Theodore would come up with one plan after another to rid himself of Quacula, but always fail to do so.

Each hour of The New Adventures of Mighty Mouse and Heckle & Jeckle consisted of two Mighty Mouse cartoons, two Heckle and Jeckle cartoons, one Quacula cartoon, and one episode of "The Great Space Chase". Also included were two educational segments, "Mighty Mouse Environmental Bulletins" and Heckle and Jeckle's "Homonyms".

Filmation hired several animators and artists, including storyboard artists John Kricfalusi, Tom Minton, Eddie Fitzgerald, and screenwriter Paul Dini, who got their start working on the show and other productions such as Fat Albert and the Cosby Kids' The Brown Hornet. Kricfalusi, Kent Butterworth and other animators did not understand the limitations put on by network strictures and economic realities, and wanted to rebel against Filmation's mandates of reusable animation and their strict "on-model" policies (where model sheets had to be traced). Fitzgerald, Minton, and other storyboard artists drew humorous and lively boards as reference for the animators. (Note: Attributed to multiple references:) As a result, the animation and art was a lot more energetic than the original Terrytoons. For example, Fitzgerald storyboarded a scene in the episode "Movie Mouse" where Oil Can Harry does a wild take in response to Swifty telling him that he used handcuffs to tie up a snake. Scheimer and Prescott claimed that the scene could not be animated, but Butterworth insisted that it could, and spent a week working on it to prove it. The scene wound up in the finished episode. Kricfalusi, Fitzgerald, Minton and Butterworth would later go on to work on Ralph Bakshi's Mighty Mouse: The New Adventures, with Minton describing his work on that series as "revenge for what [they] couldn't do at Filmation". When he was first hired, Paul Dini was lighting models for Filmation. His father was a friend of Prescott's. During college, Dini was doing freelance scripts for Filmation. He sent the studio a script, and was given some work, writing some Quacula and Heckle and Jeckle episodes.

A panel of children's television experts assembled by TV Guide criticized the series, referring to it as "mindless and monotonous" with "relentless violence-based humor". After the series premiered, cartoonist Scott Shaw! filed suit against Filmation due to the fact that he had created a character named Duckula for the comic book Quack! #1 (July 1976), published by Star*Reach. Shaw! had been alerted by friends at Filmation that they had copies of Quack! on hand during production, and that Quacula's character model sheet seemed to be one of Bob Clampett's Daffy Duck with Duckula's features overlaid onto it (Shaw! would recruit Clampett as an expert witness). Additionally, Duckula had his own bear supporting character named Bearanboltz, a dim-witted pastiche of Frankenstein's monster. The matter was settled out of court by Filmation with Shaw! for $30,000, and after 16 episodes Quacula was dropped from the show. The show was shortened to a half-hour in 1980, and was moved to Sundays in its final season. Nine years later in 1988, Cosgrove Hall Films and Thames Television would create and produce the series Count Duckula, a spin-off of Danger Mouse. In 1982, "The Great Space Chase" was re-edited into an 80-minute movie which had a limited release to theaters. It later appeared on home video.

== Voice cast and their characters ==
- Alan Oppenheimer – Mighty Mouse, Oil Can Harry, Swifty, Narrator, Additional Voices
- Diane Pershing – Pearl Pureheart, Additional Voices
- Frank Welker – Heckle, Jeckle, Quacula, Theodore H. Bear, Additional Voices
- Lou Scheimer (uncredited) – Additional Voices
- Erika Scheimer (uncredited) - Additional Voices (episode 4)
- Norm Prescott (uncredited) - Additional Voices

== Episodes ==
No.	Original air date	Title	Written by:
1	September 8, 1979	Mouse of the Desert (Mighty Mouse)	Sam Simon
1	September 8, 1979	The Great Space Chase: Chapter 1	
1	September 8, 1979	Stop...Pay Troll (Mighty Mouse)	Sam Simon
1	September 8, 1979	Goldfeather (Heckle & Jeckle)	Bill Danch
1	September 8, 1979	Star Boars (Quacula)	Ted Pedersen
1	September 8, 1979	The Golden Egg (Heckle & Jeckle)	Dan DiStefano
2	September 15, 1979	Planks a Lot (Mighty Mouse)	Sam Simon
2	September 15, 1979	The Great Space Chase: Chapter 2	
2	September 15, 1979	The Exercist (Mighty Mouse)	Marc Richards
2	September 15, 1979	The Heroes (Heckle & Jeckle)	Ron Card
2	September 15, 1979	House for Sale (Quacula)	Ron Card
2	September 15, 1979	Cavebirds (Heckle & Jeckle)	Ted Pedersen
3	September 22, 1979	The Star of Cucamonga (Mighty Mouse)	Ron Card
3	September 22, 1979	The Great Space Chase: Chapter 3	
3	September 22, 1979	Gypsy Mice (Mighty Mouse)	Ted Pedersen
3	September 22, 1979	Show Business (Heckle & Jeckle)	Bill Danch
3	September 22, 1979	Weird Bear (Quacula)	Bill Danch & Ted Pedersen
3	September 22, 1979	Spurs (Heckle & Jeckle)	Ron Card
4	September 29, 1979	Loco Motivations (Mighty Mouse)	Dave Bascom
4	September 29, 1979	The Great Space Chase: Chapter 4	Buzz Dixon
4	September 29, 1979	Cats and Robbers (Mighty Mouse)	Bill Danch
4	September 29, 1979	Birds of Paradise (Heckle & Jeckle)	Ted Pedersen
4	September 29, 1979	Monster Mash (Quacula)	Ted Pedersen
4	September 29, 1979	The Open Road (Heckle & Jeckle)	Ted Pedersen
5	October 6, 1979	Blimp with the Wind (Mighty Mouse)	Dave Bascom
5	October 6, 1979	The Great Space Chase: Chapter 5	
5	October 6, 1979	Catula (Mighty Mouse)	Bill Danch
5	October 6, 1979	Robot Factory (Heckle & Jeckle)	Creighton Barnes
5	October 6, 1979	Uncle Ferenc (Quacula)	Ron Card
5	October 6, 1979	Farmer and the Crows (Heckle & Jeckle)	Ted Pedersen
6	October 13, 1979	Mouserace (Mighty Mouse)	Bill Danch
6	October 13, 1979	The Great Space Chase: Chapter 6	
6	October 13, 1979	The Sun Harnesser (Mighty Mouse)	Ron Card
6	October 13, 1979	Foreign Legion Birds (Heckle & Jeckle)	Dan DiStefano
6	October 13, 1979	The Magic Lamp (Quacula)	Ron Card
6	October 13, 1979	Mail Birds (Heckle & Jeckle)	Creighton Barnes
7	October 20, 1979	Movie Mouse (Mighty Mouse)	Sam Simon
7	October 20, 1979	The Great Space Chase: Chapter 7	
7	October 20, 1979	Mick Jaguar in Concert (Mighty Mouse)	Buzz Dixon
7	October 20, 1979	The Malcon-tents (Heckle & Jeckle)	Ron Card
7	October 20, 1979	Room for Rent (Quacula)	Ron Card
7	October 20, 1979	Bellhops (Heckle & Jeckle)	Nancy Schipper
8	October 27, 1979	Pheline of the Rock Opera (Mighty Mouse)	Bill Danch
8	October 27, 1979	The Great Space Chase: Chapter 8	Buzz Dixon
8	October 27, 1979	Captain Nemo-oh-oh (Mighty Mouse)	Bill Danch
8	October 27, 1979	Sphinx! (Heckle & Jeckle)	Ted Pedersen
8	October 27, 1979	Morgana La Duck (Quacula)	Paul Dini
8	October 27, 1979	Hang Two (Heckle & Jeckle)	Ted Pedersen
9	November 3, 1979	Snow Mouse (Mighty Mouse)	Ted Pedersen
9	November 3, 1979	The Great Space Chase: Chapter 9	
9	November 3, 1979	Haunted House Mouse (Mighty Mouse)	Bill Danch
9	November 3, 1979	Witch Way Outta Here (Heckle & Jeckle)	Dan DiStefano
9	November 3, 1979	Return of Star Boars (Quacula)	Ted Pedersen
9	November 3, 1979	C.B. Birds (Heckle & Jeckle)	Nancy Schipper
10	November 10, 1979	Cat Ness Monster (Mighty Mouse)	Creighton Barnes
10	November 10, 1979	The Great Space Chase: Chapter 10	Sam Simon & Buzz Dixon
10	November 10, 1979	Rugged Rodent (Mighty Mouse)	Buzz Dixon
10	November 10, 1979	Shopping Center (Heckle & Jeckle)	Ted Pedersen
10	November 10, 1979	Time and Before (Quacula)	Ted Pedersen
10	November 10, 1979	Where There's a Will (Heckle & Jeckle)	Ron Card & Bill Danch
11	November 17, 1979	Gorilla My Dreams (Mighty Mouse)	Bill Danch
11	November 17, 1979	The Great Space Chase: Chapter 11	
11	November 17, 1979	Cattenstein (Mighty Mouse)	Bill Danch
11	November 17, 1979	Identity Problem (Heckle & Jeckle)	Creighton Barnes
11	November 17, 1979	Bungled Burglary (Quacula)	Paul Dini
11	November 17, 1979	Time Warped (Heckle & Jeckle)	Paul Dini
12	November 24, 1979	Cat of the Baskervilles (Mighty Mouse)	Sam Simon
12	November 24, 1979	The Great Space Chase: Chapter 12	
12	November 24, 1979	Pearl of the Jungle (Mighty Mouse)	
12	November 24, 1979	Invisible Birds (Heckle & Jeckle)	
12	November 24, 1979	Shanghai Salty (Quacula)	Ted Pedersen
12	November 24, 1979	Marathon Bird (Heckle & Jeckle)	Nancy Schipper
13	December 1, 1979	Moby Whale (Mighty Mouse)	Buzz Dixon
13	December 1, 1979	The Great Space Chase: Chapter 13	
13	December 1, 1979	Big Top Cat (Mighty Mouse)	
13	December 1, 1979	Supermarket (Heckle & Jeckle)	Ted Pedersen
13	December 1, 1979	Pyramid (Quacula)	Ron Card & Bill Danch
13	December 1, 1979	Flowered Knighthood (Heckle & Jeckle)	Ted Pedersen
14	December 8, 1979	The Disorient Express (Mighty Mouse)	Sam Simon
14	December 8, 1979	The Great Space Chase: Chapter 14	
14	December 8, 1979	The Maltese Mouse (Mighty Mouse)	Buzz Dixon
14	December 8, 1979	Astrobirds (Heckle & Jeckle)	
14	December 8, 1979	Haunted House (Quacula)	Ron Card
14	December 8, 1979	Apartment Birds (Heckle & Jeckle)	
15	December 15, 1979	Beau Jest (Mighty Mouse)	Bill Danch
15	December 15, 1979	The Great Space Chase: Chapter 15	
15	December 15, 1979	Curse of the Cat (Mighty Mouse)	
15	December 15, 1979	The 25th Century (Heckle & Jeckle)	
15	December 15, 1979	Magic Duck (Quacula)	Ron Card
15	December 15, 1979	Safari Birds (Heckle & Jeckle)	Sam Simon
16	December 22, 1979	Around the World in 80 Ways (Mighty Mouse)	Ted Pedersen
16	December 22, 1979	The Great Space Chase: Chapter 16	
16	December 22, 1979	Tugboat Pearl (Mighty Mouse)	
16	December 22, 1979	Wonderland (Heckle & Jeckle)	
16	December 22, 1979	The Fantastic 2½ (Quacula)	Ted Pedersen
16	December 22, 1979	Arabian Nights and Days (Heckle & Jeckle)	
