= Treasure Island (1973 film) =

1973 animated film directed by Hal Sutherland

- DVD cover
- Directed by: Hal Sutherland
- Screenplay by: Ben Starr
- Based on: Treasure Island by Robert Louis Stevenson
- Produced by: Norm Prescott; Lou Scheimer
- Starring: Richard Dawson; Davy Jones; Dal McKennon; Larry D. Mann; Larry Storch; Jane Webb; Lou Scheimer
- Cinematography: R.W. Pope
- Edited by: Joseph Simon; Doreen Dixon
- Music by: George Blais; Jeff Michael (original score and songs)
- Production company: Filmation
- Distributed by: Warner Bros.
- Release date: December 9, 1973
- Running time: 87 minutes
- Country: United States
- Language: English
- Budget: $1 million

Treasure Island is a 1973 American animated musical adventure film directed by Hal Sutherland, produced by Filmation, released by Warner Bros., and based on Robert Louis Stevenson's 1883 novel of the same name.

In 1980, an edited version of the film was broadcast on NBC as a special.

== Plot ==
Aged sailor Billy Bones and his rum-loving pirate mouse Hiccup arrive at the Admiral Benbow Inn near Bristol, run by young Jim Hawkins and his widowed mother. He tells Jim the story of Captain J. Flint's buried treasure on a Caribbean island and warns him of a man with one leg. He then receives a summons from the blind beggar Pew containing "the Black Spot" and dies suddenly. Pew and a crew of pirates who formerly served Flint storm the inn, seeking to capture Jim and find the map to Flint's treasure, which Billy left behind in a box that Jim discovers. Together, Jim and Hiccup trick Pew and his crew into running outside the inn, thinking they are chasing them. Mounted excise officers led by Squire John Trelawney open fire on the pirates, who flee by boat. Trelawney, his gamekeeper Tom Redruth, and physician Dr. David Livesey arrive at the inn, taking an interest in the map.

Trelawney charts a course for the island housing Flint's treasure. On the schooner Hispanola, Jim is given the position of cabin boy by Captain Alexander Smollett. He and Hiccup become suspicious that many of Trelawney's hired men look like pirates. Their suspicions are raised further when they find that the cook, Long John Silver, is missing a leg and walks with a crutch that doubles as a firearm. Nevertheless, Silver forms a friendly bond with Jim and teaches him common sailing terminology. That night, Jim and Hiccup are awakened by Silver forcing some of the men to walk the plank on suspicion of being pirates. Hiding in an apple barrel, Jim and Hiccup overhear Silver and his men laughing about their tricking the pair, and Jim secretly informs Smollett's loyal men.

As the Hispanola approaches the island, Jim attempts to fake illness to avoid going to shore with Silver and the pirates, some of whom fake illness as well. Smollett's group escapes to the island by lifeboat when the pirates seize control of the ship. More of the pirates head to shore, so Jim and Hiccup stow away in a sack and slip out while the pirates are not looking. In the jungle, the duo encounters Ben Gunn, a marooned member of Flint's crew, who, due to his apparent insanity from five years of isolation, mixes up his English sentences and can speak the language of local goats. Gunn also presents Jim with an escape boat he has saved for emergencies. Jim finds his friends in an old stockade, where they do battle with the pirates until they retreat. As night falls, Jim and Hiccup take Gunn's boat to sneak onto the Hispanola, where they trick two of the pirates, including knife-throwing Israel Hands, into falling overboard. Jim sails the ship into the island's northern bay to keep it hidden.

The following morning, Jim returns to the stockade, where he and Hiccup are captured by Silver and his crew, with Silver tauntingly telling Jim that his friends are dead. As they follow Flint's map through the jungle, Silver causes some fatal accidents for the crew; when Jim notices the party shrinking, Silver assures him they are dying of jungle fever. By the time they reach the treasure's purported location, the crew is down to Silver's righthand man Tom Morgan and three German-speaking triplets. Digging under the tree, Morgan and the triplets find nothing. Believing that Silver misled him in order to claim the real treasure for himself, Morgan threatens to shoot Jim, to whose defense Silver rushes. Jim, Hiccup, and Silver do battle with Morgan and the triplets while Gunn secretly shoots an arrow to disarm Morgan. Smollett's group returns, riding on goats, and defeats the mutineers. With Silver and his men captured, Smollett's group receives Gunn's help in locating the real treasure, which he had hidden in a mountainside cavern.

On the way back to Bristol, Jim gives a blade stored inside a loaf of stale bread to a captured Silver as a thanks for saving his life, allowing Silver to saw off the bars on his cell and escape with part of the treasure. Redruth announces that he will use his share of the treasure to quit working for Trelawney. Jim happily accepts his new life as a law-abiding sailor, while Silver joyously returns to piracy.

== Voice cast ==
- Richard Dawson as Long John Silver
- Davy Jones as Jim Hawkins
- Dal McKennon as Captain Flint, Ben Gunn
- Larry D. Mann as Dr. Livesey
- Larry Storch as Captain Alexander Smollett
- Jane Webb as Mrs. Hawkins
- Lou Scheimer as Bearded sailor, pirate (uncredited)

== Production ==
The film was part of Family Classics, a series of films announced to be produced in mid-January 1972, based on concepts in the public domain commissioned by Warner Bros. Productions for the film and Oliver Twist had been finished by late 1973. The film's budget amounted to $1,050,000, with the million given by Warner Bros., and the rest put in by the studio itself.

== Release ==
Treasure Island was first broadcast as an NBC Special Treat special on April 29, 1980, with half of the film's runtime cut. The special was hosted by special guest star, Melissa Sue Anderson. The movie was first released on VHS on August 13, 1996, as part of the Warner Bros. Classic Tales series. It was first released on DVD on September 3, 2002, by Warner Home Video, through Warner Bros. Family Entertainment. It was released on VCD in 2005 by Alliance Entertainment Singapore Pte. Ltd.
