= Oliver Twist (1974 film) =

1974 film directed by Hal Sutherland

- DVD cover
- Directed by: Hal Sutherland
- Screenplay by: Ben Starr; Alan Dinehart
- Based on: Oliver Twist by Charles Dickens
- Produced by: Norm Prescott; Lou Scheimer
- Starring: Josh Albee; Phil Clark; Cathleen Cordell; Michael Evans; Lola Fisher; Robert Holt; Davy Jones; Larry D. Mann; Dallas McKennon; Billy Simpson; Larry Storch; Les Tremayne; Jane Webb; Helene Winston
- Cinematography: R.W. Pope
- Edited by: Joseph Simon; Doreen Dixon
- Music by: Yvette Blais; Jeff Michael (original score); Dave Roberts (song orchestrations and conductor); Sherry Gaden; Richard Canada (song composers); Richard Delvy; Ed Fournier (song producers); Dave Roberts; Richard Delvy; Ed Fournier (song arrangements)
- Production company: Filmation
- Distributed by: Warner Bros.
- Release date: July 10, 1974
- Running time: 91 minutes
- Country: United States
- Language: English
- Budget: $1.050.000

Oliver Twist is a 1974 American animated adventure musical comedy drama film directed by Hal Sutherland that is based on Charles Dickens's 1838 novel of the same name. The film was the second and last to be produced by Filmation and distributed by Warner Bros. Davy Jones, who played The Artful Dodger in the original Broadway production of Oliver!, reprises his role.

== Plot ==
In the 19th century, orphan Oliver Twist is sent to a workhouse, where the children are barely fed and mistreated. He moves to the house of an undertaker, but after an unfair severe spanking and slapping, he starts a seven-day runaway to London. He arrives exhausted and starving, and is welcomed by a gang of pickpockets led by old crook Fagin. When he is mistakenly taken as a thief, wealthy victim Mr. Brownlow brings Oliver to his home and shelters him. But Fagin and the dangerous Bill Sykes decide to kidnap Oliver to burglarize Mr. Brownlow's fancy house. Oliver is wounded, while Mr. Brownlow tries to save Oliver.

== Cast ==
- Josh Albee as Oliver Twist
  - Billy Simpson as Oliver Twist (singing)
- Jane Webb as Nancy
- Les Tremayne as Fagin
- Dallas McKennon as Bookseller, Charlie Bates
- Davy Jones as The Artful Dodger
- Larry Storch as Magistrate Fang
- Cathleen Cordell as Mrs. Corney
- Also featuring the voices of: Phil Clark, Michael Evans, Lola Fisher, Robert Holt, Larry D. Mann and Helene Winston.

== Production ==
The film was announced to be produced in mid-January 1972, as part of Family Classics, a series of films based on concepts in the public domain commissioned by Warner Bros. Production for the film and Treasure Island had been finished by late 1973. The film's budget amounted to $1,050,000, with the million given by Warner Bros., and the rest put in by the studio itself.

== Release ==
Oliver Twist was first released in theaters on July 10, 1974. According to media historian Hal Erickson, its distributor, Warner Bros., "virtually threw away the film when it performed poorly in previews." An edited version was broadcast as an NBC Special Treat special on April 14, 1981. The movie was first released on VHS on December 5, 1994, and re-released on August 13, 1996, as part of the Warner Bros. Classic Tales series. It was first released on DVD on September 3, 2002, by Warner Home Video, through Warner Bros. Family Entertainment.

=== Critical reception ===
Variety panned the film, saying that "neither Dickens nor the youngsters watching will profit much from this one," although the animation showcasing the streets of London received praise.
