= Journey to the Center of the Earth (TV series) =

1967 American animated TV series

- Genre: Animation
- Written by: Don Christensen; Barry Gaines; Ken Sobol
- Directed by: Norm McCabe; Hal Sutherland; Lou Zukor
- Voices of: Ted Knight; Pat Harrington Jr.; Jane Webb
- Country of origin: United States
- Original language: English
- No. of seasons: 1
- No. of episodes: 17

Production
- Producers: Lou Scheimer; Norm Prescott
- Running time: 30 minutes
- Production companies: Filmation Associates; 20th Century-Fox Television

Original release
- Network: ABC
- Release: September 9, 1967 – September 6, 1969

Journey to the Center of the Earth is an American science fiction Saturday-morning cartoon, consisting of 17 episodes, each running 30 minutes. Produced by Filmation in association with 20th Century Fox Television, it aired from September 9, 1967, to September 6, 1969, on ABC Saturday Morning. It featured the voice of Ted Knight as Professor Lindenbrook/Sacknussem. It was later shown in reruns on Sci Fi Channel's Cartoon Quest.

It appears to have taken the 1959 film, Journey to the Center of the Earth, as its starting point rather than Jules Verne's original 1864 novel; e.g., including the character of Count Sacknussem and Gertrude the duck. However, it moved even further away from Verne's novel than the 1959 film did.

There are currently no plans to release the series on DVD and/or Blu-ray Disc from 20th Century Studios Home Entertainment, although most of the series is available for viewing on YouTube.

== Opening narration ==
Long ago, a lone explorer named Arne Sacknussem made a fantastic descent to the fabled lost kingdom of Atlantis at the Earth's core. After many centuries, his trail was discovered: first by me, Professor Oliver Lindenbrook, my niece Cindy, student Alec McEwen, our guide Lars and his duck Gertrude. But we were not alone. The evil Count Sacknussem, last descendant of the once noble Sacknussem family, had followed us... to claim the center of the Earth for his power-mad schemes. He ordered his brute-like servant, Torg, to destroy our party. But the plan backfired, sealing the entrance forever. And so, for us, began a desperate race to the Earth's core... to learn the secret of the way back. This is the story of our new journey to the center of the Earth!

== Episodes ==
No.	Title	Written by	Original release date
1	"Arena of Fear"	Ralph Goodman	September 9, 1967
After the explorers help out a seemingly fearsome beast, it turns out to be benign. Later, they discover it's been captured along with other creatures and Lindenbrook by a gigantic caveman. This caveman releases the beasts to chase after Lindenbrook, but the man-beast remembers Lindenbrook's act of kindness, and saves him.
2	"Caveman Captives"	Bill Keenan	September 16, 1967
Lars injures his arm fighting a Pterodactyl. Lars and Cindy are also separated from the Professor and Alec, who are captured by a tribe of prehistoric cavemen.
3	"The Creative World"	Ken Sobol	September 23, 1967
Alec is captured by Wolf Men who have aligned themselves with Count Sacknussem. While the Professor attempts a rescue, Lars and Cindy team up with the Wolf Men’s enemies who are descendants of the ancient Druids.
4	"Creatures of the Swamp"	Ken Sobol	September 30, 1967
Lars is captured by a primitive tribe, and imprisoned underwater. The rest of the expedition get help from another tribe, but before long Alec, Count Sacknussem, and Torg are captured by the enemy as well.
5	"The Doomed Island"	Ken Sobol	October 7, 1967
When their boat is attacked by creatures that are half human and half spider, Lindenbrook and company end up on a magnetic island. Alec and Cindy are put inside a water-filled crater, while Lindenbrook and Lars are forced to build a boat for the tribe that inhabits the island. Note: Count Sacknussem and Torg do not appear in this episode.
6	"The Frozen Furies"	Donald R. Christensen	October 14, 1967
Chief Hok of the Frozen Furies is chipping ice from Norway's underground glaciers. Lindenbrook intends to stop the Furies' drilling sound devices to save the surface world. Note: This is the second and final episode from which Count Sacknussem and Torg are absent.
7	"The Labyrinth Builders"	Fred Halliday	October 21, 1967
A race of beelike humanoids capture Lindenbrook, Lars, Cindy, and Torg, and imprison them in a giant hive, intending to cook them alive with heated honey. Alec, Gertrude, and Count Sacknussem team up to rescue them.
8	"Land of the Dead"	Ken Sobol	October 28, 1967
After getting caught in a whirlpool, Alec ends up in the Land of the Dead, where he is separated from the others.
9	"The Living City"	Ken Sobol	November 4, 1967
Crossing an underground desert in a makeshift sand boat, the travelers come upon a deserted city where some controlling presence pits all the insects, statues and even a group of mummies against them.
10	"The Living Totems"	Marshall Williams and Kenneth Rotcop	November 11, 1967
The explorers encounter the Living Totems, which are angry about a stolen diamond and believe all humans are only capable of violence.
11	"Moths of Doom"	Ken Sobol	November 18, 1967
Lindenbrook, Lars, Sacknussem and Torg find themselves put in jail by "The Controllers" while passing through a land filled with insects.
12	"Ocean of Destruction"	Ken Sobol	November 25, 1967
Crossing a dry ocean bed, Lindenbrook and company find various lost ships (including The Flying Dutchman) that are crewed by Frog People who act and dress like pirates.
13	"Perils of Volcano Island"	Larry Goldman; Based on a story by: Barry Gaines	December 2, 1967
Near the volcanic Destruction Canyon, the Lindenbrook expedition finds a map by Arne Sacknussem. Alec, Cindy, and Gertrude are hit by a strange petrifying gas and Count Sacknussem takes them hostage to trade for the map.
14	"Return of Gulliver"	Ken Sobol	December 9, 1967
The Land of Giants is the setting of a war between the Giants and the Lilliputians from across the river.
15	"Revenge of the Fossils"	Ken Sobol	December 16, 1967
Lindenbrook inadvertently brings the fossils of the Earth’s first civilization back to life with fire. The fossil beings intend to rule the world themselves, in spite of Sacknussem attempting to enslave them.
16	"Sleeping Slaves of Zeerah"	Donald R. Christensen	December 23, 1967
Captured by Zeerah's soldiers, the Lindenbrook party is taken before the sorceress Queen Mortia. Professor Lindenbrook tries to convince her that he has his own magic powers.
17	"Trail of Gold"	Ken Sobol	December 30, 1967
Professor Lindenbrook and his friends have finally found the golden city of Atlantis and their way back to the surface world - or so it seems.

== Series credits ==
- Directed By Hal Sutherland
- Co-Directed By Norm McCabe, Lou Zukor
- Production Designer: Don Christensen
- Layout: Wes Herschensohn, Marilee Heyer, Ken Hultgren, Ray Jacobs, Mel Keefer, Dan Noonan
- Storyboards: Jan Green, Sherman Labby
- Background Supervisor: Ervin Kaplan
- Backgrounds: Venetia Epler, Martin Forte, Jack Healey, Ted Littlefield, Lorraine Morgan, Paul Xander
- Animators: Bob Bransford, Clark Davis, Otto Feuer, Ed Friedman, George Grandpre, Bill Hajee, Bob Kirk, Clarke Mallery, Jack Ozark, Amby Paliwoda, Virgil Raddatz, Lenn Redman, Len Rogers, Virgil Ross, Herb Rothwill, Bob Trochim, Xenia
- Ink and Paint Supervisor: Martha Buckley
- Assistant Ink and Paint Supervisor: Betty Brooks
- Animation Check: Ruth Craig, Renee Henning, Barbara Koponen, Ann Oliphant, Jane Philippi, Marion Turk
- Editorial Supervisor: Joseph Simon
- Assistant Film Editor: Lester Meisenheimer
- Film Coordinator: June Gilham
- Production Coordinator: Joe Lynch
- Production Assistant: Greg Kirsanoff
- Background Music Composed By John Gart
- Music Supervised By Gordon Zahler
- Sound By Ryder Sound Service
- Color By Technicolor
- Voice Talents Of Ted Knight, Pat Harrington, Jr., Jane Webb
- Produced By Lou Scheimer And Norm Prescott
