= Diane Pershing =

Retired American voice actress

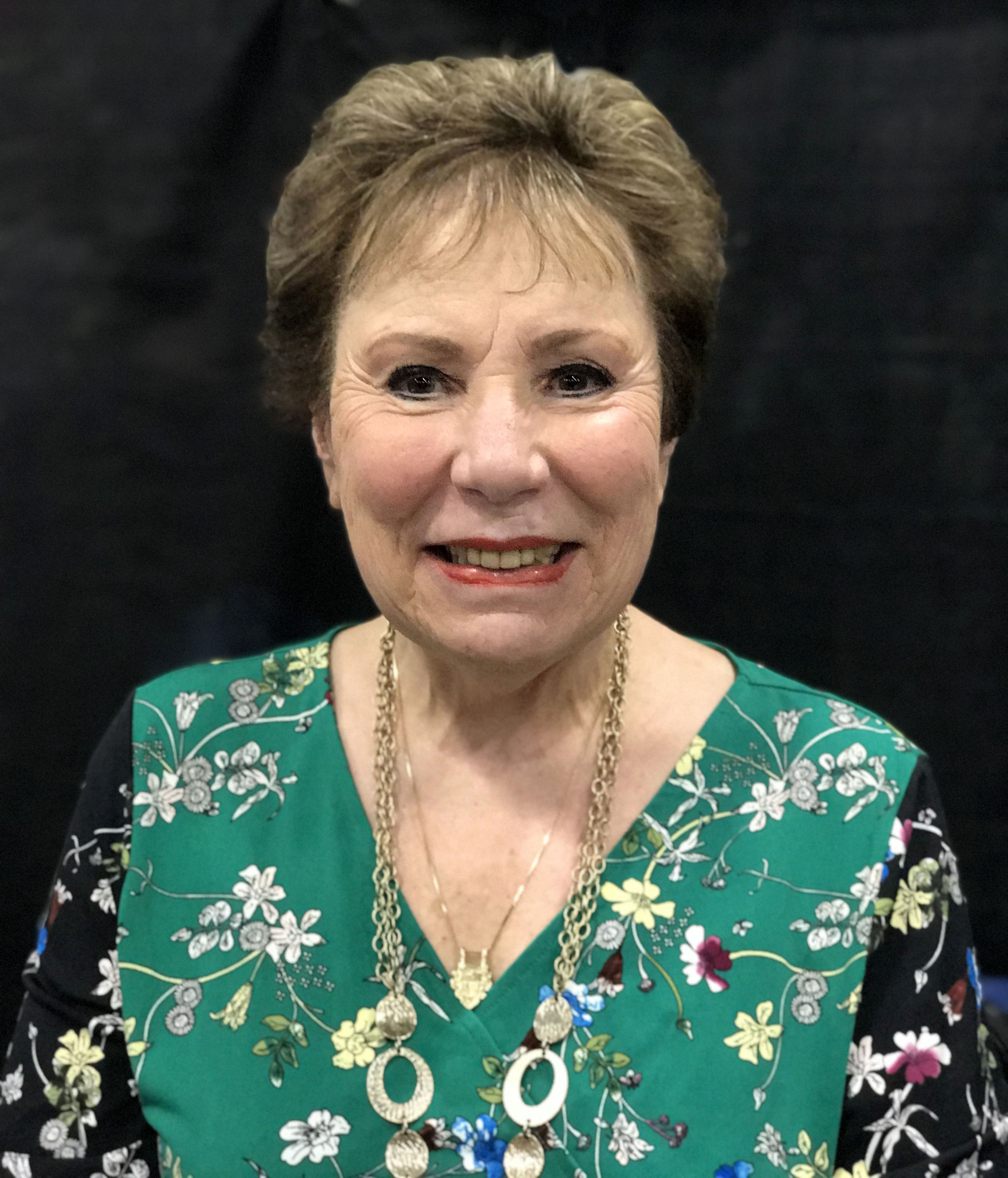
- Pershing at the 2019 East Coast Comicon
- Born: Queens, New York City, U.S.
- Education: University of California, Los Angeles (BA)
- Occupations: Voice actress, singer
- Years active: 1978–2010
- Children: 2
- Website: www.dianepershing.com

Diane Pershing is a retired American voice actress, film critic, and novelist. She began her singing career as a back-up singer for Johnny Mathis and went on to appear in the show group, The Establishment, on tour and on TV. She also voiced Poison Ivy in the DC Animated Universe.

== Early life ==
Pershing was born in Queens, New York. She has a Bachelor of Arts degree from the University of California, Los Angeles.

== Career ==
Pershing appeared with The Establishment in Las Vegas and sang with Mathis, Elvis Presley, and Andy Williams. She performed in regional theater, including the Downey Civic Light Opera Association. In total, she performed in more than 100 musicals and plays at regional theaters.

Pershing was a disc jockey at radio station KOST in Los Angeles, did studio singing, and did voiceovers for cartoons, commercials, narrations, and radio and television promos.

As a writer, she wrote for TV (The Love Boat, What's Happening Now!!), 19 romance novels, published film reviews for various small newspapers and Rotten Tomatoes, and is a member of Romance Writers of American and Mystery Writers of America and The Authors' Guild.

As a voice actress, Pershing is known for voicing Poison Ivy in the DC Animated Universe, beginning with Batman: The Animated Series. She also lent her voice to series such as Inspector Gadget, Darkwing Duck, The New Adventures of Flash Gordon, The Centurions (as Crystal Kane), Dungeons & Dragons, She-Ra: Princess of Power and The Smurfs.

== Personal life ==
Pershing has been married, and she has two children.

== Filmography ==
=== Film ===
Year	Title	Role	Notes
1980	A Snow White Christmas	Snow White	Television film
1982	Flash Gordon: The Greatest Adventure of All	Dale Arden	Television film
1982	Mighty Mouse in the Great Space Chase	Pearl Pureheart	
1984	Gallavants	Nesse	
1997	Ravager	Des	

=== Television ===
Year	Title	Role	Notes
1978	The Freedom Force	Isis	5 episodes
1978	Tarzan and the Super 7	Isis	5 episodes
1979	The New Adventures of Mighty Mouse and Heckle & Jeckle	Pearl Pureheart	
1979–1982	The New Adventures of Flash Gordon	Dale Arden, Queen Undina, Queen Azura, Queen Desira	24 episodes
1982–1988	The Smurfs	Additional voices	2 episodes
1985	Inspector Gadget	Sadie	Episode: "Gadget and Old Lace"
1986	The Centurions	Crystal Kane	65 episodes
1986	Wildfire	Lady Aura	Episode: "Strangers in the Night"
1986–1987	Defenders of the Earth	Dynak X, Dale Arden	25 episodes
1986–1987	She-Ra: Princess of Power	Netossa, Spinnerella	4 episodes
1988	Superman	Mrs. White	Episode: "Wildsharkk/To Play or Not to Play"
1989	The Karate Kid	Additional voices	Episode: "My Brother's Keeper"
1991	The Legend of Prince Valiant	Elizabeth, Will's Wife, Gypsy, Women, Maid	5 episodes
1992–1994	Batman: The Animated Series	Poison Ivy	8 episodes
1992	Goof Troop	Launch Countdown Computer, Sandee Seznee	Episode: "E=MC Goof"
1992	Darkwing Duck	Woman Next to Henry	Episode: "Fraudcast News"
1997–1998	The New Batman Adventures	Poison Ivy	4 episodes
2000–2002	Gotham Girls	Poison Ivy	25 episodes
2002	Rugrats	Caroller	Episode: "Babies in Toyland"
2003	Static Shock	Poison Ivy	Episode: "Hard as Nails"
2003	Justice League	Poison Ivy	Episode: "A Better World"

=== Video games ===
Year	Title	Role	Notes
1983	Tron: Solar Sailer	Yori	
1994	Quest for Glory IV	Erana, Rusalka	
1994	The Adventures of Batman & Robin	Poison Ivy	Sega CD version
1997	Zork: Grand Inquisitor	Fishmarket Lady, Shona	
1998	Baldur's Gate	Centeol, Safana, Tamoko	
2000	Baldur's Gate II: Shadows of Amn	Adalon	
2000	Invictus: In the Shadow of Olympus		
2001	Fallout Tactics: Brotherhood of Steel		
2001	Arcanum: Of Steamworks and Magick Obscura	Silver Lady	
2001	Batman: Vengeance	Poison Ivy	
2008	White Knight Chronicles	Dragon Matriarch	
2010	Fallout: New Vegas	Additional voices	
