= Erika Scheimer =

American actress (born 1960)

- Born: Erika C. Scheimer; March 28, 1960 (age 66); Los Angeles, California, U.S.
- Occupations: Actress, producer
- Years active: 1972–1990
- Father: Lou Scheimer

Erika C. Scheimer (born March 28, 1960) is an American former voice actress in cartoons of defunct animation studio Filmation. She is the daughter of Lou Scheimer, who was an integral member of Filmation and a voice actor in his own right.

== Career ==
She is best recognized for her work on the original He-Man and the Masters of the Universe cartoon, where she provided additional female voices and occasional voice-acting for young boys (such as Prince Adam's cousin). She is often mistaken for her mother Joanne "Jay" Wucher (1931–2009) as the second voice for Queen Marlena, originally voiced by Linda Gary.

Scheimer also provided many voices for the spin-off series, She-Ra: Princess of Power, including Frosta, Queen Angella, Imp, Perfuma, Peekablue, Loo-Kee, and Flutterina. Additionally, she, along with her father, provided voices for Bill Cosby's Fat Albert and the Cosby Kids.

In 1973, she voiced Marcia Brady in the second season of the animated The Brady Kids series.

== Personal life ==
In 2007, Scheimer publicly declared her homosexuality. In an interview with Terrance Griep, Scheimer explained that she felt comfortable as a lesbian working for Filmation: "I was a strong female voice myself, and—guess what?—I happened to be gay. Does that make any difference about anything? I'll tell you one thing, it didn't matter, because Filmation was one of the gayest places in town."

She has an older brother Lane (born December 25, 1956).

== Filmography ==
=== Voice roles ===
==== Film ====
Year	Title	Role	Notes
1985	He-Man and She-Ra: The Secret of the Sword	Queen Angella / Imp	
1987	Pinocchio and the Emperor of the Night	Water Bug / Boy	Uncredited

==== Television ====
Year	Title	Role	Notes
1972–1973	Lassie's Rescue Rangers	Susan Turner	16 episodes
1972–1985	Fat Albert and the Cosby Kids	Tweeterbell / Various voices	28 episodes
1973	The Brady Kids	Marcia Brady	5 episodes
1973	Mission: Magic!	Carol / Kim	16 episodes
1976	Tarzan, Lord of the Jungle	Carna / Nina	4 episodes
1977	The Fat Albert Halloween Special	Diesel	Television movie
1977	Space Sentinels	Fauna	Episode: "Fauna"
1977	Space Academy	Peepo / Var	15 episodes
1977	The Fat Albert Christmas Special	Various	Television movie
1978–1979	Jason of Star Command	Peepo	12 episodes
1979–1980	The New Adventures of Mighty Mouse and Heckle and Jeckle	Native Dancer	Voice role; Episode: "Birds of Paradise"
1980	A Snow White Christmas	Snow White	Television movie
1980–1982	The Tarzan/Lone Ranger/Zorro Adventure Hour	Mary / Bridget Kelly / Woman in Bank	9 episodes
1981	Blackstar	Delilah / The Emerald Knight	2 episodes
1981	Hero High	Bratman	26 episodes
1981–1982	The Kid Super Power Hour with Shazam!	Bratman	26 episodes
1982	The Fat Albert Easter Special	Tweeterbell	Television movie
1983–1985	He-Man and the Masters of the Universe	Lady Arvela / Ommy / Various voices	74 episodes
1985	He-Man and She-Ra: A Christmas Special	Peekablue / Flutterina / Perfuma / Mother	Television movie
1985–1987	She-Ra: Princess of Power	Frosta / Queen Angella / Imp / Perfuma / Peekablue / Loo-Kee / Flutterina / Scout / Swifty's Baby / Various voices	93 episodes
1986	Ghostbusters	Shock Clock / Skelevator / Mr. Clam / Corky / Various voices	65 episodes
1987–1988	BraveStarr	Empress Nadia / Wild Child / Various voices	65 episodes
