= Lou Scheimer =

American film producer and voice actor (1928–2013)

- Born: Louis Scheimer; October 19, 1928; Pittsburgh, Pennsylvania, U.S.
- Died: October 17, 2013 (aged 84); Tarzana, California, U.S.
- Other names: Erik Gunden, Erika Lane
- Education: Carnegie Mellon University
- Occupations: Animator, voice actor
- Years active: 1957–2013
- Spouse: Jay Wucher (died 2009)
- Children: 2, including Erika

Louis Scheimer (October 19, 1928 – October 17, 2013) was an American producer and voice actor who was one of the original founders of Filmation. He was also credited as an executive producer of many of its cartoons.

== Early life and education ==
Scheimer was the son of a German Jew who, according to family legend, had to leave Germany in the early 1920s after punching a young Adolf Hitler in 1921 or 1922, "well before" the Beer Hall Putsch.

Scheimer graduated from Carnegie Tech University (now Carnegie Mellon University) in Pittsburgh, Pennsylvania, with a bachelor's degree in fine arts in 1952.

== Career ==
In the mid-1950s, Scheimer worked at commercial art studios and animation studios like Kling Studios, Walter Lantz Productions (where he painted backgrounds on the Tex Avery short Crazy Mixed Up Pup), Ray Patin Productions, Warner Bros. Cartoons (where he worked as a layout artist and background painter on Gateways to the Mind and The Mouse That Jack Built), and Hanna-Barbera (where he worked on The Ruff and Reddy Show).

He was appointed to the position of art director while working at Larry Harmon Pictures on the made-for-TV Bozo and Popeye cartoons. He formed a close working relationship with former Disney animator Hal Sutherland, with the two later becoming business partners. Larry Harmon eventually closed the studio in 1961. Scheimer and Sutherland went to work at a small company called True Line. While working there, they were contracted by SIB Productions, a Japanese firm with U.S. offices in Chicago, who approached them about producing a cartoon called Rod Rocket. The two agreed to take on the work and also took on a project for Family Films, Life of Christ, a series of ten short animated films based on the life of Christ. Paramount Pictures soon purchased SIB Productions, and the contract allowed True Line to hire additional staff, such as former radio disc jockey Norm Prescott. Scheimer and Sutherland formed a close relationship with their new co-worker.

In 1962, Scheimer, Sutherland and Prescott eventually left True Line, and Scheimer began independently working on commercials. He figured that he could form his own company to produce animation. In September 1962, he, Sutherland and Ira Epstein, who had worked for Harmon but had left the firm, formed Filmation Associates. The company's name was invented because according to Scheimer, "We were working on film, but doing animation." Prescott joined them soon after the company's formation, and the trio were the company's main producers. They immediately started work on Journey Back to Oz, an animated sequel to the MGM film The Wizard of Oz and loosely based on the Oz series of books by L. Frank Baum. Due to financial problems, it took them about a decade to complete the film.

In the meantime, Filmation turned their attention to a more successful medium, network television. For the next few years they made television commercials and some other projects for other companies and made an unsuccessful pilot film for a Marx Brothers cartoon series. They also tried to develop an original series named The Adventures of Stanley Stoutheart (later renamed Yank and Doodle), but they were never able to sell it and almost closed down.

That was until they were approached by DC Comics editor Mort Weisinger to do a cartoon based on Superman. Superman premiered on September 10, 1966, and was followed by several of the other DC superheroes, and then, in 1968, the first Archie Show. Both series greatly helped Filmation's popularity to increase into the 1970s, when it scored big with several of its series, such as Fat Albert and the Cosby Kids and Star Trek: The Animated Series. For Star Trek: The Animated Series, Scheimer won the Daytime Emmy Award for Outstanding Entertainment - Children's Series.

Early in Filmation's history, Scheimer also contributed a number of guest or secondary voices for the various productions. Most notably, he provided the voice of Dumb Donald on Fat Albert and the Cosby Kids. He was also the voice of Legal Eagle and the Brown Hornet's sidekick Stinger, and did voice-over narration during the opening credits of the majority of Filmation shows and cartoons. In Jason of Star Command and Space Academy, he was consistently heard as generic voices over intercoms. In the live-action series The Ghost Busters, which starred Forrest Tucker and Larry Storch with Bob Burns, he was the voice of Zero, the unseen boss of the main characters.

Scheimer also provided the voices of Stubby on The New Adventures of Gilligan, N'kima on Tarzan, Lord of the Jungle, Bat-Mite, the Bat-Computer and Clayface on The New Adventures of Batman, M.O. on Space Sentinels, Trouble, Spinner and Scarab on Tarzan and the Super 7's Superstretch and Microwoman and Web Woman, Dinny on Fabulous Funnies, Tom Cat, Jerry Mouse, Spike, Tuffy, Slick Wolf and Barney Bear on The Tom and Jerry Comedy Show, the Olympian Computer on Sport Billy, Gremlin on The New Adventures of Flash Gordon, Bumper on Gilligan's Planet, and Tracy the Gorilla on Ghostbusters.

The Filmation studio had emerged as a leading company in television animation, but it was no longer an independent company. The studio was purchased by the TelePrompTer Corporation in 1969. Westinghouse Electric Corporation, through its Group W Productions division, acquired Filmation along with its purchase of TelePrompTer's cable and entertainment properties in 1981. Despite this, Scheimer continued leading the company.

He played a significant role in the creation of the cartoons He-Man and the Masters of the Universe and BraveStarr. As well as the executive producer, he was also co-credited for the series' musical score under the pseudonym "Erika Lane" (which combined the names of his daughter Erika and son Lane). It had also been used as a character name on the 1967 Filmation series Fantastic Voyage. Scheimer became a voice actor for the show (as he had done for many of his company's previous productions), going under the pseudonym "Erik Gunden". The last name was taken from his father's original surname: "Gundenscheimer" (which was later shortened to Scheimer). The first name was Lou's middle name, which he was not given by his parents, but instead by his wife Jay, who felt that he should have one. Scheimer's contribution to the cast was, in fact, most notable as he voiced several supporting characters, including Orko (and other characters with a similar Smurfs-voice), Stratos, King Randor and others. The reason that Scheimer performed the voices for so many supporting characters was that the "official" voice actors were contracted to perform no more than three different voices per episode. Since there were usually only three regular cast members working on each show, Scheimer would fill in the rest of the male cast. This is also why his wife and daughter did various small parts in the first season of He-Man, with Erika Scheimer performing supporting female voices and occasional voice-acting for young boy characters.

During the second season of He-Man, and all of She-Ra: Princess of Power, Erika received an onscreen credit as an actor and also directed the voice actors, and she and her father recorded the remaining voices on their own later, because he did not see himself as a "proper" actor and was ashamed of recording with the other voice actors due to severe budget restrictions. The pitch of his voice was often changed by using a "harmonizer", which could control the pitch without altering the speed of the sound.

The animated series also pioneered a type of programming known as first-run syndication. Another first was the storyline being based on an action figure toy; before this time, FCC regulations had prohibited any type of children's programming being based on a toy. Scheimer transformed He-Man from a graphically violent version of Conan the Barbarian into a pro-social character, who imparted a life lesson to impressionable viewers in each episode.

In 1989, Westinghouse shut down Filmation and sold the studio's properties to L'Oréal. Scheimer effectively went into retirement after the end of his studio. In the late 1990s, he returned to the field of animation. A Dutch investment company, Dreamweavers, NV., approached him with a concept based on an off-kilter Dutchman's renderings of characters aimed at young adults. Scheimer went into production on Robin and the Dreamweavers, an adult animated feature film. Robin, the first human to be born in cyberspace, battles Triple XXX: an evil siren who desires an earthly body, and who gains power through mankind's baser carnal desires. The movie, which has been compared to the majority of Ralph Bakshi's work, was never distributed. Scheimer also provided consultation work for Gang of Seven (G7) Animation.

The Lou Scheimer Gallery at the ToonSeum, a museum of comic and cartoon art in Pittsburgh, Pennsylvania, is named in his honor.

== Personal life ==
Scheimer was married to Joanne "Jay" Wucher (September 29, 1931–February 19, 2009) until her death. They had one son, born on December 25, 1956, and one daughter, Erika, born March 28, 1960. In 2012, he married Mary Ann Wucher, Jay's sister-in-law.

Scheimer underwent quadruple bypass surgery in the late 1990s and was subsequently diagnosed with Parkinson's disease. In 2012, he was honored with an Inkpot Award for his contributions to animation. He died from the disease at his home in Tarzana, California, on October 17, 2013, aged 84.

== Filmography ==
=== Film ===
Year	Title	Role	Notes
1972	Journey Back to Oz	Tin Woodman's Guard	Voice role; Uncredited
1973	Treasure Island	Bearded Sailor / Pirate	Voice role; Uncredited
1982	Mighty Mouse in the Great Space Chase	Various voices	Voice role; Uncredited
1985	He-Man and She-Ra: The Secret of the Sword	King Randor / Spirit/Swift Wind / Kowl / Mantenna / Horde Trooper / Kobra Khan / Leech / Trap Jaw / Tri-Klops / Broom / Sprag / Sprocker / Garv the Innkeeper / Bard / Messenger / Horde Computer	Voice role; Credited as "Erik Gunden"
1987	Pinocchio and the Emperor of the Night	Mouse / Water Bug / Doorman	Voice role; Uncredited
1988	BraveStarr: The Legend	Captain Andrews / Townsman	Voice role; Uncredited
1989	Happily Ever After	Mouse	Voice role; Uncredited

=== Television ===
Year	Title	Role	Notes
1966	Bulldog Bonnd	Tomo	Voice role; Unsold television pilot
1968–1969	The Adventures of Batman	Various voices	Voice role; 17 episodes
1972	The ABC Saturday Superstar Movie	Movie Director / Lance / Town Crier	Voice role; Episode: Daffy Duck and Porky Pig Meet the Groovie Goolies
1972–1985	Fat Albert and the Cosby Kids	Dumb Donald / Cluck / Albert's Father / Stinger / Legal Eagle / Various voices	Voice role; 110 episodes
1973	Lassie's Rescue Rangers	Duane Johnson / Mr. Johnson	Voice role; Episode: "Lost"
1973	Mission: Magic!	Mr. Mayor / Reporter	Voice role; Episode: "The City Inside the Earth"
1973–1974	Star Trek: The Animated Series	Dramian Guard / Romulan Crewman / Lemus	Voice role; 3 episodes
1974–1975	The New Adventures of Gilligan	Snubby the Monkey	Voice role; 24 voices
1974–1976	Shazam!	Narrator / Solomon / Hercules / Atlas / Zeus / Achilles / Mercury	Voice role; 27 episodes
1975	The Ghost Busters	Zero	Voice role; 15 episodes
1975–1976	M-U-S-H	Budget Committee Members	Voice role; Episode: "The Big Budget Car"
1976	Ark II	Adam / Merry Man / Kitchen Computer / Narrator	Voice role; 15 episodes
1976	Hey, Hey, Hey, It's the CBS Saturday Preview Special	Dumb Donald	Preview show
1976–1979	Tarzan, Lord of the Jungle	N'Kima / Bol Mangani Guard / Various voices	Voice role; 36 episodes
1977	The New Adventures of Batman	Bat-Mite / Batcomputer / Clayface/Matt Hagen / Lucky's Henchman / Prison Guard	Voice role; 16 episodes
1977	The Fat Albert Halloween Special	Dumb Donald	Voice role; Television movie
1977	Space Sentinels	M.O. / Brad / Dr. Kerlin / Various voices	Voice role; 13 episodes
1977	Space Academy	Station Intercome / Fracture the Parrot / Taca / Various voices	Voice role; 9 episodes
1977	The Fat Albert Christmas Special	Dumb Donald / Doctor	Voice role; Television movie
1978	Fabulous Funnies	Dinny / Magic Mirror / Fish / Michael / Angelo / Mr. Clangborn / Cashier / Hazy Woods / Police Officer / Various voices	Voice roles; 13 episodes
1978–1979	Tarzan and the Super 7	Trouble / Spinner / Scarab / Thirsty Egyptian / Police Officer / Various voices	Voice roles; 26 episodes
1978–1979	Jason of Star Command	Narrator / Various voices	Voice roles; 28 episodes
1979	The New Adventures of Mighty Mouse and Heckle and Jeckle	Various voices	Voice role; 16 episodes
1979–1982	The New Adventures of Flash Gordon	Gremlin / Robot / Lizard Man	Voice role; 16 episodes
1980–1981	Sport Billy	Olympian Computer / Various voices	Voice role; 25 episodes
1980–1982	The Tarzan/Lone Ranger/Zorro Adventure Hour	Les Barton / Trail Boss / Kurt	Voice role; 27 episodes
1980	The Tom and Jerry Comedy Show	Tom Cat / Jerry Mouse / Spike (wraparound segments, episodes 6-15) / Tuffy / Slick (wraparound segments, episodes 7-15) / Barney Bear (wraparound segments, episode 4, episodes 7-15) / Various voices	Voice role; 15 episodes
1981–1982	Hero High	A.W.O.L. / Peter Penguin / Giggler / Chief Hardy / Opening Narrator / Various voices	Voice role; 26 episodes
1981–1982	The Kid Super Power Hour with Shazam!	Sterling Morris / Mister Mind / Black Adam / Ibac / Narrator	Voice role; 38 episodes
1981–1982	The New Adventures of Zorro	Peasant / Coach Driver / Servant	Voice role; 7 episodes
1981–1982	Blackstar	Prince Dahl / Vizier / Ice Guard	Voice role; 9 episodes
1982	The Fat Albert Easter Special	Dumb Donald / Stinger / Narrator / Seymour / Kaznak / Rabbits / Doctor	Voice role; Television movie
1982	Gilligan's Planet	Bumper	Voice role; 13 episodes
1983–1985	He-Man and the Masters of the Universe	Orko / King Randor / Stratos / Man-E-Faces / Mekaneck / Zodac / Fisto / Sy-Klone / Moss Man / Lizard Man / Trap Jaw / Tri-Klops / Kobra Khan / Clawful / Attak Trak / Jitsu / Spikor / Two Bad / Modulok / Various voices	Voice role; 130 episodes
1985	He-Man and She-Ra: A Christmas Special	Orko / King Randor / Spirit/Swift Wind / Spikor / Two-Bad / Modulok / Kowl / Rattlor / Horde Prime / Multi-Bot / Monstroid / Father	Voice role; Television movie
1985–1987	She-Ra: Princess of Power	Spirit/Swift Wind / Kowl / Mantenna / Leech / Horde Troopers / Horde Prime / Light Hope / Broom / Grizzlor / Modulok / Multi-Bot / Orko / Various voices	Voice role; 93 episodes
1986	Ghostbusters	Tracy the Gorilla / Sir Trance-A-Lot / Ansabone / Skelevision / Fuddy / Various voices	Voice role; 65 episodes
1987–1988	BraveStarr	Sandstorm / Hog-Tie / Two-Face / Goldtooth / Howler / Dingo Dan / Barker / Diamondback / Doc Clayton / Fleeder's Father	Voice role; 64 episodes
1995	The Ark Angels	Various voices	Voice role; 4 episodes

=== Discography ===
Year	Title	Role	Notes
1976	The U.S. of Archie	Mandan Indian	Record produced in 1976
1977	Halloween Starring Fat Albert and the Cosby Kids	Dumb Donald / Clerk / Sci-Fi Movie Actor	Record produced in 1977

== Filmmaking credits ==
Year	Title	Producer	Executive producer	Notes
1966	The New Adventures of Superman	Yes	No	4 episodes
1967	Journey to the Center of the Earth	Yes	No	17 episodes
1967	The Superman/Aquaman Hour of Adventure	Yes	No	3 episodes
1967–1969	Aquaman	Yes	No	18 episodes
1968–1969	The Adventures of Batman	Yes	No	3 episodes
1968–1969	Fantasic Voyage	Yes	No	17 episodes
1968–1971	The Archie Show	Yes	No	Aka Archie's Funhouse
1969	Archie and His New Pals	Yes	No	Television movie
1969–1971	The Hardy Boys	Yes	No	
1969–1972	Sabrina the Teenage Witch	Yes	No	61 episodes
1970	Will the Real Jerry Lewis Please Sit Down	Yes	No	Episode: "Computer Suitor"
1970	Groovie Goolies	Yes	No	16 episodes
1971	Aesop's Fables	Yes	No	Television movie
1971	Archie's TV Funnies	Yes	No	16 episodes
1972	Journey Back to Oz	Yes	No	
1972	The ABC Saturday Superstar Movie	Yes	No	3 episodes
1972–1973	The Brady Kids	Yes	No	22 episodes
1972–1973	Lassie's Rescue Rangers	Yes	No	16 episodes
1973	Treasure Island	Yes	No	
1973	My Favorite Martians	Yes	No	16 episodes
1973	Mission: Magic!	Yes	No	16 episodes
1973–1974	Star Trek: The Animated Series	Yes	No	22 episodes
1974	Oliver Twist	Yes	No	
1974	The U.S. of Archie	Yes	No	16 episodes
1974–1975	The New Adventures of Gilligan	No	Yes	24 episodes
1974–1976	Shazam!	No	Yes	28 episodes
1975	The Secret Lives of Waldo Kitty	Yes	No	13 episodes
1975	The Ghost Busters	No	Yes	15 episodes
1975	Wacky and Packy	Yes	No	Episodes: "The New York Sweats"
1975–1976	Uncle Croc's Block	No	Yes	
1975–1976	The Secrets of Isis	No	Yes	22 episodes
1976	Ark II	No	Yes	15 episodes
1976–1979	Tarzan, Lord of the Jungle	No	Yes	36 episodes
1977	The New Adventures of Batman	Yes	No	16 episodes
1977	The New Archie and Sabrina Hour	No	Yes	
1977	The Fat Albert Halloween Special	Yes	No	Television movie
1977	Space Sentinels	No	Yes	13 episodes
1977	Space Academy	No	Yes	15 episodes
1977	The Fat Albert Christmas Special	Yes	No	Television movie
1977–1978	Sabrina, Super Witch	Yes	No	
1977–1978	Archie's Bang-Shang Lalapalooza Show	Yes	No	
1978	The Freedom Force	No	Yes	5 episodes
1978	Fabulous Funnies	No	Yes	13 episodes
1978–1979	Tarzan and the Super 7	No	Yes	33 episodes
1978–1979	Jason of Star Command	No	Yes	28 episodes
1979	The New Adventures of Mighty Mouse and Heckle and Jeckle	No	Yes	
1979–1982	The New Adventures of Flash Gordon	No	Yes	24 episodes
1979–1985	Fat Albert and the Cosby Kids	Yes	Yes	5 episodes
1980–1981	Sport Billy	No	Yes	26 episodes
1980	A Snow White Christmas	No	Yes	Television movie
1980	The Tom and Jerry Comedy Show	Yes	No	
1980–1982	The Tarzan/Lone Ranger/Zorro Adventure Hour	Yes	No	28 episodes
1981	Blackstar	Yes	No	13 episodes
1981	The New Adventures of Zorro	Yes	No	13 episodes
1981–1982	The Kid Super Power Hour with Shazam!	No	Yes	
1981–1982	Hero High	No	Yes	
1982	The Fat Albert Easter Special	Yes	No	Television movie
1982	Flash Gordon: The Greatest Adventure of All	No	Yes	Television movie
1982	Mighty Mouse in the Great Space Chase	Yes	No	
1982	Gilligan's Planet	No	Yes	13 episodes
1983–1985	He-Man and the Masters of the Universe	No	Yes	130 episodes
1985	He-Man and She-Ra: The Secret of the Sword	No	Yes	
1985	He-Man & She-Ra: A Christmas Special	No	Yes	Television movie
1985–1987	She-Ra: Princess of Power	No	Yes	93 episodes
1986	Ghostbusters	No	Yes	65 episodes
1987	Pinocchio and the Emperor of the Night	Yes	No	
1987–1988	BraveStarr	Yes	No	65 episodes
1988	BraveStarr: The Legend	Yes	No	
1989	Town Musicians of Bremen	Yes	No	
1989	Happily Ever After	Yes	No	
2000	Robin and the Dreamweavers	Yes	No	
