= Lassie's Rescue Rangers =

- Genre: Children's animation
- Directed by: Hal Sutherland
- Voices of: Ted Knight; Jane Webb; Keith Sutherland; Erika Scheimer; Lane Scheimer
- Composers: Yvette Blais; Jeff Michael
- Country of origin: United States
- Original language: English
- No. of seasons: 1
- No. of episodes: 16 (list of episodes)

Production
- Producer: Norm Prescott; Lou Scheimer
- Running time: 22–24 minutes
- Production companies: Filmation Associates; Wrather Productions (as Wrather Corp.)

Original release
- Network: ABC
- Release: September 15 – December 22, 1973

Lassie's Rescue Rangers is an American animated television series produced by Filmation and featuring Lassie, running from 1972 to 1973. The hour-long pilot, Lassie and the Spirit of Thunder Mountain, was part of The ABC Saturday Superstar Movie.

== Summary ==
In the series, Lassie the collie lives near Thunder Mountain with the Turner family. Ranger Ben Turner (voiced by Ted Knight) works with wife Laura (voiced by Jane Webb) and children Susan (voiced by Erika Scheimer), Jackie (voiced by Lane Scheimer), and Ben Jr. (voiced by Keith Sutherland) as the Forest Force, a ranger-rescue team that protects Thunder Mountain National Park. Lassie is the leader of the Rescue Rangers, a group of wild animals living in the park, working alongside the Turners to help protect the environment and keep it safe for visitors.

The Rescue Rangers were eight animals including Groucho the owl, Toothless the mountain lion, Musty the skunk, and Robbie the raccoon. Also helping the Forest Force was Gene Fox (voiced by Lane Scheimer), a Native American, who was Ben Jr.'s, Jackie's and Susan's friend. Lassie herself and Toothless are the only animals who appeared in every episode. Also, Laura Turner was absent from "Lassie's Special Assignment," "The Impostors," and "The Sunken Galleon."

== Reception ==
The sixteen-episode season was not well received. Lassie's trainer, Rudd Weatherwax, said, "That's not Lassie. That's trash." The National Association of Broadcasters agreed: "The manufacturers of this rubbish have incorporated violence, crime and stupidity into what is probably the worst show for children of the season."

== Episode list ==
No.	Title	Original release date
1	"Lassie and the Spirit of Thunder Mountain"	November 11, 1972
Lassie, the Turner family, Gene Fox, and a small group of animals oppose Aaron Lipton's plan to build property on a reservation.
2	"The Animals Are Missing"	September 15, 1973
All the animals are captured by drug traffickers who need them to retrieve heroin from a dangerous subterranean area.
3	"Mystic Monster"	September 22, 1973
Something has crash landed in the woods. Could it be a visitor from outer space?
4	"Lassie's Special Assignment"	September 29, 1973
The rescue animals risk everything to rescue an imprisoned medical doctor when an epidemic threatens the public at large.
5	"The Imposters"	October 6, 1973
A mad scientist has created robot duplicates of the whole Rescue Rangers team, and sent them out to rob banks.
6	"Deadly Cargo"	October 13, 1973
The team discovers that the couple they rescued from a plane crash were transporting explosives.
7	"Grizzly"	October 20, 1973
The Rescue Rangers return a grizzly bear named King to the wild. Having been raised in captivity, will he be able to adjust to his new surroundings?
8	"Deepsea Disaster"	October 27, 1973
Jackie, Susan, Gene Fox, Lassie, Toothless, and Fastback are assigned as the crew of the Aquabase. But will a disgruntled sub designer have his revenge?
9	"Black Out"	November 3, 1973
The team heads into the city during a blackout to stop looters and other threats.
10	"Arctic Adventure"	November 10, 1973
This adventure focuses on the search for firefighters in Alaska.
11	"The Sunken Galleon"	November 17, 1973
Jackie, Susan, and Gene Fox search for a missing frogman in Clinton Inlet, unaware that two men have set their sights on a fortune in gold bars.
12	"Goldmine"	November 24, 1973
A greedy man mistakenly believes the Rescue Rangers are trying to steal gold from his mine.
13	"Rodeo"	December 1, 1973
Someone is trying to sabotage a rodeo. Note: One of the rodeo stars is a man named Ted Knight. Ted Knight was the voice of Ben Turner, Sr.
14	"Hullabaloo in Hollywood"	December 8, 1973
The Rescue Rangers arrive in Hollywood to appear in a movie. But a mysterious phantom is causing problems on the set.
15	"Tidal Wave"	December 15, 1973
The Rescue Rangers have their work cut out for them when a tidal wave threatens to devastate the Florida coast. Note: Jackie references Joni Mitchell's "Big Yellow Taxi" when the Rescue Rangers arrive at the Everglades.
16	"Lost"	December 22, 1973
Duane Johnson gets lost on his first camping trip, putting himself and a mountain man called Jake in terrible danger.
