= The Brown Hornet =

- Genre: Cartoon science fiction Superhero parody
- Created by: Bill Cosby
- Voices of: Bill Cosby
- Country of origin: United States

Production
- Executive producer: Bill Cosby
- Production company: Filmation

Original release
- Network: CBS (1972–1984); First-Run Syndication (1984-1985)

The Brown Hornet is a show-within-a-show (or more accurately, a cartoon-within-a-cartoon), which is a spin-off on the Filmation animated series Fat Albert and the Cosby Kids from 1979 to approximately 1985. The Brown Hornet was a show that Fat Albert's gang watched on a barely working television in their clubhouse. Originally the Brown Hornet was presented on a radio program by Cosby as an African-American version of the Green Hornet. During the cartoon the character was re-imagined as a caped and masked space hero.

The Brown Hornet was a golden-garbed black superhero who traveled the universe and always seemed to thwart the evil-doers and teach viewers a lesson in the process. In each opening, the Hornet and his two masked sidekicks, his big and bumbling pink-clad pal Stinger and their little white robot Tweeterbell, were facing certain doom aboard their hornet-shaped spaceship until the hero used one of his superpowers to save them all, usually with a snap of his white-gloved fingers. Their victory would be fleeting, however, as the episode would often end with a new threat emerging.

In the Fat Albert episode entitled "Video Mania", Weird Harold is seen playing a Brown Hornet arcade cabinet at a video arcade. In another episode, Fat Albert and his friends make their own Brown Hornet movie to submit to a film festival. The Brown Hornet also features prominently in The Fat Albert Easter Special (1982) where the Brown Hornet teaches Fat Albert and his friends the spirit of giving and rejuvenation.

== Inspiration ==
The Brown Hornet's name is a play on the name of the old time radio hero The Green Hornet. In fact, Bill Cosby had done a syndicated radio Brown Hornet series around 1970 that directly parodied the old program and serials and the hardboiled detective genre in general as the hapless hero drove around in his "very fast car" the White Beauty having myriad misadventures with his hoarse-whispering sidekick Leroy and his pet dog Weaver.

== Fictional theatrical film ==
The fictional film The Brown Hornet: The Great Galaxy World Adventure Movie was featured in the 2004 film Fat Albert.

== Voice cast ==
The Brown Hornet - Bill Cosby

Stinger - Lou Scheimer

Tweeterbell - Erika Scheimer

Announcer - Norm Prescott/Lou Scheimer

== Other media ==
The Brown Hornet appeared in the South Park episode "Imaginationland."

Black Thought of the hip hop band The Roots mentions the Brown Hornet in the lyrics to Thought @ Work.

Appeared as Bill Cosby's henchmen in the Black Dynamite episode "'Sweet Bill's Badass Singalong Song' or 'Bill Cosby Ain't Himself'".

In the 1976 Fox comedy movie Mother, Jugs and Speed, Bill Cosby introduces himself to Harvey Keitel as the Brown Hornet.
