= Ark II =

- Title card
- Genre: Science fiction
- Created by: Ted Post; Martin Roth
- Starring: Terry Lester; Jean Marie Hon; José Flores; Moochie the chimpanzee; (owned and trained by Darrell Keener)
- Composers: Yvette Blais; Jeff Michael
- Country of origin: United States
- Original language: English
- No. of seasons: 1
- No. of episodes: 15

Production
- Executive producers: Norm Prescott; Lou Scheimer
- Producer: Richard M. Rosenbloom
- Camera setup: Single-camera
- Running time: 22–24 minutes (without commercials); 30 minutes (with commercials)
- Production company: Filmation

Original release
- Network: CBS
- Release: September 11 – December 18, 1976

Related
- Space Academy

Ark II is an American live-action science fiction television series, aimed at children, that aired on CBS from September 11 to December 18, 1976, (with reruns continuing through November 13, 1977 and reruns returning from September 16, 1978, through August 25, 1979) as part of its weekend line-up. Only 15 half-hour episodes were produced. The program's central characters were created by Martin Roth; Ted Post helped Roth develop its core format.

== Series overview ==
The opening titles for each episode, as narrated first by executive producer Lou Scheimer (using his then uncredited pseudonym Erik Gunden), then by the voice of Terry Lester, who portrayed Jonah, summarized the show's backstory:

For millions of years, Earth was fertile and rich. Then pollution and waste began to take their toll. Civilization fell into ruin. This is the world of the 25th century. Only a handful of scientists remain, men who have vowed to rebuild what has been destroyed. This is their achievement: Ark II, a mobile storehouse of scientific knowledge, manned by a highly trained crew of young people. Their mission: to bring the hope of a new future to mankind.

(Voice of Jonah): Ark II log, entry number 1. I, Jonah,...Ruth,...Samuel,...and Adam are fully aware of the dangers we face as we venture into unknown, maybe even hostile, areas. But we’re determined to bring the promise of a new civilization to our people and our planet.

Ark II had a racially mixed cast starring Terry Lester as Ark II's commander, Jonah, Jean Marie Hon as Ruth, José Flores as Samuel, and a chimpanzee named Moochie (owned and trained by Darrell Keener) responding to the name of Adam and voiced by Lou Scheimer. The show's premise was inspired by the story of Noah's Ark, and the characters were given names taken from the Hebrew Bible. It was set in a post-apocalyptic 25th century (specifically, 2476, the show having debuted in 1976), after Earth's civilizations had been decimated by the effects of waste, pollution, and warfare, falling back to a civilization comparable to the Dark Ages. The surviving scientists pooled their knowledge and resources, training three young people (and the chimp, who was capable of speech and abstract reasoning) to search for remnants of humanity, reintroducing lost ideas as they traveled the barren landscape in the high-tech Ark II.

The show mentions a "headquarters" and that the crew are scientists. The titles "commander" and "captain" are both used to refer to Jonah. All the installments began and ended with numbered entries in the Ark II's log, which Lester, in character as Jonah, narrated in voiceover. Like other Filmation shows, Ark II also had a moral lesson derived from the preceding events seen in the episode. However, the epilogue log entry narrated by Jonah is used to deliver the moral rather than have any of the characters break the fourth wall (i.e. speak directly to the camera and TV viewers) to deliver the moral which was common in most Filmation shows.

== Cast ==
- Terry Lester as Jonah
- Jean Marie Hon as Ruth
- José Flores as Samuel
- Moochie (chimpanzee) as Adam

== Production ==
In "The Launch of Ark II," the documentary filmed for the release of the DVD set, Lou Scheimer and others mention that the program was filmed during the summer of 1976 predominantly on location at Paramount Ranch near Malibu, California. Establishing-footage of the Ark traveling at high speed was shot at the Rogers Dry Lake bed at Edwards Air Force Base. The show was filmed at a rate of two episodes per week.

According to Lou Scheimer, Moochie the chimpanzee was very angry and aggressive as a result of mistreatment by his trainer, sometimes witnessed by the cast and crew.

== Technology ==
The series is best-remembered for the "Ark II" vehicle: a futuristic-looking six-wheeled combination RV and mobile laboratory. The 44 ft long vehicle was a fiberglass body on a 1971 Ford C-Series (C-700) cabover, by the Brubaker Group. It is sometimes incorrectly reported that the Ark II vehicle was built by Dean Jeffries, who constructed various fantastic vehicles for science-fiction films and television. These include the Landmaster for the film Damnation Alley, with which the Ark II is sometimes confused. The front end of the Ark II prop was later used as the nose portion of the Seeker spacecraft in the Filmation series Space Academy and Jason of Star Command.

In addition, the series also featured a jetpack called the "Jet Jumper", and the "Ark Roamer", a smaller, 4-wheeled all-terrain vehicle built by Brubaker from a modified Brubaker Box, a kit car using a 1968 Volkswagen Beetle sedan chassis. The Ark Roamer was carried in the rear of the Ark II.

== Guest stars ==
Guest stars included Jonathan Harris, Malachi Throne, Jim Backus, Geoffrey Lewis, Philip Abbott, Robert Ridgely, Helen Hunt, and Robby the Robot as the title character built by Samuel in the episode "The Robot." Helen Hunt appears in the episode "Omega." Actor Daniel Selby auditioned for the role of Samuel, but Jose Flores won the role.

== Episodes ==
No.	Title	Directed by	Written by	Original release date
1	"The Flies"	Ted Post	Martin Roth	September 11, 1976
A group of feral children, led by a modern-day Fagin, finds ancient canisters of poison gas, but encounters both the Ark II crew and very unruly barbarians.
2	"The Slaves"	Hollingsworth Morse	David Dworski	September 18, 1976
Jonah is captured by a local baron while scouting a village, but is the baron really a magician?
3	"The Wild Boy"	Hollingsworth Morse	Susan Dworski	September 25, 1976
The crew of the Ark II befriend a feral young man who tries to scare the Ark II travelers away from a cave of glowing crystals...
4	"The Robot"	Ted Post	Chuck Menville & Len Janson	October 2, 1976
Samuel constructs a robot with limited artificial intelligence. But the robot doesn't want to be shut down and escapes. Now Samuel and Jonah must find it...
5	"Omega"	Hollingsworth Morse	Bill Danch & Jim Ryan	October 9, 1976
The Ark II's crew discovers an enclave enslaved by a rogue artificial intelligence, and they must take on its challenge to defeat it.
6	"The Tank"	Ted Post	Story by : Mark Jones & Michael Prescott; Teleplay by : Mark Jones & Michael Prescott & Robert Specht	October 16, 1976
A woman is kidnapped by a band of scavengers after she ventures into a valley filled with machines... and with help from the crew of Ark II and her crew, the tank is found...
7	"The Cryogenic Man"	Ted Post	Martin Roth	October 23, 1976
Two cryogenically frozen men are revived, but when they start anew their business, they soon realize problems from the past follow them into the future!
8	"The Rule"	Ted Post	Martin Roth	October 30, 1976
The team comes across a settlement which has discarded the elderly and the weak.
9	"Robin Hood"	Hollingsworth Morse	Len Janson & Chuck Menville	November 6, 1976
The team must stop a war between a village lord and a modern-day Robin Hood.
10	"The Drought"	Ted Post	Martin Roth	November 13, 1976
The feral children from episode 101 return to steal the Ark.
11	"The Lottery"	Ted Post	Phyllis White & Robert White	November 20, 1976
The team encounter a community of "grasshoppers" as seen in The Ant and the Grasshopper.
12	"The Mind Group"	Hollingsworth Morse	Robert Specht	November 27, 1976
The team runs afoul of a group of barbarians while encountering five psionic children.
13	"The Balloon"	Hollingsworth Morse	Story by : Peter L. Dixon; Teleplay by : Peter L. Dixon & Robert Specht	December 4, 1976
The team evacuates a plague-stricken village using a hot air balloon.
14	"Don Quixote"	Ted Post	Robert Specht & Len Janson	December 11, 1976
A "modern" Don Quixote believes that the Ark vehicle is a dragon.
15	"Orkus"	Henry J. Lange Jr.	Robert Specht & Chuck Menville	December 18, 1976
After discovering a community of self-styled "immortals", members of the crew begin to age rapidly.

== Home media ==
BCI Eclipse LLC (under its Ink & Paint classic animation entertainment brand), under a license it had obtained from Entertainment Rights, released Ark II: The Complete Series on DVD in Region 1 on November 7, 2006. The BCI Eclipse 4-disc set included many special features, and the episodes were presented uncut and presented in their original production order. Surviving masters are PAL video transfers, and as such they run approximately 4% fast compared to the original film elements, with an accompanying rise in the pitch of the audio.

Unlike many of the in-house Filmation DVD releases in Region 1 by BCI Entertainment’s Ink & Paint brand, this series was sourced from the original NTSC film elements, with correct speed and pitch.

Savor Ediciones, S.A. released Ark II: La Serie Completa as a 4-disc Region 2 DVD box set on May 20, 2009. Unlike the BCI set, this release only contains the episodes, no bonus features. Being a Region 2 release for Spain, the soundtrack is the dubbed Spanish version. Unfortunately, the original English soundtrack was not included, even as a secondary option. The discs are encoded in the PAL video format.
