= Pinocchio and the Emperor of the Night =

1987 US animated film directed by Hal Sutherland

- Theatrical release poster
- Directed by: Hal Sutherland
- Written by: Robby London; Barry O'Brien; Dennis O'Flaherty
- Based on: The Adventures of Pinocchio by Carlo Collodi
- Produced by: Lou Scheimer
- Starring: Ed Asner; Lana Beeson; Tom Bosley; Linda Gary; Scott Grimes; Jonathan Harris; James Earl Jones; Rickie Lee Jones; Don Knotts; Frank Welker; William Windom
- Edited by: Rick Gehr; Jeffrey C. Patch
- Music by: (score); Brian Banks; Anthony Marinelli; (original songs); Barry Mann; Will Jennings; Steve Tyrell
- Production company: Filmation
- Distributed by: New World Pictures
- Release dates: December 25, 1987 (North America); June 15, 1990 (Great Britain)
- Running time: 87 minutes
- Country: United States
- Language: English
- Budget: $10 million
- Box office: $3 million

Pinocchio and the Emperor of the Night is a 1987 American animated fantasy adventure film that was released on December 25, 1987, by New World Pictures. Created by Filmation, the film was conceived as a sequel to the 1883 Italian classic novel The Adventures of Pinocchio by Carlo Collodi, being set a year after Pinocchio became a real boy. It was also described by some as a "thinly-veiled" sequel to Disney's 1940 classic Pinocchio. Disney sued Filmation for copyright infringement, but Filmation argued that Collodi's work is in the public domain. Ultimately, the case was settled out of court on terms that were kept confidential.

The film received generally negative reviews from critics during its initial release and underperformed at the box office, costing $10 million but making $3.2 million in its entire run.

== Plot ==
A bumblebee named Lieutenant Grumblebee is awakened by the arrival of a sinister sail-and-steamship. Its owner, the puppet-master Puppetino, deems the spot ideal for a carnival, and Grumblebee flees as the circus tent is erected.

A year after being made human by his Fairy Godmother, Pinocchio celebrates his first birthday with Geppetto. The Good Fairy appears, teaches him that love is his most powerful gift, and brings to life one of his own carvings, a wooden glow-bug that becomes his conscience. The bug takes the name "Willikers" after Pinocchio's surprised exclamation. After the party, Pinocchio offers to deliver a jewel box to the mayor for Geppetto. En route, he encounters con men Sylvester J. Scalawag the raccoon and Igor the monkey, who trick him into trading the box for a fake "Pharaoh's Ruby". Geppetto is furious, and Pinocchio flees in shame, leaving Willikers behind.

Pinocchio looks for work at the carnival and is entranced by a blonde marionette named Twinkle. Puppetino recognizes Pinocchio and uses Twinkle to lure him into joining the carnival. Puppetino plays an organ grinder that causes Pinocchio to dance uncontrollably and slowly transforms him back into a puppet, and Puppetino hangs the now lifeless Pinocchio alongside Twinkle. The Good Fairy awakens Pinocchio, explains that he lost his freedom by taking it for granted, and reminds him of the importance of choice before restoring him to human form.

Deciding to retrieve the jewel box, Pinocchio sets off alone despite Willikers's objection. Willikers encounters Grumblebee, who takes him to his home in Bugzburg. Pinocchio encounters Scalawag and Igor, who claim the box is on the carnival ship. The trio pursue the carnival ship by boat, while the con men secretly plan to sell Pinocchio to Puppetino. However, they abandon this plan and befriend Pinocchio after he saves them from a giant barracuda. The carnival ship arrives and captures the boat. Willikers, carried to the river by Grumblebee, latches onto Pinocchio's pocket as they are swept inside.

Scalawag recognizes the ship as the Empire of the Night. A gondolier offers Pinocchio a ride to the jewel box, leaving Scalawag and Igor behind. Pinocchio, attracted by a brighter path, directs the ship to the "Neon Cabaret". He impulsively signs the doorman's contract for entry, and finds a room full of partying children. He drinks from a fountain of green liquid that causes him to hallucinate and black out. He awakens on a stage and is urged by a ringmaster to perform. Scalawag and Igor try to get his attention, but are drawn offstage while he is distracted by Twinkle. Pinocchio bows to thunderous applause.

Puppetino appears, and the gondolier, doorman, and ringmaster are revealed to be successive guises of the Emperor of the Night. He tells Pinocchio that he has reached the "Land Where Dreams Come True" and that the audience was made up of puppets who were once real children. He demands Pinocchio's signature, which will make him a puppet again and drain the Good Fairy's life. Pinocchio refuses and is imprisoned with Scalawag and Igor. The Emperor reveals that Geppetto has been shrunk to fit inside the jewel box. Pinocchio signs the contract to free the others, transforming back into a living puppet.

Pinocchio escapes with his friends while the Emperor blasts Puppetino for his cowardice. Puppetino turns into a lifeless puppet and burns. As the Emperor threatens to make Geppetto pay for Pinocchio's choices, Pinocchio is enveloped by the light of the Good Fairy. The Emperor shoots bolts of flame at Pinocchio, but the blue light protects him as the ship catches fire. Pinocchio becomes a blue shining orb and plunges into the Emperor, destroying him and his ship.

On the shore, Geppetto has returned to his original size. Scalawag and Igor find Pinocchio, who is once again a real boy. The Good Fairy appears, proudly telling Pinocchio that he no longer needs her. She presents the jewel box to Geppetto and reveals the now human Twinkle awakening nearby before fading away to the sunrise, leaving the group to celebrate.

== Cast ==
- Scott Grimes as Pinocchio
- James Earl Jones as The Emperor of the Night
- Don Knotts as Gee Willikers, an anthropomorphic glow-bug
- Tom Bosley as Mister Geppetto, Pinocchio's "father"
- Rickie Lee Jones as The Good Fairy, Pinocchio's fairy godmother
- Ed Asner as Sylvester J. Scalawag, an anthropomorphic raccoon and a trickster
- Frank Welker as Igor, an anthropomorphic monkey, a thief and Scalawag's sidekick
- Lana Beeson as Twinkle, a female puppet
- Linda Gary as Bee-Atrice, an anthropomorphic female bumblebee
- Jonathan Harris as Lieutenant Grumblebee, an anthropomorphic male bumblebee and lieutenant of the RAB ("Royal Air Bugs")
- William Windom as Puppetino, an evil puppet-master

== Release ==
=== Critical reception ===
The movie received generally negative reviews from critics during its initial release.

Writing for the Chicago Tribune, Dave Kehr labelled it a "wooden effort" and concluded there was "little reason to bother with Pinocchio and the Emperor of the Night given that the genuine article is readily available on videotape".

Janet Maslin of the New York Times called it "Saturday morning animation at best" and also compared it unfavorably with Disney's version.

Charles Solomon of the Los Angeles Times wrote that the script and direction lacked focus and felt the movie "illustrates just how badly the American animated feature has degenerated". The Boston Herald reviewed the film, stating, "The creators at Filmation have been churning out animated garbage for 25 years, and nobody has been able to get rid of them."

Juan Carlos Coto praised the performances of Rickie Lee Jones and James Earl Jones, but felt the plot was mostly "Saturday-morning rehash" and also urged readers to watch the Disney movie instead.

Leonard Maltin seemed to agree, declaring that "Some striking animation is wasted on this uninspired 'sequel' to Disney's 1940 gem...Even at its best, this is an embarrassment compared to Uncle Walt's predecessor."

The Morning Call's reviewer was more favorable, opining that "it does dazzle and sparkle in all the right places", adding "there is much to recommend the new film". M. J. Simpson praised the "engaging story, likeable characters... genuine tension and horror, reasonable songs and... terrific animation" and gave it a B+ rating.

Pinocchio and the Emperor of the Night was described as a "thinly veiled sequel" to Disney's 1940 classic Pinocchio; one reviewer noted its many similarities to the original and imagined "legions of lawyers poring over every frame". Disney sued Filmation for copyright infringement, but lost after Filmation successfully argued that Carlo Collodi's characters were in the public domain.

=== Box office ===
The film opened on Christmas in 1987 in 1,182 theaters, and made $602,734 on its opening weekend for an average of $510 per theater, 18.48% percent of the final gross of $3,261,638 in the United States.

== Songs ==
All lyrics are written by Will Jennings.

No.	Title	Writer(s)	Performer(s)	Length
1.	"Love is the Light Inside Your Heart"	Barry Mann	Rickie Lee Jones
2.	"You're a Star"	Will Jennings	Kid Creole and the Coconuts
3.	"Do What Makes You Happy"	Steve Tyrell	Lana Beeson
4.	"Neon Cabaret"	Anthony Marinelli & Brian Banks	Anthony Marinelli & Brian Banks

== Availability ==
There are currently no DVD releases of this film in North America as of 2026. However, it is available to view on streaming channels like Amazon Prime and Pluto TV for free.
