= List of Fat Albert and the Cosby Kids episodes =

Fat Albert and the Cosby Kids is an animated television series about the adventures of African American children growing up in North Philadelphia in the 1970s, created by comedian Bill Cosby. It was broadcast on CBS for eight non-consecutive seasons between 1972 and 1985. Starting in 1979, it was called The New Fat Albert Show. A total of 110 episodes were produced, including episodes of Adventures of Fat Albert and the Cosby Kids created for syndication during its final year. The series' introduction of educational themes in an animated format was groundbreaking for its time.

== Series overview ==
Season	Episodes	Originally released	
Season	Episodes	First released	Last released
1	14	September 9, 1972	December 9, 1972
2	8	September 8, 1973	October 27, 1973
3	6	September 6, 1975	October 11, 1975
4	8	September 11, 1976	October 30, 1976
5	8	September 8, 1979	October 27, 1979
6	8	September 6, 1980	October 25, 1980
7	8	September 18, 1982	November 13, 1982
8	50	September 1, 1984	August 10, 1985
Specials	5	12 November 1969	3 April 1982

== Episodes ==
=== Season 1 (1972) ===
No. overall	No. in season	Title	Original release date
1	1	"Lying"	September 9, 1972
The gang's friend Edward tells stories about wrestling with alligators when he was in Florida. So the gang goes down to the nearest pond so he can demonstrate his techniques. They find a lot of mud, but no gators. Edward tells them how to lie to their parents to avoid punishment. The next day, Edward brags that he's a good swimmer, but his young cousin informs the gang he really can't swim. He gets busted when they try to make him to dive in the pool and is eventually forced to come clean. The gang forgives him, but assure him next time he lies, they'll clobber him.
2	2	"The Runt"	September 16, 1972
The gang's little friend Peewee is short and feels left out of most activities, especially sports. They're later challenged by a rival gang in a game of football. It turns out Peewee is a good kicker and the gang allows him to participate in the game, but their rivals have a secret weapon of their own in the form of Kong, a strong guy who's even bigger than Fat Albert. During the high-scoring game, the ball is lost in a building and it's up to Peewee to retrieve it since he's the only one small enough to get it. The gangs make peace and the rivals consider Peewee a cool kid after all, proving it's who you are that's important.
3	3	"The Stranger"	September 23, 1972
Dumb Donald's young cousin Betty is visiting from down south, but the rest of the gang is far from welcoming to her. She's blamed for their getting detention after school, then causing a mess while they're cleaning up. Eventually, she warms up to them when she plays tennis against Rudy and beats him to their delight. The gang feels down after they're assigned to write a paper on King Arthur, but thanks to Betty, they get to use their imagination and don outfits as they act out various medieval roles, inspiring them to write their papers and get passing grades. The next day, the gang invites Betty to play with them at the junkyard as they become more accepting to her.
4	4	"Creativity"	September 30, 1972
Rudy brags to the gang that with his new electric guitar, he'll be able to achieve fame and fortune, delving into fantasy in the process. However, the rest of the group don't have instruments of their own and take on various jobs in efforts to earn the money. They're far short in their funding as the instruments at the store are quite expensive, which costs about $483.44. Rudy's dreams of fame are also out of sight as his electric guitar set blew out the electricity during the gig he was scheduled to perform. As a result, the gang find that they can make their own instruments from various items they find at the junkyard. With a little skill and fine tuning, the Junkyard Band makes its debut.
5	5	"Fish Out of Water"	October 7, 1972
The gang leaves the neighborhood for the first time to attend Camp Greenlane, where they are joined by a troop of scouts. At first, the two groups don't get along, distrusting each other due to the fact that the other group is "different". They attempt to get at each other with a series of escalating pranks, but when a homesick Russell runs away, he gets lost and everyone bands together to search for him. The two groups find him in danger and work together to rescue him in time. They eventually find new friends in each other, looking forward to meeting again for camp next year. The episode ends with a song telling us that despite our differences, we live in one world, with one kind of people, the Human Race.
6	6	"Moving"	October 14, 1972
The gang is challenged to a traditional game of Buck Buck by their rivals at the junkyard. In this game, each group take turns holding onto a pole in line formation while the other piles on top of them to see how much weight they can withstand. Fat Albert is underweight and Rudy suggests the gang provide him with their food to get him heavy enough to compete. But this strategy backfires as the rest of the gang is hungry and are too lightweight during their turn to crumple the other team. Although Fat Albert can make up the difference, he suffers from too much eating and must go home to recuperate, which marks the first time his gang is defeated. The rest vote to kick him out, but have a change of heart when they learn he's moving away. However, he's only moving to another place at the end of the block. The guys make up and continue their adventures together.
7	7	"Playing Hooky"	October 21, 1972
Bored with having to go to school every day, Fat Albert and the gang decide to play hooky the following day. All except Dumb Donald cut out for a day of fun activities, but get into a number of mishaps. They eventually end up at the train yards where they encounter a couple of homeless bums who often played hooky themselves, leading to their less than glamorous lifestyle. They advise the boys to stay in school before they end up the same way. The following morning, the gang is back at school, arriving much earlier than usual to catch up on their studies.
8	8	"The Hospital"	October 28, 1972
Bill takes his fearful younger brother Russell to the school doctor for an examination. To show how simple it is, he allows the doctor to examine him as well. To the brothers' dismay, they're scheduled to go to the hospital for a tonsillectomy. Fearing the worst, they decide to give away their most prized possessions to the rest of the gang before realizing it's a very routine surgery. Their fears are further lifted when their parents tell them they'll be getting ice cream once the surgery's over. When the rest of the gang visit the hospital, they try to sneak in so they can get some dessert as well.
9	9	"Begging Benny"	November 4, 1972
Fat Albert's cousin Benny comes to visit, but quickly wears out his welcome with the gang by repeatedly taking advantage of them. Eventually, he gets a taste of his own medicine when a group of punks treats him the same way he treated Fat Albert and the gang. Afterward, Benny learns about the true value of friendship.
10	10	"The Hero"	November 11, 1972
The gang looks up to Scrap Iron Yates, thinking he's cool, but he does the opposite, always looking down on them. First, he invites them to join him at the pool hall, but when the manager appears, claims he never did, realizing they shouldn't be there to begin with because they're underage. Later, he makes some of the gang pay him to ride on his motorcycle. When his reckless driving gets the attention of a police officer, he tries to convince him they stole his motorcycle. But Scrap Iron's claims begin to go up in smoke as he doesn't have the proper vehicle registration, let alone a valid driver's license. As a result, Russell stops his getaway, making him face the music and the gang sees for sure he's no real hero.
11	11	"The Prankster"	November 18, 1972
Otis is a new guy whose various pranks have the gang amused to the point where they approve of his joining them. Fat Albert, who's not amused, decides to quit the gang. Afterward, when Otis pranks a rival gang, he gets the gang in trouble when they challenge them to a fight. Otis' efforts to prepare the gang for the fight only leads to more pranks, leaving Fat Albert to bail Otis out by convincing the rivals into allowing his pranks to turn against him, giving them a few laughs as well.
12	12	"Four Eyes"	November 25, 1972
The gang thinks Heywood is the goofiest person they know since he has difficulty playing sports with them. But his difficulties continue at school as he has trouble reading as well. His teacher and principal send him to an optometrist for an eye exam. Heywood learns he needs glasses and fears being ridiculed, but afterward, shows the gang up with his greatly improved reading and athletic skills.
13	13	"The Tomboy"	December 2, 1972
While the gang takes interest in the homemade fudge Fat Albert made for their teacher, a new girl in class named Penny surprises them in her desire to play sports. She's able to show them up in football, basketball, weightlifting, pole vaulting, and even arm wrestling, but they still have difficulty accepting her abilities. When Penny's friend suggests she should try more domestic work, she finds herself challenging Fat Albert in a baking contest. Despite the odds, Fat Albert wins. Afterward, Penny and the gang get along as she helps them with their tennis game.
14	14	"Stagefright"	December 9, 1972
The gang takes interest in a drama club and want to perform in a play in hopes of winning a money prize. After bungled efforts to perform William Tell at the junkyard, they decide to do a performance of Moby Dick once they reach the theater. Their instructor does all she can to get them organized. After Rudy performs a soliloquy of King Arthur on the night of the drama competition, the rest of the gang's performance of Moby Dick flops as stagefright gets the better of them. But they're relieved afterward because Rudy, the winner, gets the prize of free ballet lessons from the instructor.

=== Season 2 (1973) ===
No. overall	No. in season	Title	Original release date
1	15	"The Bully"	September 8, 1973
Whenever Fat Albert isn't around, Slappy bullies the rest of the gang around, but is careful to be on his best behavior whenever he does appear. It takes a while, but Bill is able to prove to Fat Albert about Slappy's true character. After he confronts him, Slappy promises not to bully the gang again.
2	16	"Smart Kid"	September 15, 1973
Thurman does so well in his studies that he usually leaves his books behind after school. Fat Albert and the gang recently have had to stay in detention to make up for their failing grades. To cool off, they play their usual sports, for which Thurman shows little skill. The gang eventually learn that Thurman has his own set of books at home, proving that he always studies most evenings, leaving little time for sports. As a result, they work out a deal where Thurman tutors the gang so they can improve their grades and they reciprocate by helping him to work out to improve his athletic skills.
3	17	"Mr. Big Timer"	September 22, 1973
Frainey Bates' brother Muggles gives him money and a number of material things that he shares with the gang, including a motorcycle that eventually gets wrecked by Fat Albert. He personally goes to Muggles to do what he can to pay for it. Muggles gives Albert a package to deliver, eventually learning it contains narcotic drugs after he gets apprehended by the police, who determine he didn't know about the drugs. Fat Albert agrees to help them catch Muggles and arrest him to stop his drug dealing. While Frainey no longer acknowledges Fat Albert as a friend, the rest of the gang stick up for him, knowing he did the right thing to get illegal drugs off the streets.
4	18	"The Newcomer"	September 29, 1973
Dumb Donald gets the shock of his life when his parents tell him that they're going to have another baby, and the news isn't sitting well with him at all. The gang tries to help smooth things over for Donald by taking him to the zoo, but all that does is show him that animals have young of their own, leaving the gang wondering where babies come from. When Donald's new baby sister finally arrives, all his fears go away as he takes a quick liking to her even though he doesn't let the gang know that as yet.
5	19	"What Does Dad Do?"	October 6, 1973
For a class assignment, the gang has to write about what their fathers do for a living, but their teacher quickly figures out they're making up exaggerated stories about them. Afterward, she puts them on a special assignment where each of the gang is to accompany his father to his job to get a better understanding of what he does. This helps them to pass their assignment and better appreciate what their dads do for a living. The only exception is Mushmouth who ended up missing the bus to his dad's workplace.
6	20	"Mom or Pop"	October 13, 1973
The gang is interested in what their new classmate Flora has in her small pink bag. Eventually, they find out it's a toy puppy she got from her father, who has recently divorced her mother. The two continuously bicker over Flora while the gang helps to cheer her up at the junkyard. On her birthday, Flora's parents learn she's run away from home and put aside their differences as they desperately search for her. Fat Albert and the gang help and discover she went back to the junkyard to get away from her parents' arguing. The two agree that even though they won't be together anymore, Flora will be an important part of both their lives.
7	21	"How the West Was Lost"	October 20, 1973
Johnny is a new kid in school who's an American Indian from Arizona. The gang thinks that because Johnny is Indian that he can make a rainstorm and do other tricks that they've seen from movies. However, Johnny shows them that he's not the stereotypical Native American. Mudfoot tells an outrageous story about meeting an Indian, prompting the gang to go to the library to learn more about Native American peoples and cultures, and later treating Johnny with more respect when they see him again.
8	22	"Sign Off"	October 27, 1973
Cool Roy thinks it's cool to move and change street signs, as well as mark buildings with graffiti. Eventually, Fat Albert confronts him about how it can be dangerous and lead to trouble. Roy promises him he'll stop, but goes back on his word the next day while the gang is playing football; they lose their ball and Fat Albert saves Peewee in the nick of time after learning a nearby building is going to be demolished and all the danger signs were removed. Roy is caught with the evidence and must clean the graffiti off all the buildings he's defaced, teaching him a lesson.

=== Season 3 (1975) ===
No. overall	No. in season	Title	Original release date
1	23	"The Fuzz"	September 6, 1975
A guy named Parker has no respect for authority. He ruins a police stakeout, starts a false alarm with the fire department, and then convinces the gang to sneak by a security officer into a condemned amusement park, which leads to danger after getting trapped on an old roller coaster that's about to collapse. It's up to Parker and Fat Albert to get the authorities to mount a rescue. Afterward, the gang learns a valuable lesson about police authority.
2	24	"An Ounce of Prevention"	September 13, 1975
At times, the gang's friend Lucius seems to be a happy fun-loving guy, but other times he's down and forgetful, making them wonder what's wrong with him. Fat Albert eventually finds out he's been abusing alcohol. While Rudy and the gang try to deal with Lucius in their own way, Fat Albert and his parents meet with Lucius' folks, who already know about his drinking. They decide to confront him, working together to stop his abuse. After a couple of days, Lucius meets with Fat Albert, telling him he's dumped his liquor bottles, grateful his parents indeed care for him and thanking Albert for his concern.
3	25	"Fat Albert Meets Dan Cupid"	September 20, 1975
Fat Albert falls in love with his classmate Laverne, but is embarrassed when the rest of the gang butt in and tag along whenever he wants to be alone with her. Eventually, they go out to the movies together. Albert wants to spend even more time with Laverne, but she lets him down by saying they'd be better off as friends. The gang feels sorry for him after not seeing him for a couple of days, but see that he's back on his feet when he starts studying with another girl.
4	26	"Take 2, They're Small"	September 27, 1975
When Fat Albert's cousin Justin stays over for a while, he begins shoplifting from a local store. He's being influenced by the sleazy Harlow, who later tries to talk the gang into stealing a few things for him. They refuse, and after they see him trying to hassle Justin into stealing again, they give chase. Harlow gets away, but drops most of the items he's stolen, enabling the gang to return them to the police, who later arrest Harlow after they find more stolen items at his home. After his court appearance, Harlow is placed on probation, ensuring he won't influence Justin or other kids into stealing for him.
5	27	"Animal Lover"	October 4, 1975
Dulcie lets her dog Sanford free with no leash or collar. Fat Albert and the gang are concerned that Dulcie doesn't care what happens to him. Later, Sanford gets taken to the pound. Dulcie gets Sanford back and afterward, she tells her dog to chase the gang around town. She gets bitten by another dog who may have rabies. The gang searches for the other dog who bit Dulcie in hope they can have the dog checked out to ensure he's not ill.
6	28	"Little Tough Guy"	October 11, 1975
Dwayne is the new kid in school with an impaired foot, but Fat Albert and the gang try to treat him as an equal when he plays sports with them. However, it backfires and Dwayne loses confidence in himself. When the gang plays in an important football game, Dwayne is able to get his groove back and he returns to be the gang's placekicker and help win the game.

=== Season 4 (1976) ===
No. overall	No. in season	Title	Original release date
1	29	"Smoke Gets in Your Hair"	September 11, 1976
The gang's friend Wambly thinks it's cool to smoke. Rudy, and eventually the rest of the gang (except Fat Albert), begin to follow his example, which leads to trouble. Eventually, they get a hard lesson when Wambly's father (a cigar smoker) collapses during the gang's game. Afterward, father, son, and the rest of the gang, vow never to smoke again.
2	30	"What Say?"	September 18, 1976
Rudy likes Shanna but can't get her attention. The gang thinks Shanna's stuck up until Fat Albert figures out Shanna has a hearing problem, eventually convincing her to see a doctor for an examination. She eventually gets a hearing aid and Albert helps the gang to understand her situation.
3	31	"Readin', Ritin', and Rudy"	September 25, 1976
The gang gets Ms. Johnson, a new teacher, for their class. She wants them to treat her with the same respect as their old teacher and slowly, everyone begins to accept her, except Rudy, who continuously makes wisecracks and disrupts class to the point where she sends him to the vice-principal's office. Afterward, he decides to drop out of school. After encountering Mudfoot in the park, Rudy hears his story of how dropping out did not get him very far in life. Rudy reconsiders his decision, apologizes to Ms. Johnson, and returns to school.
4	32	"Suede Simpson"	October 2, 1976
Suede Simpson looks good, but smells bad. Fat Albert and the gang have difficulty trying to let him know he needs to practice good hygiene. But after he arrives uninvited to a party and repulses the girls, Suede gets a hard lesson from Russell. After a few days, he's back on the scene with the same girls, who are now walking alongside him now that he's cleaned up his act.
5	33	"Little Business"	October 9, 1976
The gang hopes to get a new bicycle at a low price via mail order, but learn the hard way that it's a systemic scam where they have to sell other items to get the bike, which itself is a broken-down lemon.
6	34	"TV or Not TV"	October 16, 1976
Monroe spends all his time watching TV to the point where he's not able to get proper sleep or do well in school. Meanwhile, the gang wants to perform a school play of Robin Hood to win tickets for a concert. But unfortunately, Monroe's TV addiction causes him to be late and prevents him for starring in the lead role. In spite of Fat Albert's efforts to get him on the stage, they're too late and another class wins the concert tickets. As a consolation, the gang is able to go to the concert after all since they at least showed up in time for the play. Because Monroe was late, he misses out, but is able to watch it on TV. However, he misses actually being on TV himself since Fat Albert and the gang are among those seen in the audience enjoying the concert.
7	35	"Shuttered Window"	October 23, 1976
When the school's sports budget is cut, jeopardizing all programs for the year, Undeen's Uncle Monty helps to organize a talent show to raise money. Before the big show, he suddenly dies, leaving the gang and Undeen deeply saddened. She particularly has a difficult time dealing with the loss. After some time and with help from her mother and Fat Albert, Undeen is able to move on and figures Uncle Monty should be remembered more for laughter than sadness and decides the talent show should go on after all to keep his memory alive.
8	36	"Junk Food"	October 30, 1976
Fat Albert and Slim Noodleton eat too much junk food, but after Slim gets a toothache, they go to the dentist where they are treated for cavities. The dentist recommends they follow a proper diet, but only Albert complies as he begins eating right and getting a newfound level of energy. However, Slim continues with the junk food diet and continues to suffer with low energy and stomach pains. Things get worse during a football game against a rival gang when Slim feels run down and plays poorly, leading to Fat Albert's team losing in the end. Afterward, Slim vows to take better care of his body and follow a more proper diet.

=== Season 5 (1979): The New Fat Albert Show ===
No. overall	No. in season	Title	Original release date
1	37	"In My Merry Busmobile"	September 8, 1979
The gang is bussed to an integrated school, finding it difficult to make new friends. After Fat Albert lectures them, he make an effort to break ground with Margene and Kevin with a game of badminton, eventually working together to have fun.
2	38	"The Dancer"	September 15, 1979
Fat Albert and the gang are in a boxing competition. They learn their new friend Dimitri is a ballet dancer and think he'd be too much of a sissy to join them, especially when one of them would have to compete against top boxer Slammin' Sandy for the championship. However, Dimitri easily proves them wrong by taking him on in the ring and utilizing his dance moves to get the better of Sandy, showing them that creatives arts indeed serve a purpose.
3	39	"Spare the Rod"	September 22, 1979
While jogging with the gang, Fat Albert becomes concerned when his friend Patrice has bruises on her body. He eventually discovers she's being abused by her mother. Fat Albert tries to convince her that she needs to tell someone. She's initially reluctant, but Fat Albert persists and she goes to her teacher and efforts are made to get Patrice the help she needs.
4	40	"Sweet Sorrow"	September 29, 1979
Fat Albert's ice skating friend, Roberta, offers to help the gang improve their skating skills when they play hockey. Unfortunately, she's troubled with the fact her parents are getting divorced. Initially, she takes her frustration out on the team, but her teacher helps her to learn it's not her fault they're getting divorced. Roberta also learns she can enjoy her time with each parent even though they're not together anymore.
5	41	"Poll Time"	October 6, 1979
Two candidates in the upcoming school election, Hugo and Baron, who are different races, play race politics until Fat Albert and Margene come up with an alternate solution by running together for student council.
6	42	"Mainstream"	October 13, 1979
Dennis is the gang's new classmate and they learn he has a mild intellectual disability. However, the teacher says he's capable of doing anything they can, only it takes him a little longer. After some minor screw-ups, Dennis is able to prove himself in an art show and winning the grand prize, earning the class new basketball uniforms.
7	43	"Free Ride"	October 20, 1979
Fat Albert and the gang learn their superstar skateboarding friend, Lawanda, regularly hitchhikes to get free rides. Despite their cautions, she decides to hitchhike on her way to a skating tournament. Unfortunately, she doesn't make it as she gets into an accident and ends up hospitalized. She learns her lesson as she recuperates and promises the gang to win the tournament next year.
8	44	"Soft Core"	October 27, 1979
Rudy's friend Dustin gives Fat Albert and friends the wrong sources on sex education with film and magazines. When Rudy's mother finds a magazine in his possession, she helps to set them straight on finding the right sources.

=== Season 6 (1980) ===
No. overall	No. in season	Title	Original release date
1	45	"Pain, Pain, Go Away"	September 6, 1980
The gang's friend, Darrell, has been feeling tired and sickly, but doesn't think he needs to see the school nurse or a doctor. A concerned Fat Albert speaks to Darrell's parents, who make him go to the hospital. It's discovered he has Hodgkin's disease, a form of cancer of the lymph nodes. Because it's in a localized area and it was detected early, it can be treated easily. Afterward, he and his parents express their gratitude to Fat Albert.
2	46	"The Rainbow"	September 13, 1980
Elisa has trouble accepting mixed-race children, especially Kim, the gang's other classmate who is the son of an interracial couple. She avoids interacting with him and runs off rather than play games with the group. She wanders into the old garment factory, which is condemned and winds up in danger. Kim and Fat Albert are able to enact a rescue and Elisa is able to learn a valuable lesson.
3	47	"The Secret"	September 20, 1980
Beau and Francie are brother and sister. However, Beau lets it slip that Francie was adopted by their parents. After she confronts them, the parents indeed admit they adopted her when she was a baby. Francie is distraught and runs away, only to wind up in danger as she falls into a river and will get pulled into a drain tunnel. Beau and Fat Albert are able to save her in time and the family reunite proving that they love their daughter no matter what.
4	48	"Easy Pickin's"	September 27, 1980
The gang is impressed with the number of material items Steve and Claudia have, giving them the impression they're rich. However, when Fat Albert investigates, he learns the twin siblings are routine shoplifters, stealing the various items from department stores and selling them to other kids. Fat Albert later notifies their parents, who indeed find some of the stolen items in their rooms. The twins think they'll never be caught. But when a stockroom boy named Johnny is arrested, accused of being the thief, they feel guilty and confess their crimes to the store manager. Note: Frank Welker voices Steve and John, and Linda Gary voices Steve and Claudia's mother.
5	49	"Good Ol' Dudes"	October 4, 1980
The gang's friend Richard has a tendency to "borrow" his uncle's car and gives them joyrides throughout town. He then takes a neighbor's car out while he's away, giving the gang another joyride. However, this leads to danger as their ride gets out of control and the car winds up in a lake. Fat Albert arrives in the nick of time to rescue them. As a result, Richard has to face the consequences with the police, his parents, and the neighbor who owns the car.
6	50	"Heads or Tails"	October 11, 1980
Weird Harold develops a gambling habit and tries to convince the gang to bet in a horse race. When they initially decline to contribute, Harold becomes an errand boy for Sheldon, a hustler, who promises to pay him. He's able to convince the others to join him, but Fat Albert refuses as he tries to talk sense into the gang. When the gang's sure bet loses, Weird Harold has to face the consequences for his actions just like Sheldon, who has already been thrown in jail for his scams.
7	51	"Pot of Gold"	October 18, 1980
The gang's classmate Patty was a straight-A student until she fell into the drug scene and now regularly gets high on marijuana. When the gang meets her drug pusher, Rudy is tempted to try it himself, but has a change of heart when he sees Patty in danger. He and Fat Albert are able to save her. They and a police officer meet with Patty's parents about her problem and she agrees to help get the pusher arrested, which is the first step on her road to recovery.
8	52	"The Gunslinger"	October 25, 1980
The gang's friend Shawn thinks he's cool by carrying around his father's gun. All are impressed except Fat Albert, who goes to his parents in an effort to stop him. Though the gun is usually unloaded, Rudy finds a bullet which enables Shawn to use it for target practice; this nearly tragedy when the gun backfires, severely injuring his hand. Fortunately, his father had medical training which helps to save his son. As a result, the gang learns a valuable lesson.

=== Season 7 (1982) ===
No. overall	No. in season	Title	Original release date
1	53	"Habla Espanol"	September 18, 1982
Rosita is a shy Mexican-American girl in the gang's class. Rudy ridicules her for her broken English, prompting her to miss class for a couple of days. When Fat Albert tries to intervene, they're interrupted when a fellow Hispanic has an emergency kitchen fire. With quick thinking and communication, they're able to put out the fire with little damage. Back at school, Miss Wucher assigns a project for the kids aimed at illustrating that they all have a heritage to be proud. Rosita is surprised the gang know of famous Mexican figures in history after returning to class and interacting with the gang again, eventually getting the last laugh on Rudy.
2	54	"2 by 2"	September 25, 1982
The gang's friends Arden and Baron are so in love with each other that they want to drop out of school and get married as soon as possible. At first, they don't care what others think, but then begin to have second thoughts when Arden realizes she won't be able to go to the high school prom or get her diploma. Fat Albert introduces Baron to Mudfoot, who introduces him to Ellen, a woman just a few years older than Baron. She and her husband Joey rushed into marriage around his age, but once on their own, had trouble finding steady jobs, paying their bills, weren't able to keep their new car, and couldn't even afford a phone once their daughter was born. These factors help Arden and Baron reconsider their decision and they choose to wait to see how things will turn out to better prepare them for life as adults.
3	55	"Parking Dog"	October 2, 1982
Fat Albert has doubts about the ability of his friends Cosgrove and Doreen to accept the responsibility of owning a new puppy. Cosgrove and Doreen leave their puppy Freddie home alone and he escapes through the window and ends up on the highway, becoming endangered by the heavy traffic. Fat Albert is able to call the police, who are able to save the puppy in time. Cosgrove and Doreen learn a hard lesson about responsibility. Note: Archive recordings of Larry Storch as Ping and Pong from The Brady Kids are used when Fat Albert calls the police.
4	56	"Water You Waiting For?"	October 9, 1982
The gang goes on a camping trip to Cedar Lake where they meet some new people. Along the way, Fat Albert takes a particular interest in a pretty girl named Janine and brags about his knowledge of water safety, only to find himself embarrassed when he learns she's the camp's main lifeguard who knows more than him. The two get along and she makes him her assistant lifeguard. Eventually, their teamwork comes in handy when Rudy's prank on Russell backfires, putting them both in jeopardy. After the narrow rescue, the gang and their new friends get a firsthand lesson in water safety.
5	57	"The New Father"	October 16, 1982
After her father's death, Buffy's mother eventually starts dating again and Mr. Haney is becoming more involved in their lives, much to Buffy's reluctance. She becomes further resistant when they announce they'll be getting married. Buffy runs away from home and hides out at the amusement park, even though it's closed. She winds up in danger as the gang tracks her down. Fortunately, Mr. Haney is able to save her in time and Buffy is willing to accept him as part of the family. Note: Greg Morris voices Mr. Haney.
6	58	"Double Cross"	October 23, 1982
The gang's friend Melinda tells the group she's taken interest in Double Cross. However, they don't care for Fat Albert and company because they're not of the same ethnic background. Mudfoot introduces Fat Albert to a rabbi who tells him of the tough life he had when the Nazis invaded his homeland. Later, Fat Albert confronts George, the Double Cross leader, about his racism. Late at night, George tries to vandalize a Jewish synagogue before he slips and gets himself in danger. Fat Albert and the police are able to mount a rescue, and George is arrested for his vandalism. Afterward, Melinda learns her lesson about who the true special people are in her life.
7	59	"Little Girl Found"	November 6, 1982
Greta is a teenage runaway who steals the gang's television and sells it to get what little money she can. Fat Albert tries to help Greta change her ways and Mudfoot tells her the story of Hansel and Gretel in hopes she'll return home to her family. Greta eventually runs afoul of a gang who plan on stealing some bicycles. Fat Albert comes to her aid at the train yard despite the odds. Luckily, Weird Harold gets the police at the scene to rescue them in the nick of time. After her close call, Greta makes a much-needed phone call to her mother, eventually taking the first steps to return home.: No Brown Hornet episode featured.
8	60	"Watch That First Step"	November 13, 1982
Fat Albert and the gang meet Marcus Detrick, a good athlete who's recently moved into the neighborhood. They invite him to play in an upcoming father/son baseball game, but he's reluctant to go, saying his father is out of town, but the true reason is revealed when his dad shows up to the game drunk. It's eventually revealed that Marcus' father is an alcoholic, and Marcus and his sister Michelle run away from home to avoid the problem. After initially getting into danger, they go to the gang's clubhouse where Fat Albert convinces them to go to an Alcoholics Anonymous meeting. There, they learn not to be angry or ashamed of their father and decide to return home to help their mother face the situation in hopes they can get him to recovery.

=== Season 8 (1984–85): The Adventures of Fat Albert and the Cosby Kids ===
No. overall	No. in season	Title	Original release date
1	61	"Have a Heart"	September 1, 1984
The gang stays after school to learn about CPR (cardiopulmonary resuscitation), but Rudy ditches the class early to focus more on basketball. When Mudfoot stops by, he joins him in practice and gives his usual advice on the importance of education. Shortly afterward, he has a heart attack and Rudy is unable to help. Luckily, the gang, leaving CPR class, is able to intervene with Fat Albert giving Mudfoot CPR while others call the paramedics. Mudfoot recovers and Rudy learns an important lesson, deciding to take the CPR class to be better prepared.
2	62	"Watch Thy Neighborhood"	September 8, 1984
The boys go to a Neighborhood Watch meeting after a burglary at Dumb Donald's house.
3	63	"Cosby's Classics"	September 15, 1984
When the clubhouse TV breaks, Bill regales the gang with the story of Paul Bunyan, which they enjoy so much that they decide to visit the library and learn more about him.
4	64	"Justice Good as Ever"	September 22, 1984
The gang takes interest in an upcoming bicycle race in which the winning team gets a trophy. Rudy is able to enter the event with his new bike, but it gets wrecked by Bobby Hansen, who backs into it with his car and refuses to take responsibility for his misdeed. Rudy is advised by a police officer to take the matter to a small claims court. With Fat Albert as his witness and the necessary evidence, Rudy has a strong case and Bobby makes things worse for himself by lying under oath. As a result, Bobby's family pays for a new bicycle just in time for the gang to enter the race.
5	65	"Rebop for Bebop"	September 29, 1984
Mudfoot offers to help when the boys enter a battle of the bands.
6	66	"Sinister Stranger"	October 6, 1984
Officer Gomez fingerprints the kids at school and offers them safety tips on dealing with strangers, but Hank (who stayed up late watching a movie the night before) is unable to focus and falls asleep during the presentation. Not long after, a stranger tries to grab Russell, who avoids being kidnapped by remembering what he learned, but when Hank is not so fortunate, it's up to the gang to help save him.
7	67	"Handwriting on the Wall"	October 13, 1984
A field trip is canceled because of the expense of covering over graffiti painted on a school wall. In order to recoup the money, the gang takes on a city project to paint a patriotic mural on a city building.
8	68	"Busted"	October 20, 1984
Larry is a car thief who impresses the gang by saying he knows how the police work. However, accepting a ride from Larry to the pool leads to trouble when Larry realizes John Law has other ideas. The gang is frightened of what they see in the jailhouse and a police sergeant sentences them to one-minute imprisonment, showing they could have a much longer time behind bars if they are not more careful with whom they associate with.
9	69	"It All Adds Up"	October 27, 1984
The kids contribute to the school's rummage sale. The gang is concerned some of the older stuff will not sell, but Rudy uses slick ways to sell their entire selection. One of the teachers shows Rudy the effects of his actions by giving him a faulty device that ruins his hat. The lesson is not over, as Rudy, Fat Albert, and the others must also head to the harbor when Rudy realizes he sold a faulty raft to a boy who cannot swim.
10	70	"Never Say Never"	November 3, 1984
The gang tries to cheer up Weird Harold's cousin Robin, who awaits a kidney transplant, by taking her to an amusement park. In an effort to help her find a kidney, they circulate flyers informing people of Robin's condition, through which a donor is successfully found. However, when Robin runs away before being notified of the fact, the gang has to find her before it's too late.
11	71	"Don't Call Us"	November 10, 1984
Red wants to quit school to focus on her singing career, but Fat Albert and the gang try to convince her that it is a mistake.
12	72	"The Runner"	November 17, 1984
A classmate named Ross is selling drugs at school, but Fat Albert and friends must decide whether to report it. They eventually end up doing so when another fellow classmate collapses, but they end up getting picked on by Ross and the other students for snitching. It's later revealed that Ross is an errand boy for two drug dealers, but he realizes his mistake the hard way when they end up drugging his sister.
13	73	"Video Mania"	November 24, 1984
Weird Harold spends all his money on video games, then makes amends by taking a job at the video arcade to earn money for picnic equipment for the gang.
14	74	"You Gotta Have Art"	December 1, 1984
Fat Albert makes friends with Leola the new girl in school, who is a shy budding artist. When Fat Albert invites her to decorate the clubhouse, Rudy expresses his disapproval, accidentally hurting Leola's feelings. However, when the gang finds pictures she drew of all of them, Rudy realizes the importance of art and, after saving Leola from nearly drowning, makes amends with her.
15	75	"Long Live the Queen"	December 8, 1984
On America Day, the gang gets to vote on who wins the title of America's Queen. They decide to nominate Keiko Imora, but the other students are against this, especially her opponent, Cindy Collins, considering Keiko is of Japanese descent. With the gang's help, Fat Albert helps the students learn not to judge a book by its cover.
16	76	"The Joker"	December 15, 1984
Dumb Donald's cousin Jason comes to town, but quickly wears out his welcome with the gang when his various pranks cause nothing but trouble. One prank results in the clubhouse TV being damaged, forcing the gang to work to earn money to buy a new one. Unfortunately, another prank from Jason ruins their efforts. Then Jason pulls a prank that results in Bucky getting injured and unable to compete in a skating competition. Feeling remorseful, Jason decides to take a job and surprises the gang with the new television. He apologizes and the gang invites him to watch the new set with them.
17	77	"Second Chance"	December 22, 1984
The gang meets Theodore, or "Fast Teddy", when he helps them out while they're building a time machine at the junkyard. After he, Bucky, and Rudy have a run-in with hustlers Melvin and Hoof, the gang eventually learn Teddy had spent some time in prison. A couple of days later, they find out the local gym where they work out was robbed. Suspicions lead to Fast Teddy, but the gang figures Melvin and Hoof were involved and decide to set up a sting where they can trap them. Sure enough, they are in possession of the stolen items and the gang, with the police, are able to apprehend them. Fast Teddy is released from custody and goes back with the gang to the gym for another workout.
18	78	"Kiss & Tell"	December 29, 1984
After a blunder-filled game of hockey, the gang seeks the help of Bob, the captain of the school's hockey, to help them work on their game. But he's not able to do so because he hasn't been feeling well lately, especially since he puts off seeing a doctor about his condition. In health class, the gang learns about sexually-transmitted (or venereal) diseases. Afterward, Fat Albert suspects Bob of having such a disease. Bob admits it, and also that he's embarrassed about it and continues to put off seeing a doctor. However, his performance suffers during a school game, and he's forced to go to the hospital. Bob's treated with some medicine and he confesses to his figure skater girlfriend Shanna to having VD, prompting her to see a doctor. She also had the disease, but got treated for it before her condition got worse. She's quickly back on the ice, showing off her moves to the gang. Note: This is the first episode where Legal Eagle is depicted as an in-series television show instead of one of Mudfoot's stories.
19	79	"Teenage Mom"	January 5, 1985
The gang's friend Liz Walker returns after a few months away to see that she's the single mother of her baby daughter Monica. Her ex-boyfriend Gary split after learning she became pregnant, leaving Liz to deal with her daughter alone. She begins to feel overwhelmed by her motherly duties to the point that she nearly hits her child. She takes a time out to talk to Fat Albert when he visits. But a fire breaks out at the apartment, trapping the two with the baby inside. The rest of the gang call the fire department, and they quickly respond to get everyone to safety. The duplex is ruined, forcing Liz and her mother to move in with her aunt. Fat Albert tells Liz that the local community guidance center can help her care for Monica. Liz can go back to school and learn to better care for her daughter with help from her mother and the center.
20	80	"Film Follies"	January 12, 1985
The kids make their own episode of the Brown Hornet for a film festival with Rudy as director. However, he ends up getting frustrated as the gang keeps making more and more mistakes. After getting advice from Mudfoot, he starts acting nicer to his friends, much to their suspicion. They eventually find out that Rudy wants to take the credit for himself, but when the gang wins the award, Rudy learns the value of teamwork.
21	81	"Harvest Moon"	January 19, 1985
The Cosby kids discover a dangerous chemical spill when they help out at their friend Roy's farm.
22	82	"Read Baby Read"	January 26, 1985
The boys try to convince the new kid, Mickey, that reading is more important than just playing sports.
23	83	"The Whiskey Kid"	February 2, 1985
Fat Albert notices that his friend Peter is acting strangely and finds out it's due to alcohol.
24	84	"Millionaire Madness"	February 9, 1985
The Cosby kids search for hidden loot after Rudy finds a treasure map.
25	85	"Call of the Wild"	February 16, 1985
Fat Albert and the Cosby kids take a trip to the country to visit Weird Harold's uncle. There, Russell befriends a baby fox and wants to keep it as a pet, so he sneaks it home and names it Freddy. Within a short time, Freddy's savage habits begin to kick in, and the gang has to convince Russell that wild animals aren't meant to be domesticated. However, living with Russell causes Freddy to forget how to live in the wild, so he's sent to live in a zoo instead.
26	86	"Funny Business"	February 23, 1985
When the gang goes to camp, Weird Harold practices jokes for the talent show. He helps Waldo and his sister Mindy learn the importance of having a sense of humor, when he and Mindy get trapped in a cave.
27	87	"3 Strikes, and You're In"	March 2, 1985
Fat Albert finds the perfect star pitcher when the boys get a challenge from the Junior League baseball champions, but she is a girl.
28	88	"What's the I.D.?"	March 9, 1985
Rudy and his new friend Hector try to use fake I.D.s at a nightclub, but it ends up backfiring when they are chased out by a couple of thugs for hitting on their girlfriends, and they won't stop pursuing them until they hide at Fat Albert's and call the police.
29	89	"Rules is Cool"	March 16, 1985
The police show up when Fat Albert's friend Tommy throws a party at his parents' house, after his friend Jerry plays the music so loud that it bothers the neighbors, puts alcohol in the punch, and smokes marijuana.
30	90	"The Birds, the Bees, and Dumb Donald"	March 23, 1985
Dumb Donald falls for Elaine, a cheerleader, but how will he compete with the star quarterback Hammerhead Rex?
31	91	"Double or Nothing"	March 30, 1985
Rudy learns an important lesson about winning big and losing big when he catches the gambling bug.
32	92	"Hot Wheels"	April 6, 1985
Fat Albert and the Cosby Kids visit the Museum of Natural History to see an exhibit on bicycles.
33	93	"No Place Like Home"	April 13, 1985
The Cosby Kids help Weird Harold's new girlfriend realize that real friends do not care whether you are rich or poor; they like you for you.
34	94	"Not So Loud"	April 20, 1985
The Cosby Kids enter the Sound City TV competition in hopes of winning airtime for their band.
35	95	"The Jinx"	April 27, 1985
Fat Albert and the Cosby Kids visit Rudy's uncle's ranch and leave the big city behind.
36	96	"You Don't Say"	May 4, 1985
Everybody wants to be on the school pep squad, but will Fat Albert and Weird Harold win a place?
37	97	"Amiss with Amish"	May 11, 1985
Fat Albert and the Cosby Kids visit an Amish community and learn about Amish society with their friend Sharon.
38	98	"Gang Wars"	May 18, 1985
Fat Albert tries to save his friend Fernando from getting involved with his older brother Tito's gang life, but it's too late and Fernando gets shot. Note: This is the only episode where a character dies on-screen and is one of the darker episodes.
39	99	"Computer Caper"	May 25, 1985
Russell exposes his classmate Greg as a computer hacker while working on a history assignment.
40	100	"We All Scream for Ice Cream"	June 1, 1985
Weird Harold is left in a sticky situation while working at his new job serving ice cream at Mr. Cooper's Ice Cream Shop.
41	101	"Superdudes"	June 8, 1985
Hoping to be like his hero, Dexter attempts a death-defying stunt.
42	102	"Painting for the Town"	June 15, 1985
Fat Albert and the boys try to help their friend Lenny find a job.
43	103	"Rudy and the Beast"	June 22, 1985
Rudy thinks it's his big break when the Cosby Kids meet a new girl whose father is a big time movie producer.
44	104	"Wheeler"	June 29, 1985
Fat Albert and the boys try to help their new friend Chuy, a.k.a. the Wheeler, feel welcome at school.
45	105	"Faking the Grade"	July 6, 1985
Dumb Donald's schoolwork needs to improve or he may not be able to advance to the next grade. This catches the attention of a teenager who previously had Dumb Donald's teacher, and offers to sell him the answers to future tests. Donald is feels conflicted about the meaning of academic success and facing the stigma of being held back.
46	106	"Write On"	July 13, 1985
Fat Albert gives his classmate Richard the encouragement he needs to write a blue ribbon poem for the school writing contest.
47	107	"Cable Caper"	July 20, 1985
When the Cosby Kids find out that Mr. and Mrs. Gibson may lose their home, they hit the airwaves to tell their neighbors' story.
48	108	"Say Uncle"	July 27, 1985
When Weird Harold's Uncle Marcus moves in with his family, space gets tight, especially in Weird Harold's room.
49	109	"No News is Good News"	August 3, 1985
The Cosby Kids learn about the responsibilities of the press when Rudy submits a false story to the school newspaper.
50	110	"Attitude of Gratitude"	August 10, 1985
When Fat Albert takes a job at the local zoo, he has trouble juggling his many responsibilities including school, homework, and work.

== Specials ==
No. in season	Title	Original release date
1	"Hey, Hey, Hey, it's Fat Albert"	12 November 1969
The first episode was created by Bill Cosby and animator Ken Mundie, and produced by Harry Gittes, and companated by Campbell-Silver-Cosby Corporation, before Filmation.
2	"Bill Cosby vs. Fat Albert: The Great Go-Cart Race (a.k.a. The Weird Harold Special)"	4 May 1973
Containing a copyright date of 1971, it was not broadcast until 1973, after the main show had already began airing on CBS on Saturday mornings the previous year. Two possibilities were that NBC, which had broadcast the prior animated Fat Albert special "Hey, Hey, Hey, It's Fat Albert", had rights to this plot and episode, or that it was a lost proto-pilot for the regular series.
3	"The Fat Albert Halloween Special"	24 October 1977
After a night filled with more tricking than treating, Rudy and his friend Devery plan one last prank for spooky Mrs. Bakewell. But when two of the kids disappear into the old widow's house, Fat Albert and the crew set out to find their missing friends.
4	"The Fat Albert Christmas Special"	18 December 1977
When a family in need shows up at their clubhouse on Christmas Eve, Fat Albert and the boys offer to lend a helping hand. But when Tightwad Tyrone, the grumpy junkyard owner, steps in, their good deeds could turn into a bad situation.
5	"The Fat Albert Easter Special"	3 April 1982
While Fat Albert and the Cosby Kids give old Mudfoot's home a surprise cleaning on Easter, Rudy decides to play a trick on his friends. Things get serious when Rudy's practical joke backfires and Mudfoot ends up in the hospital.

== Film ==
Title	Directed by	Written and storyboarded by	Release date
Main series
Fat Albert	Joel Zwick	Bill Cosby, Charles Kipps and Lowell Ganz	December 25, 2004 (U.S.); November 10th, 2004 (Philadelphia)
