= Norm Prescott =

American producer (1927–2005)

- Born: Norman Zachary Pransky; January 31, 1927; Boston, Massachusetts, U.S.
- Died: July 2, 2005 (aged 78); Encino, California, U.S.
- Occupation: Film producer
- Years active: 1947–1982

Norman Zachary Prescott (né Pransky; January 31, 1927 – July 2, 2005) was co-founder and executive producer at Filmation Associates, an animation studio he created with veteran animator Lou Scheimer.

== Life and career ==
Born to a Polish Jewish family in the Dorchester neighborhood of Boston, his birth name was Norman Zachary Pransky. His father Edward was a tailor and a shirt-maker. A graduate of Boston Latin School and Boston University, he began his career as a disc jockey. His first radio job, c. 1947, was at WHEB in Portsmouth NH. In 1948 he joined WHDH, and in October 1950, he became program director at station WORL. He briefly worked in New York at WNEW, before relocating to WBZ radio in late 1955; in 1956, he became one of the "Live Five" after WBZ dropped its syndicated NBC programming and went on the air with live disc jockeys. In the summer of 1959, he left radio and went to work for Joseph E. Levine's Embassy Pictures Corporation, serving as vice president of music, merchandising and post-production. He, Scheimer, and Hal Sutherland formed Filmation in 1963.

== Productions ==
- 1965 Pinocchio in Outer Space (Belgian co-produced feature film)
- 1966 The New Adventures of Superman
- 1967 Journey to the Center of the Earth
- 1968 Fantastic Voyage
- 1968 The Batman/Superman Hour
- 1968 The Archie Show
- 1969 The Hardy Boys
- 1970 Will the Real Jerry Lewis Please Sit Down
- 1970 Groovie Goolies
- 1970 Fat Albert and the Cosby Kids
- 1972 The Brady Kids
- 1973 Star Trek: The Animated Series
- 1973 Lassie's Rescue Rangers
- 1973 My Favorite Martians
- 1974 The U.S. of Archie
- 1974 The New Adventures of Gilligan
- 1975 The Original Ghostbusters
- 1976 Tarzan, Lord of the Jungle
- 1976 Ark II
- 1978 Tarzan and the Super 7
- 1978 Fabulous Funnies

== Other professional work ==
Prescott also produced and directed the 1973 animated film Treasure Island and produced and wrote 1974's Journey Back to Oz, which features Liza Minnelli as the voice of Dorothy (Ms. Minnelli is the daughter of Judy Garland, who portrayed that same character in MGM's 1939 live-action film).

Filmation produced the popular Star Trek animated series in 1973. Prescott also was producer for The Secret Lives of Waldo Kitty, Tarzan, Lord of the Jungle, Space Sentinels, The New Adventures of Flash Gordon, The New Adventures of Mighty Mouse and Heckle & Jeckle (he also voiced Theodore H. Bear in the show's Quacula episodes), Sport Billy, The Tom and Jerry Comedy Show, and Blackstar.

== Death ==
Prescott died of natural causes in Los Angeles on July 2, 2005, at the age of 78. Professionally, he was survived by Scheimer and his colleagues at Filmation. He was also survived by his wife, Elaine, to whom he had been married for fifty-three years, and sons Jeffrey and Michael.
