= List of works produced by Filmation =

This is a list of animated television series, made-for-television films, direct-to-video films, theatrical short subjects, and feature films produced by Filmation. Note that some shows or new spin-offs of shows may be listed twice.

== Television series ==
=== 1960s ===
Title	Years	Network	Notes	Co-production	Episodes
Rod Rocket	1963	Syndication	Filmation was at this point just Scheimer and Sutherland, and took over series by contract	SIB Productions	65
The New Adventures of Superman	1966–1970	CBS	DC Comics: Based on Superman	National Periodical Publications	68
The Adventures of Superboy	1966–1969	CBS	DC Comics: Based on Superman	National Periodical Publications	34
Journey to the Center of the Earth	1967–1969	ABC	Based on the 1959 feature film of the same name	20th Century Fox Television	17
The Superman/Aquaman Hour of Adventure: Aquaman; The Adventures of Superboy; The New Adventures of Superman; Teen Titans; The Flash; The Atom; Green Lantern; Hawkman; Justice League of America	1967–1968	CBS	DC Comics: Based on Aquaman and Superman	Ducovny Productions; National Periodical Publications	3 episodes per guest star segment
Fantastic Voyage	1968–1969	ABC	Based on the 1966 feature film of the same name	20th Century Fox Television	17
Aquaman	1968–1970	CBS	DC Comics: Based on Aquaman	National Periodical Publications	36
The Archie Show	1968–1969	CBS	Based on Archie comic book series	The Archie Company	17
The Batman/Superman Hour: The Adventures of Batman; The New Adventures of Superman; The Adventures of Superboy	1968–1969	CBS	DC Comics: The first animated adaptation of Batman; Based on Superman	Ducovny Productions; National Periodical Publications	
The Adventures of Batman	1968–1969	CBS	DC Comics: The first animated adaptation of Batman	Ducovny Productions; National Periodical Publications	17
The Archie Comedy Hour: Sabrina the Teenage Witch	1969–1970	CBS	Based on Archie comic book series	The Archie Company	
The Hardy Boys	1969–1971	ABC	Animated adaptation of The Hardy Boys		17

=== 1970s ===
Title	Years	Network	Notes	Co-production	Episodes
Archie's Funhouse	1970–1971	CBS	Based on Archie comic book series		23
Will the Real Jerry Lewis Please Sit Down	1970–1972	ABC	Based on characters from the Jerry Lewis film The Family Jewels		18
Sabrina and the Groovie Goolies: Sabrina the Teenage Witch; Groovie Goolies	1970–1974	CBS	Based on Archie comic book series	The Sabrina Company	16
Archie's TV Funnies	1971–1973	CBS	Based on Archie comic book series		16
Fat Albert and the Cosby Kids	1972–1976	CBS			36
The Brady Kids	1972–1973	ABC	Animated adaptation of The Brady Bunch	Paramount Television	22
Lassie's Rescue Rangers	1972–1973	ABC	Animated adaptation of Lassie	Lassie Television	15
Everything's Archie	1973–1974	CBS	Based on Archie comic book series		
Star Trek: The Animated Series	1973–1974	NBC	Animated adaptation of Star Trek: The Original Series	Norway Productions; Paramount Television	22
My Favorite Martians	1973	CBS	Animated adaptation of My Favorite Martian	Jack Chertok Productions	16
Mission: Magic!	1973	ABC	Spin-off of The Brady Kids	Paramount Television	16
The U.S. of Archie	1974	CBS	Based on Archie comic book series		16
The New Adventures of Gilligan	1974–1975	ABC	First animated adaptation of Gilligan's Island		24
Shazam!	1974–1976	CBS	DC Comics; Live-action	DC Comics	28
The Secret Lives of Waldo Kitty	1975–1976	NBC	Live-action/animated		13
The Secrets of Isis	1975–1977	CBS	DC Comics Live-action		22
The Ghost Busters	1975–1976	CBS	Live-action		15
Uncle Croc's Block: Fraidy Cat; Wacky and Packy; M*U*S*H	1975–1976	ABC	Live-action/animated		16
Tarzan, Lord of the Jungle	1976–1979	CBS	Based on Edgar Rice Burroughs's Tarzan, distributed by Warner Bros. Television Studios and administered by Edgar Rice Burroughs company		36
Ark II	1976–1977	CBS	Live-action		16
The New Adventures of Batman	1977–1978	CBS	DC Comics: Based on Batman	DC Comics	16
Space Academy	1977–1979	CBS	Live-action		15
Space Sentinels	1977–1978	NBC	Loosely based on Greek mythology		13
The Batman/Tarzan Adventure Hour: Tarzan, Lord of the Jungle; The New Adventures of Batman	1977–1978	CBS	Based on Edgar Rice Burroughs's Tarzan, DC Comics: Based on Batman		
The New Archie and Sabrina Hour: The Bang-Shang Lalapalooza Show (Archie); Super Witch (Sabrina)	1977–1978	NBC	Based on Archie comic book series	The Archie Company; The Sabrina Company	13
The Groovie Goolies and Friends	1977–1978	Syndication	Based on Archie comic book series 1978; The final animated series featuring Archie Comic properties produced by Filmation		
Tarzan and the Super 7: Tarzan, Lord of the Jungle; The New Adventures of Batman; The Freedom Force; Manta and Moray; Superstretch and Microwoman; Web Woman; Jason of Star Command (live-action)	1978–1980	CBS	Programing block which originally ran 90 min, later shortened down to 60 min, by dropping Tarzan and Jason of Star Command		33
Fabulous Funnies: Alley Oop; Nancy; Broom-Hilda; Emmy Lou; The Captain and the Kids; Tumbleweeds	1978–1979	NBC	Show based on various newspaper comic strips		13
The New Adventures of Mighty Mouse and Heckle & Jeckle: Mighty Mouse; Heckle and Jeckle; Quacula	1979–1980	CBS	Two of its segments were based on original Terrytoons properties Mighty Mouse and Heckle & Jeckle	Viacom Productions	48
The New Adventures of Flash Gordon	1979–1982	NBC	Based on comic strip Flash Gordon	King Features Syndicate	32
The New Fat Albert Show: The Brown Hornet	1979–1981	CBS			24

=== 1980s ===
Title	Years	Network	Notes	Co-production	Episodes
Batman and the Super 7: The New Adventures of Batman; Web Woman; Manta and Moray; The Freedom Force; Superstretch and Microwoman	1980–1981	NBC		DC Comics	
The Tarzan/Lone Ranger Adventure Hour: Tarzan, Lord of the Jungle; The Lone Ranger	1980–1981	CBS	Animated adaptation of Lone Ranger		28
The Tom and Jerry Comedy Show: Tom and Jerry; Droopy	1980–1982	CBS		MGM Television	15
Sport Billy	1980–1981	NBC	Show based on European comic of same name Originally produced for Germany		26
Blackstar	1981–1982	CBS			13
The Kid Super Power Hour with Shazam!: Shazam!; Hero High	1981–1982	NBC		DC Comics	26
The Tarzan/Lone Ranger/Zorro Adventure Hour: Tarzan, Lord of the Jungle; The Lone Ranger; The New Adventures of Zorro	1981–1982	CBS	Animated adaptation of Zorro	TMS Entertainment	13
Gilligan's Planet	1982–1983	CBS	Second animated adaptation of Gilligan's Island and sequel series to The New Adventures of Gilligan		13
He-Man and the Masters of the Universe	1983–1985	Syndication		Mattel	130
The Adventures of Fat Albert and the Cosby Kids	1984–1985	Syndication			50
She-Ra: Princess of Power	1985–1987	Syndication		Mattel	93
Ghostbusters	1986–1988	Syndication	Based on Filmation's 1975 live-action TV series The Ghost Busters	Tribune Entertainment	65
BraveStarr	1987–1988	Syndication	The last animated series produced by Filmation	Group W Productions	65

== Television films, shorts and specials ==
Title	Airdate	Network	Notes	Co-production
His Mother Marveled	1963	Syndication		Family Films
A Day at the Horse Opera	1966	N/A	unaired pilot featuring Marx Brothers	
Dick Digit and the Jester	1967	N/A	unaired pilot/promotional film	
Archie and his New Pals	September 13, 1969	CBS		
The Archie, Sugar Sugar, Jingle Jangle Show	March 20, 1970	CBS		
Aesop's Fables	October 31, 1971	CBS	Based on the fable of The Tortoise and the Birds and the fable of The Tortoise and the Hare.	Lorimar Productions
The Brady Kids on Mysterious Island	September 9, 1972	ABC	Introduction to The Brady Kids; aired as part of The ABC Saturday Superstar Movie	Paramount Television
Lassie and the Spirit of Thunder Mountain	November 11, 1972	ABC	Introduction to Lassie's Rescue Rangers; aired as part of The ABC Saturday Superstar Movie	Lassie Television
Daffy Duck and Porky Pig Meet the Groovie Goolies	December 16, 1972	ABC	Aired as part of The ABC Saturday Superstar Movie	Warner Bros. Television
Weird Harold Special: The Great Go-Cart Race	May 4, 1973	NBC	Introduces Fat Albert and the Cosby Kids character. Produced earlier, as second of two specials Bill Cosby promised to network; the first not produced by Filmation	
The Fat Albert Halloween Special	October 24, 1977	CBS		
The Fat Albert Christmas Special	December 18, 1977	CBS		
Treasure Island	April 29, 1980	NBC	Produced in 1973; edited version aired as part of NBC Special Treat series	Warner Bros.
A Snow White Christmas	December 19, 1980	CBS		
Oliver Twist	April 14, 1981	NBC	Produced in 1974; edited version aired as part of NBC Special Treat series	Warner Bros.
The Fat Albert Easter Special	April 3, 1982	CBS		
Flash Gordon: The Greatest Adventure of All	August 21, 1982	NBC		King Features Syndicate
He-Man & She-Ra: A Christmas Special	December 25, 1985	Syndication		Mattel

== Theatrical films ==
Title	Release date	Distribution	Notes	Co-production
Journey Back to Oz	December 14, 1972	Seymour Borde (USA); Warner Bros. (International)	Produced in 1962; unreleased until 1972 in UK, 1974 in US	
Treasure Island	December 9, 1973	Warner Bros.	Edited version aired in 1980 as part of NBC Special Treat series	
Oliver Twist	July 10, 1974	Warner Bros.	Edited version aired in 1981 as part of NBC Special Treat series	
Mighty Mouse in the Great Space Chase	December 10, 1982	Filmation		Viacom Productions
The Secret of the Sword	March 22, 1985	Atlantic Releasing Corporation	also known as: He-Man and She-Ra: The Secret of the Sword	Mattel
Pinocchio and the Emperor of the Night	December 25, 1987	New World Pictures		
BraveStarr: The Movie	March 18, 1988	Taurus Entertainment	Alternate title: BraveStarr: The Legend	
Happily Ever After	June 30, 1989	First National Productions	Produced in 1988; released in 1989 in the Philippines, 1990 in France, unreleased until 1993 in US	Kel-Air Entertainment
