= 1980–81 United States network television schedule (daytime) =

The following is the 1980–81 daytime network television schedule for the three major English-language commercial broadcast networks in the United States. It covers the weekday and weekend daytime hours from September 1980 to August 1981.

== Legend ==
- Light yellow indicates talk shows.
- Green indicates soap operas.
- Pink indicates game shows.
- Gold indicates news and public affairs programming.
- Light teal indicates sporting events.
- White indicates local programming.
- Light purple indicates children's programming.
- Gray indicates encore programming (e.g., reruns of prime-time programming).
- New series are highlighted in **bold**.

== Schedule ==
- All times correspond to U.S. Eastern and Pacific Time scheduling (except for some live sports or events). Except where affiliates slot certain programs outside their network-dictated timeslots, subtract one hour for Central, Mountain, Alaska, and Hawaii-Aleutian times.
- Local schedules may differ, as affiliates have the option to pre-empt or delay network programs. Such scheduling may be limited to preemptions caused by local or national breaking news or weather coverage (which may force stations to tape delay certain programs to other timeslots) and any major sports events scheduled to air in a weekday timeslot (mainly during major holidays). Stations may air shows at other times at their preference.

=== Monday–Friday ===
Network		6:00 am	6:30 am	7:00 am	7:30 am	8:00 am	8:30 am	9:00 am	9:30 am	10:00 am	10:30 am	11:00 am	11:30 am	noon	12:30 pm	1:00 pm	1:30 pm	2:00 pm	2:30 pm	3:00 pm	3:30 pm	4:00 pm	4:30 pm	5:00 pm	5:30 pm	6:00 pm	6:30 pm
ABC	Fall	Local/syndicated programming		Good Morning America				Local/syndicated programming				The Love Boat		Family Feud	Ryan's Hope FYI (12:58)	All My Children		One Life to Live FYI (2:58)		General Hospital FYI (3:58)		The Edge of Night	Local/syndicated programming				ABC World News Tonight
ABC	Summer	Local/syndicated programming		Good Morning America				Local/syndicated programming				**Three's Company**	**Three's Company**	Family Feud	Ryan's Hope FYI (12:58)	All My Children		One Life to Live FYI (2:58)		General Hospital FYI (3:58)		The Edge of Night	Local/syndicated programming				ABC World News Tonight
CBS	Fall	Sunrise Semester		Morning		Captain Kangaroo		Local/syndicated programming		The Jeffersons	Alice	The Price Is Right CBS News Newsbreak (11:57)		Local/syndicated programming	Search for Tomorrow	The Young and the Restless		As the World Turns		Guiding Light CBS News Newsbreak (3:57)		One Day at a Time	Local/syndicated programming				CBS Evening News
CBS	Summer	Sunrise Semester		Morning		Captain Kangaroo		Local/syndicated programming		The Jeffersons	Alice	The Price Is Right CBS News Newsbreak (11:57)		Local/syndicated programming	The Young and the Restless		As the World Turns		Search for Tomorrow	Guiding Light CBS News Newsbreak (3:57)		One Day at a Time	Local/syndicated programming				CBS Evening News
NBC		Local/syndicated programming		Today				Local/syndicated programming		**Las Vegas Gambit**	**Blockbusters**	Wheel of Fortune	Password Plus	Card Sharks	The Doctors	Days of Our Lives		Another World		Texas		Local/syndicated programming					NBC Nightly News

=== Notes ===
- ABC had a 6PM (ET)/5PM (CT) feed for World News Tonight, depending on stations' schedule.

=== Saturday ===
Network		7:00 am	7:30 am	8:00 am	8:30 am	9:00 am	9:30 am	10:00 am	10:30 am	11:00 am	11:30 am	noon	12:30 pm	1:00 pm	1:30 pm	2:00 pm	2:30 pm	3:00 pm	3:30 pm	4:00 pm	4:30 pm	5:00 pm	5:30 pm	6:00 pm	6:30 pm
ABC	Fall	Local and/or syndicated programming		**Super Friends Hour** / Schoolhouse Rock! (8:56AM)		**The Fonz and the Happy Days Gang**	Scooby-Doo and Scrappy-Doo / Schoolhouse Rock! (10:26AM)		**Heathcliff and Dingbat**	The Plasticman/Baby Plas Super Comedy	**Thundarr the Barbarian**	ABC Weekend Special	American Bandstand		ABC Sports and/or local programming									Local news	ABC World News Saturday
ABC	November	Local and/or syndicated programming		**Super Friends Hour** / Schoolhouse Rock! (8:56AM)		**The Fonz and the Happy Days Gang**	**The Richie Rich/Scooby-Doo Show** / Schoolhouse Rock! (10:26AM)		Thundarr the Barbarian	Heathcliff and Dingbat	The Plasticman/Baby Plas Super Comedy	ABC Weekend Special	American Bandstand		ABC Sports and/or local programming									Local news	ABC World News Saturday
CBS	Fall	Local and/or syndicated programming		The New Adventures of Mighty Mouse and Heckle & Jeckle	**The Tom and Jerry Comedy Show**	The Bugs Bunny/Road Runner Show			The All New Popeye Hour		**Drak Pack**	The New Fat Albert Show	**The Tarzan/Lone Ranger Adventure Hour**		30 Minutes	CBS Sports and/or local programming								Local news	CBS Evening News
CBS	March	Local and/or syndicated programming		The Tom and Jerry Comedy Show	The Bugs Bunny/Road Runner Show			The All New Popeye Hour		The Tarzan/Lone Ranger Adventure Hour		The New Fat Albert Show	Drak Pack	Jason of Star Command (R)	30 Minutes	CBS Sports and/or local programming								Local news	CBS Evening News
NBC	Fall	Local and/or syndicated programming		The Godzilla/Dynomutt Hour		Fred and Barney Meet the Shmoo			The Daffy Duck Show	Batman and the Super 7		Jonny Quest (R)	The Jetsons (R) (Sept. 27/Oct. 4); **Drawing Power** (starting Oct. 11)	NBC Sports and/or local programming										Local news	NBC Nightly News
NBC	November	Local and/or syndicated programming		The Godzilla/Hong Kong Phooey Hour		**The Flintstone Comedy Show**			The Daffy Duck Show	Batman and the Super 7		Jonny Quest (R)	The Jetsons (R) (Sept. 27/Oct. 4); **Drawing Power** (starting Oct. 11)	NBC Sports and/or local programming										Local news	NBC Nightly News
NBC	May	Local and/or syndicated programming		The Flintstone Comedy Show		Godzilla (R)	Batman and the Super 7		The Daffy Duck Show	The Jetsons (R)	Hong Kong Phooey (R)	Jonny Quest (R)	The Flintstones (R)	NBC Sports and/or local programming										Local news	NBC Nightly News

In the News aired ten times during CBS's Saturday morning shows.

Ask NBC News aired after the credits of NBC's Saturday morning shows except Batman and the Super 7, Jonny Quest, and Drawing Power. Time Out aired after Jonny Quest.

=== Sunday ===
Network		7:00 am	7:30 am	8:00 am	8:30 am	9:00 am	9:30 am	10:00 am	10:30 am	11:00 am	11:30 am	noon	12:30 pm	1:00 pm	1:30 pm	2:00 pm	2:30 pm	3:00 pm	3:30 pm	4:00 pm	4:30 pm	5:00 pm	5:30 pm	6:00 pm	6:30 pm
ABC		Local and/or syndicated programming							Kids Are People Too		Animals, Animals, Animals	Issues and Answers	ABC Sports and/or local programming											Local news	ABC World News Sunday
CBS	Fall	Local and/or syndicated programming		The Skatebirds (R)	The Robonic Stooges (R)	CBS News Sunday Morning			Local and/or syndicated programming		Face the Nation	Local and/or syndicated programming	The NFL Today	NFL on CBS and/or local programming											
CBS	Mid-winter	The Robonic Stooges (R)	Jason of Star Command (R)	Local and/or syndicated programming		CBS News Sunday Morning			Local and/or syndicated programming		Face the Nation	CBS Sports and/or local programming												Local news	CBS Evening News
NBC	Fall	Local and/or syndicated programming										Meet the Press	NFL '80	NFL on NBC and local programming											
NBC	Mid-winter	Local and/or syndicated programming										Meet the Press	NBC Sports and/or local programming											Local news	NBC Nightly News

== By network ==
=== ABC ===
**Returning series**

- ABC Weekend Special
- ABC World News Tonight
- All My Children
- American Bandstand
- Animals, Animals, Animals
- The Edge of Night
- Family Feud
- General Hospital
- Good Morning America
- Issues and Answers
- Kids Are People Too
- The Love Boat (reruns)
- One Life to Live
- The Plasticman/Baby Plas Super Comedy
- Schoolhouse Rock!

**New series**

- **The Fonz and the Happy Days Gang**
- **Heathcliff and Dingbat**
- **The Richie Rich/Scooby-Doo Show**
- **Super Friends**
- **Three's Company** (reruns)
- **Thundarr the Barbarian**

**Canceled/Ended**

- The $20,000 Pyramid continued in syndication in 1981, then returned in 1982 on CBS
- Captain Caveman and the Teen Angels
- Laff-A-Lympics
- Laverne & Shirley
- Scooby-Doo and Scrappy-Doo
- Spider-Woman
- The World's Greatest Super Friends

=== CBS ===
**Returning series**

- 30 Minutes
- Alice (reruns)
- The All New Popeye Hour
- As the World Turns
- The Bugs Bunny/Road Runner Show (reruns)
- Captain Kangaroo
- CBS Evening News
- CBS News Sunday Morning
- Face the Nation
- Guiding Light
- Jason of Star Command (reruns)
- The Jeffersons (reruns)
- Morning
- The New Adventures of Mighty Mouse and Heckle & Jeckle
- The New Fat Albert Show
- One Day at a Time (reruns)
- The Price Is Right
- The Robonic Stooges (reruns)
- Search for Tomorrow
- The Skatebirds (reruns)
- Sunrise Semester
- The Young and the Restless

**New series**

- **Drak Pack**
- **The Tarzan/Lone Ranger Adventure Hour**
- **The Tom and Jerry Comedy Show**

**Canceled/Ended**

- Beat the Clock
- Love of Life
- Shazam!
- Tarzan and the Super 7
- Whew! / Celebrity Whew!

=== NBC ===
**Returning series**

- Another World
- Card Sharks
- The Daffy Duck Show (reruns)
- Days of Our Lives
- The Doctors
- Fred and Barney Meet the Shmoo
- Gambit (renamed Las Vegas Gambit)
- Godzilla (reruns)
- The Godzilla / Dynomutt Hour (reruns)
- Hong Kong Phooey (reruns)
- The Jetsons (reruns)
- Jonny Quest (reruns)
- Meet the Press
- NBC Nightly News
- Password Plus
- Texas
- Today
- Wheel of Fortune

**New series**

- **Batman and the Super 7**
- **Blockbusters**
- **Drawing Power**
- **The Flintstone Comedy Show**

**Canceled/Ended**

- Casper and the Angels
- Chain Reaction
- The David Letterman Show
- Fred and Barney Meet the Thing
- The Godzilla/Globetrotters Adventure Hour
- High Rollers
- The Hollywood Squares
- Hot Hero Sandwich
- Mindreaders
- The New Adventures of Flash Gordon
- The New Shmoo
- The Super Globetrotters

== See also ==
- 1980-81 United States network television schedule (prime-time)
- 1980-81 United States network television schedule (late night)

== Sources ==
- https://web.archive.org/web/20071015122215/http://curtalliaume.com/abc_day.html
- https://web.archive.org/web/20071015122235/http://curtalliaume.com/cbs_day.html
- https://web.archive.org/web/20071012211242/http://curtalliaume.com/nbc_day.html
