= Darrell McNeil =

American animator

Darrell Tyrone "Big D" McNeil (November 26, 1957 - July 4, 2018) was an American animator, writer, editor, publisher, producer, and actor. He started at the age of eight performing as a background actor and bit player in various movies and television series. He entered the animation industry at the age of 18 with Hanna-Barbera Productions. He was most recently developing and producing a number of animated and live action projects through his own company, Gold Medal Productions.

== Early life and education ==
McNeil was born in Inglewood, California in the Los Angeles area, (specifically Inglewood) of California in 1957. Always interested in television, McNeil became a member of the Screen Children's Guild. For the next several years, McNeil worked on a variety of different shows and movies, including 13 episodes of "The Brady Bunch", "Family Affair", "Cowboy In Africa", "The Partridge Family", and "Archie's Funhouse" {as one of the live action kids in the audience} for his future animation studio employer Filmation Associates. Even more than acting, he wanted to do animation.

In 1966, when the first of animated series produced specifically for the nascent "Saturday Morning Television" time period began airing, he was especially impressed by Hanna-Barbera's "Space Ghost and Dino Boy". He decided he would not only strive to become an animator, but that he would work for Hanna-Barbera, meet and befriend the main people involved with Space Ghost, and work on Space Ghost himself and get his name in the credits for it....all of which he eventually managed to do.

After graduating from Westchester High School in 1975, McNeil attended Cal State University Long Beach where he took an animation history class taught by veteran Hanna-Barbera producer Art Scott. At a UCLA "Saturday Morning" class he met William Hanna and Joseph Barber themselves, and was encouraged by Barbera to pitch some of his own show concepts as possible H+B shows. He thus became the first black H-B writer/artist as well as the youngest creator (age 18) to sell animated show concepts. Three of the seven series he pitched were optioned. Hanna encouraged McNeil to enter H-B's then new training program, which the studio had created to train the next generation of animation artists.

== Animation career ==
While still 18, McNeil was hired by H-B to become an inbetweener for the studio. He met and became close friends with Space Ghost developer/creator Alex Toth and Space Ghost voice Gary Owens. He eventually served as lead layout artist on a revival of "Space Ghost" in 1980.

Starting with Hanna-Barbera in 1976, McNeil worked for numerous animation studios over the next four decades, including Filmation Associates, Ruby-Spears, DIC, Bakshi, Encore, Saban Entertainment, Marvel, Murakami-Wolf-Swenson, Disney, Invision, Calico, Vignette, Don Bluth, Universal, Warner Bros, Stan Lee/The Firm, and even a stint at Paramount animating special effects for the first "Star Trek" feature film.

Due to a decision made early in his career to leave working for union animation studios and to work mainly for local non-union studio subcontractors Hutten/Love, McNeil got no screen credit for much of the work and many of the series he worked for.

== Writing career ==
McNeil also became a noted animation historian, particularly with the studios that produced television animation in the 60s thru the 70's. He started writing about his work on and about various Saturday morning cartoons shortly after he first began animating. Starting with a yearly correspondence with the writer/editor of DC Comics "Super Friends" comic book, E. Nelson Bridwell, he started writing about and covering comic book based animation and live-action productions for a number of publications and periodicals, including The Comics Reader, Comics Buyers Guide (CBG), Comics Scene, and TOON Magazine (which he cofounded) among many others.

He later co-wrote two animation books, "Hanna-Barbera's World of Super Adventure" and "Animation by Filmation". He later joined with his long time mentor and closest friend, legendary comic book/animation artist Alex Toth, to co-write "Alex Toth: By Design".

== Producing career ==
Under auspices of his Gold Medal Productions, McNeil has created over a hundred new concepts over the decades, several of them co-developed with Alex Toth. He optioned nearly a dozen concepts to various companies including Hanna-Barbera, Encore Enterprises, Riverstar Entertainment, and JDL Productions. Some of these are currently in the process of being launched on the web via his streaming subscription based website, "Big D's PC-TV".

== Filmography ==
=== Animation ===
- The All-New Super Friends Hour (1977) [uncredited]
- The Scooby-Doo Show (1977) {uncredited]
- Dynomutt, Dog Wonder (1977) [uncredited]
- Laff-A-lympics (1977) [uncredited]
- Captain Caveman and the Teen Angels (1977) [uncredited]
- A Flintstone Christmas (1977) [uncredited]
- The Funny World of Fred and Bunni (1977) [uncredited]
- Rock Odyssey (1978) [uncredited]
- Challenge of the Superfriends (1978) [uncredited]
- Yogi's Space Race (1978) [uncredited]
- Yogi's Galaxy Goofups (1978) [uncredited]
- Godzilla (1978) [uncredited]
- Jana of the Jungle (1978) [uncredited]
- The New Adventures of Batman (1978) [uncredited]
- Tarzan, Lord of the Jungle (1978)
- Superstretch and Microwoman (1978)
- Manta and Moray (1978)
- Web Woman (1978)
- Freedom Force (1978)
- The Fabulous Funnies (1978)
- Flash Gordon: Greatest Adventure of All (1978) [uncredited]
- Flash Gordon (1978) [uncredited]
- The New Adventures of Mighty Mouse (1979) [uncredited]
- Quacula (1979) [uncredited]
- Plastic Man (1979)
- Mighty Man and Yukk (1979)
- Rickety Rocket (1979)
- Fangface (1979)
- The Thing (1979) [uncredited]
- Casper and the Angels (1979) [uncredited]
- Scooby and Scrappy Doo (1979) [uncredited]
- The New Shmoo (1979) [uncredited]
- The Super Globetrotters (1979) [uncredited]
- The Fonz and the Happy Days Gang (1980) [uncredited]
- Richie Rich (1980) [uncredited]
- Popeye (1980) [uncredited]
- Space Ghost (1980)
- The Herculoids (1980)
- Space Stars Finale (1980)
- Space Stars Wraparounds (1980)
- The Lone Ranger (1980) [uncredited]
- Fat Albert and The Cosby Kids (1980) [uncredited]
- The Brown Hornet (1980) [uncredited]
- Lavern and Shirley in the Army (1981) [uncredited]
- Blackstar (1981) [uncredited]
- Shazam! (1981) [uncredited]
- Hero High (1981) [uncredited]
- Bedrock Cops (1981) [uncredited]
- The Frankenstones (1981) [uncredited]
- Astro and the Space Mutts (1980)
- The Pebbles and Bamm-Bamm (1981) [uncredited]
- Smurfs (1981) [uncredited]
- Dino and Cavemouse (1981) [uncredited]
- Mork and Mindy (1982) [uncredited]
- Snorks (1982) [uncredited]
- The Dukes (1983) [uncredited]
- The Little Rascals (1982)
- Pac-Man (1982)
- Gilligan's Planet (1982) [uncredited]
- Monchhichis (1982) [uncredited]
- The Gary Coleman Show (1982) [uncredited]
- Trollkins (1982) [uncredited]
- The Shirt Tales (1983) [uncredited]
- The Super Friends Hour (1983) [uncredited]
- GI Joe (1983) [uncredited]
- Mr. T (1983) [uncredited]
- Kidd Video (1984) [uncredited]
- Kwicky Koala (1980) [uncredited]
- Hulk Hogan Rock and Wrestling (1984) [uncredited]
- Transformers (1984) [uncredited]
- Donkey Kong (1984) [uncredited]
- Space Ace (1984) [uncredited]
- Heathcliff (1984)
- Catallac Cats (1984)
- Jem: Starlight The MoviE (1985) [uncredited]
- Bigfoot and the Muscle Machines (1985) [uncredited]
- Yogi's Treasure Hunt (1985)
- The Biskitts (1983) [uncredited]
- The 13 Ghosts of Scooby-Doo (1985) [uncredited]
- Jem (1986)
- My Little Pony (1986) [uncredited]
- Transformers: The Movie (1986) [uncredited]
- He-Man (1983) [uncredited]
- She-Ra (1985) [uncredited]
- The Real Ghostbusters (1987)
- Teenage Mutant Ninja Turtles (1988)
- Jetsons: The Movie (1988)
- Mighty Mouse (1988)
- Chip 'n Dale: Rescue Rangers (1989) [uncredited]
- Battle of Turkey Hill (1989)
- Dino-Riders (1989)
- Slimer! (1988) [uncredited]
- Chipmunks: Rockin' Through the Ages (1990)
- James Bond Jr. (1991)
- If You Love Me.... (1991)
- Seebert (1991) [uncredited]
- Sir Chomps (1992) [uncredited]
- Rock-a-Doodle (1992)
- Rocky and Bullwinkle spot (1984) [uncredited]
- The Turkey Caper (1984)
- Rambo Spot (1986) [uncredited]
- Ninja Turtles Spot (1986) [uncredited]
- Visionaires (1987) [uncredited]
- Disney/Mattel spot (1980) [uncredited]
- Superman (1988)
- Tiny Toon Adventures (1990) [uncredited]
- Twinkle (1992)
- Problem Child (1993)
- Wish Kid (1993)
- BattleTech (1994)
- Where on Earth Is Carmen Sandiego? (1994) [uncredited]
- X-Men (1992) [uncredited]
- Street Fighter (1996)
- Pillow People (1996)
- Toxic Crusaders (1991) [uncredited]
- Piggsburgh Piggs (1991)
- Bodyworks (1999) [uncredited]
- Goofballs (2000) [uncredited]
- Stripperella (2003)
- Afro-Kids (2008)

=== Other work ===
- Cowboy in Africa (1965, background extra, stunts)
- Family Affair (1967, background extra)
- The Brady Bunch (1972 - 1974, background extra)
- Archie's Funhouse (1970, background extra)
- The Partridge Family (1972, background extra)
- Star Trek: The Motion Picture (1979, special effects animator)
- T.I.M.E. Team/Cyberneks/Barefoot Countesses (1976, series concepts created by McNeil optioned by Hanna-Barbera Productions, w/development artwork created by Alex Toth)
- Legends of the Superheroes (1977–78, development artist/unpaid character consultant)
- Fury Femmes (1979, feature film optioned by JDL Productions, w/McNeil attached to project as writer, co-producer)
- Star Angels/Tales of the Blue Dolphin/Super Circus Squadron/Thunder Train/ Brat Pack/Merry Meta Mini-Mutants (1984 - 1986, series concepts created by McNeil, optioned by Encore Enterprises and Riverstar Entertainment)
- Amber Ambrosia (1984, animated pilot film production and animated by McNeil for ATI)
- Space Ghost Special (1986, Comico Publishing, credited for 'plot assist')
- Nexus (1991, animated pilot film, produced, written and directed by McNeil for Baron/Rude)
- Comic Book Collecting and History Home Video (1989, associate produced by McNeil for Encore Home Video)
- Super-Action Showcase (1982, animated pilot film created, produced and written by McNeil for Encore Enterprises.)
- Writer, Animation News (1982 - 1992, long running media news column that was published in the Comic Buyers Guide newspaper.)
- Senior Editor/Principal Writer, TOON Magazine (1983 - 1995)
- Co-Author/Publisher: Alex Toth; By Design! (1996, Eisner-nominated book published by McNeil's Gold Medal Productions
- Artemis and S.O.S. Supermodels (1998, animated pilot film created, produced, directed and animated by McNeil for Gold Medal Productions.)
- Rainbow Girl (in production, animated 1/2 hour pilot film for a series. Created, written, co-directed and associate produced by McNeil, currently in mid-production)
- Secret Lives of Women (2008, as 'Fred", reality show participant; topic 'Fetishes and Fantasies')
