= Space Sentinels =

- Directed by: Hal Sutherland
- Voices of: George DiCenzo; Evan C. Kim; Dee Timberlake; Lou Scheimer
- Country of origin: United States
- No. of episodes: 13

Production
- Executive producers: Norm Prescott; Lou Scheimer
- Producer: Don Christensen
- Running time: 22 minutes
- Production company: Filmation

Original release
- Network: NBC
- Release: September 10 – December 3, 1977

Space Sentinels (originally titled Young Sentinels and renamed midway through its only season) is a Saturday morning animated series produced by Filmation which debuted on the American NBC network on September 10, 1977, and ran for thirteen half-hour episodes. The science fiction action series follows a superhero team during missions to protect the Earth.

== Premise ==
Three young Earth people were selected many centuries ago and teleported to another planet, where they were given eternal youth and superpowers. They were trained and returned to Earth, where they are tasked with protecting the planet and its vicinity, similar to the Green Lantern Corps. Hercules and Mercury through superhuman feats became the basis for the mythological Roman deities of the same names. They are joined by Astrea, namesake of the Greek deity but with unrelated powers.

Their base of operations and living quarters is a spaceship hidden within the caldera of a dormant volcano. They are supervised by Sentinel One, a member of a series of sentient supercomputers that command and coordinate Sentinel teams, although the race that gave the Sentinels their powers is ostensibly humanoid. For missions anywhere on Earth, the team is launched through vertical tubes and fly to their destination through the use of rocket belts in their suits, which seem to have intercontinental range as well as hypersonic capability (although Mercury can fly even faster). For interplanetary and interstellar missions, Sentinel One transports them within the spacecraft, which has faster-than-light capability.

The series was set in 1985, eight years after the series' debut; in the episode "The Time Traveler", Hercules and Astrea use time belts to return to "the present" and set the belts for 1985.

== Characters ==
- Hercules: blond-haired and blue-eyed man possesses superhuman strength and is obsessed with exercise and healthy eating. He was voiced by George DiCenzo, who also voiced Sentinel One.
- Mercury: can run and fly purportedly up to the speed of light. Mercury is Chinese and practices martial arts as a hobby. He is usually the jokester. Although capable of flight like the other Sentinels, he often prefers to run at super high speed on the ground. He was voiced by Evan Kim.
- Astrea: can shapeshift into any Earth animal and is the de facto field leader of the team. She was one of the very few black superheroes in cartoons of the era, along with Super Friends' Black Vulcan, and predating Superstretch and Microwoman. She was voiced by Dee Timberlake.
- Sentinel One, nicknamed S-1: a sentient supercomputer integrated into the spaceship who monitors all situations, alerts the team about threats and provides advice and information during missions. He communicates as a large, hairless, holographic head projected within the interior of the spacecraft. Other Sentinel computers in the series include Sentinel Seven (with a female aspect) and the Prime Sentinel, the supreme commander depicted as a bearded, older head.
- MO (Maintenance Operator): "Moe" is a small, boxy service robot in charge of maintaining Sentinel One and the spaceship, similar in purpose to R2-D2 but speaking in colloquial American English, with an appearance somewhat similar to the maintenance drones of Silent Running. He is voiced by Filmation co-founder and executive producer Lou Scheimer. MO is infatuated with Astrea and is often the comic relief.

== Episodes ==
No.	Title	Written by	Original release date
1	"Morpheus: The Sinister Sentinel"	Len Janson & Chuck Menville	September 10, 1977
Morpheus, an earlier Sentinel candidate given the combined powers of the Earth team, returns to steal and replicate the design of Sentinel One in order to attain universal domination.
2	"Space Giants"	Unknown	September 17, 1977
A gang of thieves fake an alien invasion (similar to The War of the Worlds) to hide a plot to steal gold from a government depository, but the situation worsens when the giant robots become self-aware.
3	"The Time Traveler"	Kathleen Barnes & David Wise	September 24, 1977
The Sentinels race to undo the sabotage of a time traveler from the future who wants the international Moon base to fail so his warlike people can prevail in a future conflict.
4	"The Sorceress"	Kathleen Barnes & David Wise	October 1, 1977
A malevolent supercomputer from another dimension seeks to steal an unstable power source from the military.
5	"The Return of Anubis"	Don Glut	October 8, 1977
Anubis, an extraterrestrial scientist who was imprisoned within a pyramid by superstitious people in ancient Egypt, vows revenge after he is freed in modern times.
6	"The Wizard of Od"	J. Michael Reaves	October 15, 1977
An out-of-control "wish machine" in a dimension where myths and stories are real threatens to alter reality.
7	"The Prime Sentinel"	Unknown	October 22, 1977
The Earth Sentinels answer a distress call from another Sentinel team that is losing a battle to protect the Prime Sentinel from an alien energy-based entity.
8	"Commander Nemo"	Kathleen Barnes & David Wise	October 29, 1977
The Sentinels must find Commander Nemo, a scientist turned eco-terrorist with an underwater base who threatens to destroy all polluting industries.
9	"Voyage to the Inner World"	Jerry Winnick	November 5, 1977
Herc and Merc try to save Astrea, who was kidnapped by a secret civilization at the Earth's core to power their protective heat shield.
10	"Loki"	Dale Kirby	November 12, 1977
Loki, a criminal from a Norse-like dimension, steals the Sentinels' spaceship to return to his own world and conquer it.
11	"Fauna"	J. Michael Reaves	November 19, 1977
An animal attack led by a telepathic teenager raised by wolves on a laboratory researching evolution results in an intelligent man-wolf who plans to eliminate mankind.
12	"The Jupiter Spore"	Kathleen Barnes & David Wise	November 26, 1977
A space probe returning samples from Jupiter releases a plant that threatens to overrun the entire planet. They find an embittered alien scientist on Ganymede who is willing to help.
13	"The World Ship"	Douglas Menville	December 3, 1977
A planetoid on a collision course with Earth is found to be an interstellar colony ship. Its crew, once revived, decides to take over the Earth as their new home.

== Production ==
Originally The Young Sentinels, the show was retitled Space Sentinels after several episodes had been broadcast, emphasizing the science fiction aspect to capitalize on the extreme popularity of Star Wars, released earlier the same year. However, as the entire series had already been produced and the dialogue could not be altered, the characters are sometimes addressed as "Young" Sentinels, but never "Space" Sentinels, within the episodes.

When casting the lead voice actors, the producers strove to match the actors' ethnicity to that of the characters. Additional, uncredited actors including Alan Oppenheimer and Ted Cassidy provided voices for guest characters.

Like many Saturday morning children's shows in the 1970s, the scripts emphasized morals including tolerance, understanding, environmental awareness, friendship and teamwork, so many of the opponents were simply misguided or misunderstood rather than actual malevolent villains.

As was the case with virtually all Filmation productions of the 1970s, the theme and background music were credited to Ray Ellis and producer Norm Prescott under their pseudonyms Yvette Blais and Jeff Michael, although Prescott's actual creative involvement is unclear.

== Home media ==
BCI Eclipse LLC (under its Ink & Paint classic animation entertainment brand) (under license from Entertainment Rights) released all 13 episodes of Space Sentinels on DVD in Region 1 on August 22, 2006, along with all five episodes of The Freedom Force, uncut, restored and digitally remastered. This series featured the character Hercules and originally aired as part of Tarzan and the Super 7. In addition, extras include scripts and Spanish language tracks for all 13 episodes, audition tapes, a gallery featuring original images, early presentation images, trivia and interviews with creators Lou Scheimer, Buzz Dixon, Darrell McNeil, J. Michael Reaves, Robert Kline and David Wise.
