= Manta and Moray =

Manta and Moray are a pair of amphibious superheroes who first appeared in a segment of the omnibus animated TV series Tarzan and the Super 7 from 1978 to 1980, on CBS. Filmation produced seven eleven-minute episodes, which were mixed with several other components of the show, including The New Adventures of Batman, Jason of Star Command and The Freedom Force.

== Plot ==
Manta (Monarch of the Deep) is the last survivor of the ancient civilization of Mu, which used to exist in the Pacific Ocean. Mu was destroyed by a terrible explosion, but Manta was engulfed by a wave of mysterious radiation, and placed into suspended animation deep beneath the waves. He was discovered and awoken by Moray, a human female, who became his companion. He is amphibious, but (unlike Moray) cannot be away from water for long periods of time - lest he weaken and die. He can communicate with various animals, on land as well as in the sea.

Moray (birth name unknown) was orphaned when her parents' plane crashed into the sea; the young girl was saved, and subsequently raised, by dolphins. Over the next few years, Moray learned to live in the ocean. Then she discovered and revived Manta, who became her companion. Both pledged themselves to protecting the sea-world from any who would threaten it. An excellent swimmer, Moray can hold her breath for incredibly long periods but (unlike Manta) is vulnerable to deep-water pressure. She wears a leg-baring red wetsuit with white trim, and a matching headband.

Manta and Moray's other companions include Whiskers (a sea lion) and Guppy (a gray whale).

== Episodes ==
1. The Waters of Doom -
2. The Whale Killers -
3. The Warmakers -
4. The Souvenir Hunters -
5. The Freedom Fighters -
6. The Sunken World -
7. Sea of Madness -

== Voices ==
- Joe Stern - Manta
- Joan van Ark - Moray
