= The Batman/Tarzan Adventure Hour =

- Screen capture
- Based on: Batman by: Bob Kane; Bill Finger; Tarzan by: Edgar Rice Burroughs
- Starring: Adam West; Burt Ward; Robert Ridgely
- Country of origin: United States

Production
- Executive producers: Norm Prescott; Lou Scheimer
- Running time: 60 minutes
- Production company: Filmation

Original release
- Network: CBS
- Release: September 10, 1977 – September 2, 1978

Related
- Tarzan, Lord of the Jungle; The New Adventures of Batman; Tarzan and the Super 7

The Batman/Tarzan Adventure Hour is a Filmation animated series that ran on CBS during the 1977–1978 television season. It consisted of the second season of Tarzan, Lord of the Jungle (six new episodes combined with reruns from the first season), and reruns of The New Adventures of Batman aired together.

For the 1978–1980 seasons, the series was re-titled Tarzan and the Super 7 and expanded to ninety-minutes with additional content. For the 1980–1982 seasons, reruns of the Batman and the Super 7 episodes moved to NBC and Tarzan joined The Tarzan/Lone Ranger Adventure Hour.

== Voice cast ==
=== Tarzan, Lord of the Jungle (1977) ===
- Robert Ridgely as Tarzan

=== The New Adventures of Batman (1977) ===
- Adam West as Batman / Bruce Wayne
- Burt Ward as Robin / Dick Grayson
- Melendy Britt as Batgirl / Barbara Gordon, Catwoman / Selina Kyle
- Lou Scheimer as Bat-Mite, Batcomputer
- Lennie Weinrib as Commissioner Gordon, Joker, Penguin, Mr. Freeze, Electro, Chameleon, Zarbor, Clayface, Moonman / Scott Rogers, Professor Bubbles, Sweet Tooth
