= Charlie Dell =

American film, stage and television actor

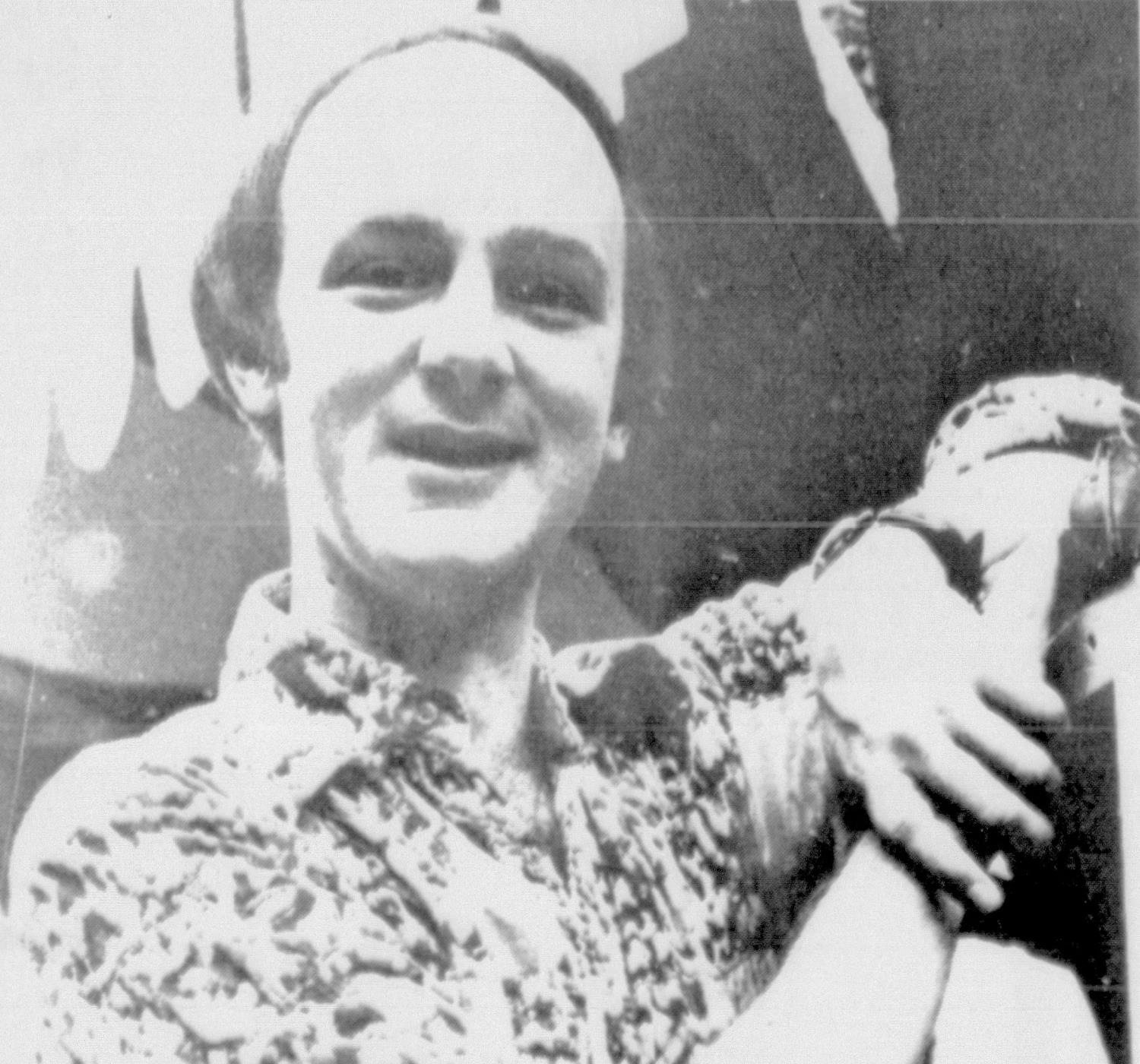
- Dell in 1974
- Born: Charles Ardell Smith; December 31, 1943 (age 82); Nueces County, Texas, U.S.
- Education: North Texas State University
- Occupations: Film, stage and television actor
- Spouse: Jennifer Williams (m. 1993)

Charles Ardell Smith (born October 31, 1943) is an American film, stage and television actor. He is best known for playing Nub Oliver in the American sitcom television series Evening Shade.

== Life and career ==
Dell was born in Nueces County, Texas, and was raised in a dairy farm. He attended Grand Prairie High School, graduating in 1962. After graduating, he attended North Texas State University, earning his degree in drama in 1967. He began his screen career in 1970, appearing in the film A Bullet for Pretty Boy. In 1971, he appeared in the film Fairplay, and in 1972, he appeared in the film Encounter with the Unknown. During his screen career, in 1974, he starred Harry Lambert's son-in-law Charlie, starring along with Robert Cummings in the stage play Never Too Late.

Later in his career, in 1978, Dell starred as Professor E.J. Parafoot in the CBS science fiction television series Jason of Star Command, starring along with Craig Littler, Sid Haig, Susan Pratt, James Doohan, Tamara Dobson and John Russell. After the series ended in 1979, he guest-starred in television programs including Hardcastle and McCormick, Silver Spoons, Fantasy Island, ALF, Married... with Children and Family Matters, and played the recurring role of Emery Potter in the CBS action comedy television series The Dukes of Hazzard. From 1990 to 1994, he starred as Nub Oliver in the CBS sitcom television series Evening Shade, starring along with Burt Reynolds, Marilu Henner, Hal Holbrook, Ossie Davis, Charles Durning and Michael Jeter. He also appeared in films such as Fight Club, The Sweetest Thing, In & Out, Invaders from Mars, Love at First Bite and Bubble Boy. In 2004, he voiced Ollie the Pig in the film Home on the Range. Aside from acting, he was a comedian.

== Personal life ==
In 1993, Dell married Jennifer Williams, an actress.
