= Reunion (1980 film) =

- Genre: Drama
- Written by: Sue Millburn
- Directed by: Russ Mayberry
- Starring: Kevin Dobson; Joanna Cassidy; Linda Hamilton
- Theme music composer: George Romanis
- Country of origin: United States
- Original language: English

Production
- Producer: Barry J. Weitz
- Production locations: Grant High School - 2245 NE 36th Avenue, Portland, Oregon
- Cinematography: Héctor R. Figueroa
- Editor: Ira Heymann
- Running time: 100 minutes
- Production companies: Barry Weitz Films; Columbia Pictures Television

Original release
- Network: CBS
- Release: October 14, 1980

Reunion is a 1980 television film directed by Russ Mayberry and starring Kevin Dobson, Joanna Cassidy, and Linda Hamilton.

== Plot ==
Don Hollander (Kevin Dobson) is a Los Angeles married father of two teens, entrenched in a midlife crisis. Once happily married and in top condition, working as a space engineer, Don is now unemployed and constantly fights with his wife Evelyn (Melendy Britt) over how to discipline their rebellious children - Evelyn feeling they should accept that they are sexually active and using drugs, whereas Don has more conservative thoughts. When he receives a letter informing him about the twentieth reunion of his high school 3000 miles away from Los Angeles, Don is encouraged by Evelyn to attend it, feeling that they could use a break from each other. Going through the year book, he immediately contacts his high school sweetheart Peggy Sager (Joanna Cassidy), who is now a divorced mother and excited to catch up with Don. Though thrilled to see her, Peggy's aging looks remind Don of his own decline and he becomes more attracted to her 17-year-old daughter Anne (Linda Hamilton), a high school cheerleader who is in a relationship with the basketball team's star player Steve Cowan (Nick Cassavetes).

Don quickly grows accustomed to his home town, where he is worshiped by the townspeople for being the high school team's star player in 1959, shared with his pals Vincent Scozzola (George DiCenzo), Walker Hanson (Rick Lenz) and Jack Owens (Nicholas Pryor). All men try to re-live their glory years and decide to compete against the current high school basketball team. Meanwhile, despite better judgment, Peggy sleeps with Don on his first night there. The next morning, Don gets more acquainted with Anne, who has developed a crush on him and even accompanies him to meet with his father Bob (Lew Ayres). She even distances herself from Steve as a way of spending more time with Don.

Throughout the film, Don multiple times shows his discontent in getting older and criticizes others for not being young. He even attends a high school prom to dance with Anne, shocking Peggy who suspects that a romance is going on. Don further upsets one with conservative thoughts, such as his opinion on homosexuality, which saddens his closeted friend Walker. Simultaneously, he finds in John Wiepert (George Wyner) the fifth player of his team. Over the phone he informs his wife on his basketball match, but she angers him by saying that he is too old to compete against teenagers. He is interrupted by Anne, who comes by late at night to seduce him. Even though they quickly kiss, Don sends her away. She stays out all night, prompting Peggy to think that her daughter is having sex with Steve. As Don learns about these rumours the next day during his basketball game, he gets distraught and plays a rough game against Steve. Nevertheless, he wins the game and kisses Anne in public during a short moment of joy.

Peggy witnesses the kiss and confronts Don with his immoral behavior. Don explains his actions by claiming that Anne is the only girl in his life to boost his ego. Don decides to leave town and returns to Los Angeles

== Cast ==
- Kevin Dobson as Don Hollander
- Joanna Cassidy as Peggy Sager
- Linda Hamilton as Anne Samoorian
- George DiCenzo as Vincent Scozzola
- Conchata Ferrell as Toni Owens
- Rick Lenz as Walker Hanson
- Nick Cassavetes as Steve Cowan
- Nicholas Pryor as Jack Owens
- George Wyner as John Wiepert
- Lew Ayres as Bob Hollander
- Melendy Britt as Evelyn Hollander
