= The Adventures of Batman =

- Title card
- Also known as: Batman with Robin the Boy Wonder
- Based on: Batman by: Bob Kane; Bill Finger
- Directed by: Hal Sutherland
- Voices of: Olan Soule; Casey Kasem; Ted Knight; Jane Webb
- Narrated by: Ted Knight
- Theme music composer: John Marion Gart; (credited as; "John Marion")
- Country of origin: United States
- Original language: English
- No. of seasons: 1
- No. of episodes: 17

Production
- Executive producer: Allen Ducovny
- Producers: Norm Prescott; Lou Scheimer
- Production companies: Filmation; Ducovny Productions; National Periodical Publications

Original release
- Network: CBS
- Release: September 14, 1968 – January 4, 1969

Related
- The New Adventures of Batman; The Batman/Superman Hour; The New Scooby-Doo Movies

The Adventures of Batman is an animated television series produced by Lou Scheimer's Filmation studios. It consists of the 12-minute Batman segments from The Batman/Superman Hour, which premiered on September 14, 1968, on CBS. The following season, in 1969, a 30-minute version that omitted the Superman and Superboy segments aired as Batman with Robin the Boy Wonder.

Olan Soule was the voice of Batman and is most likely best known for the role. Casey Kasem, notable for his voiceover and radio work, was the voice of Robin.

Batman would next appear in two The New Scooby-Doo Movies crossovers and various iterations of Super Friends (featuring Soule and Kasem reprising their Batman and Robin roles), and would next appear in a self-titled series with The New Adventures of Batman in 1977.

== Voice Cast ==
- Olan Soule as Batman, Alfred Pennyworth
- Casey Kasem as Robin, Chief O'Hara, Mayor of Gotham City, Additional Voices
- Jane Webb as Batgirl, Catwoman
- Ted Knight as Narrator, James Gordon, Penguin, Riddler, Mr. Freeze, Scarecrow, Mad Hatter, Tweedledum and Tweedledee, Simon the Pieman, Dollman, Judge
- Larry Storch as The Joker

== Episodes ==
The Batman half of The Batman/Superman Hour consisted of one story presented in two 6 1/2-minute segments and one story in a single 6 1/2-minute segment. 34 stories were produced (two-segment stories are listed first in each pairing):

No.	Title	Written by	Original release date
1	"My Crime Is Your Crime"	Denis Marks	September 14, 1968
1	"A Bird Out of Hand"	George Kashdan	September 14, 1968
My Crime Is Your Crime: Batman and Robin are thrown for a loop when they arrest the Joker and the Penguin for crimes they did not commit. A Bird Out of Hand: The Penguin unexpectedly goes straight.
2	"The Cool, Cruel Mr. Freeze"	Denis Marks	September 21, 1968
2	"The Joke's on Robin"	George Kashdan	September 21, 1968
The Cool, Cruel Mr. Freeze: Mr. Freeze causes havoc in his quest to ransom $1 billion from the city and he uses a captured whale for his caper. The Joke's on Robin: Robin seems to lose his skills after he rescues a man from drowning thanks to the Joker. This segment features Batgirl.
3	"How Many Herring in a Wheelbarrow?"	Bill Keenen	September 28, 1968
3	"In Again, Out Again Penguin"	Bill Keenen	September 28, 1968
How Many Herring in a Wheelbarrow?: The Joker raids technology firms to build a powerful solar mirror he can use as a laser weapon. In Again, Out Again Penguin: The Penguin commits crimes, even though he is supposedly incarcerated, and frames Batman and Robin for them.
4	"The Nine Lives of Batman"	Denis Marks	October 5, 1968
4	"Long John Joker"	Bob Haney	October 5, 1968
The Nine Lives of Batman: Catwoman traps Batman and exposes him to a radioactive gas that will allow her to identify him in his secret identity. Long John Joker: The Joker makes a movie about pirates as cover to find the haul from a long-forgotten armored car theft. This segment features Batgirl. Note: The first segment of this episode features edited dialogue — in the show's syndicated run, as Catwoman and her henchmen pillage a jewelry exchange, it includes a line of narration, "The feline felon and her terrible tabbies indulge in an orgy of theft". This was changed in subsequent prints to "a spree of stealing".
5	"Bubi, Bubi, Who's Got the Ruby?"	Bill Keenen	October 12, 1968
5	"1001 Faces of the Riddler"	George Kashdan	October 12, 1968
Bubi, Bubi, Who's Got the Ruby?: Bruce Wayne is captured by the Penguin in the robbery of a valuable ruby. Unfortunately for Penguin, Catwoman is also after the ruby. This segment features Batgirl. 1001 Faces of the Riddler: The Riddler becomes an expert at disguises to fool Batman and Robin.
6	"The Big Birthday Caper"	Bob Haney	October 19, 1968
6	"Two Penguins Too Many"	Bill Keenen	October 19, 1968
The Big Birthday Caper: The Riddler and the Penguin try to expose Batman by staging a mammoth birthday party for him and wealthy businessman Bruce Wayne. Two Penguins Too Many: Real penguins wind up helping the Penguin and the Joker to outwit Batman and Robin.
7	"Partners in Peril"	George Kashdan	October 26, 1968
7	"The Underworld Underground Caper"	Bill Butler	October 26, 1968
Partners in Peril: A deadly contest is staged by the Joker, the Penguin, and the Riddler to one-up each other and gain control of Gotham City's criminal empire. This segment features Batgirl. The Underworld Underground Caper: The Riddler and Catwoman use an underground drill to commit robberies to trap Batman and Robin.
8	"Hizzoner the Joker"	Denis Marks	November 2, 1968
8	"Freeze's Frozen Vikings"	Denis Marks	November 2, 1968
Hizzoner the Joker: The Joker runs for mayor of Gotham City and is able to win. Freeze's Frozen Vikings: Mr. Freeze uses a Vikings hoax to commit robberies.
9	"The Crime Computer"	Denis Marks	November 9, 1968
9	"The Great Scarecrow Scare"	Bill Butler	November 9, 1968
The Crime Computer: The Penguin seizes a mammoth computer to use to outwit Batman and Robin. The Great Scarecrow Scare: The Scarecrow steals a painting and captures Batgirl as part of his plot to dispose of the Dynamic Duo.
10	"A Game of Cat and Mouse"	Bill Keenen	November 16, 1968
10	"Beware of Living Dolls"	Bob Haney	November 16, 1968
A Game of Cat and Mouse: Catwoman steals the Crown Jewels, which the Joker is also after. Beware of Living Dolls: Dollman uses his dolls to pull off a crime spree.
11	"Will the Real Robin Please Stand Up"	Oscar Bensol	November 23, 1968
11	"He Who Swipes the Ice, Goes to the Cooler"	Bill Keenen	November 23, 1968
Will the Real Robin Please Stand Up: A youth who bears a stunning resemblance to Robin is used by Catwoman when he ends up with amnesia. He Who Swipes the Ice, Goes to the Cooler: Mr. Freeze's diamond heist goes wrong.
12	"Simon the Pieman"	Denis Marks	November 30, 1968
12	"A Mad, Mad Tea Party"	George Kashdan	November 30, 1968
Simon the Pieman: A flamboyant criminal pastry chef named Simon the Pieman and his gang steal valuables under the cover of the fairgrounds after they had gotten the Joker, the Penguin, the Riddler, Catwoman, and Mr. Freeze out of the way. This segment features Batgirl. A Mad, Mad Tea Party: The Mad Hatter starts an Alice in Wonderland-based gang in a plot to steal a priceless antique teapot to use as part of his mad tea party.
13	"From Catwoman with Love"	Bob Haney	December 7, 1968
13	"Perilous Playthings"	Oscar Bensol	December 7, 1968
From Catwoman with Love: Catwoman sends Batman a cat for Valentine's Day, a cat with a collar that gives off radio waves. This segment features Batgirl. Perilous Playthings: Catwoman and her henchmen crash the production of Tom Thumb in Toyland and use toy-based plots to defeat the Dynamic Duo.
14	"A Perfidious Pieman Is Simon"	Oscar Bensol	December 14, 1968
14	"Cool, Cruel Christmas Caper"	Bob Haney	December 14, 1968
A Perfidious Pieman Is Simon: Simon the Pieman steals four million Turkish coins and is pursued to an electrical plant. Features Batgirl. Cool, Cruel Christmas Caper: Mr. Freeze disguises himself as Santa Claus.
15	"The Fiendishly Frigid Fraud"	Denis Marks	December 21, 1968
15	"Enter the Judge"	Denis Marks	December 21, 1968
The Fiendishly Frigid Fraud: A freak bombardment of meteors made of pure ice allows Mr. Freeze to stage a hoax. Enter the Judge: An international criminal who is incarcerated on the island prison Satan Island ends up escaping disguised as a judge when his pardon is denied. Now he is going around crashing criminal trials, gaining the Cosgrove gang and other low-level crooks as his jury henchmen in a plot to eliminate all crimefighters.
16	"The Jigsaw Jeopardy"	Oscar Bensol	December 28, 1968
16	"Wrath of the Riddler"	Oscar Bensol	December 28, 1968
The Jigsaw Jeopardy: The Riddler plans to blow up Gotham City's art gallery and winds up trapping The Caped Crusaders as well. This segment features Batgirl. Wrath of the Riddler: The Riddler uses a construction site as his hideout. This segment features Batgirl.
17	"It Takes Two to Make a Team"	Denis Marks	January 4, 1969
17	"Opera Buffa"	Bob Haney	January 4, 1969
It Takes Two to Make a Team: The Joker, the Penguin, and the Riddler are after an Inca treasure map. They plan to break up the Dynamic Duo by making Robin jealous of Batgirl. Opera Buffa: The Joker seemingly traps Batman and Robin, but is haunted by their apparent ghosts when he tries to steal a valuable tiara at an opera.

== Popular culture ==
The original villain Simon the Pieman makes a cameo appearance alongside Sweet Tooth in the Batman: The Brave and the Bold episode "A Bat Divided".

== Home media ==
In 1985, Warner Home Video released five selected episodes of the series on VHS in the "Super Powers" video collection along with Aquaman, Superboy and Superman.

In 1993, in Australia only, Warner Home Video released a four-volume VHS collection with four stories per volume.

In 2008, episodes were released as digital downloads on iTunes, and streaming on Amazon Video.

In June 2014, Warner Home Video (via DC Entertainment) released all 34 original, uncut broadcast episodes on DVD in Region 1 in a 2-disc set entitled The Adventures of Batman.

In September 2021, the show was available on HBO Max in Latin America, in celebration for Batman Day.

Warner Bros. Home Entertainment released the series on Blu-ray on February 28, 2023.
