= 1980–81 United States network television schedule (late night) =

These are the late-night schedules for the three U.S. television networks during the 1980–81 season. All times are Eastern and Pacific.

PBS is not included, as member television stations had local flexibility with most of their schedules, and broadcast times for network shows might have varied. ABC and CBS are not included on the weekend schedules because those networks did not offer late-night programming on the weekend.

Talk/variety shows are highlighted in yellow, network news programs in gold, and local news & programs are highlighted in white background.

In September 1980, the Federal Communications Commission (FCC) relaxed its rules for late-night television, allowing television stations to remain on the air after normal signoff to experiment with showing visual slides and slow-moving text with background music or no audio at all.

== Monday-Friday ==
-		11:00 PM	11:30 PM	12:00 AM	12:30 AM	1:00 AM	1:30 AM	2:00 AM	2:30 AM	3:00 AM	3:30 AM	4:00 AM	4:30 AM	5:00 AM	5:30 AM
ABC	Fall	local programming	ABC News Nightline (Mon.-Thur.)	ABC Late Night (Mon.-Thur.)/Fridays (Fri, 11:30-12:40)			Local
ABC	Spring	local programming	ABC News Nightline	ABC Late Night (Mon.-Thur.)/Fridays (Fri, 12:00-1:10)			Local
CBS		local programming	The CBS Late Movie				Local
NBC	Fall	local programming	The Tonight Show Starring Johnny Carson		The Tomorrow Show* (Mon.-Thur.)/The Midnight Special (Fri)			local programming
NBC	May	local programming	The Tonight Show Starring Johnny Carson		Tomorrow Coast to Coast (Mon.-Thur.)/SCTV Network 90 (Fri)			local programming

(*) renamed Tomorrow Coast to Coast in January

== Saturday ==
-	11:00 PM	11:30 PM	12:00 AM	12:30 AM	1:00 AM	1:30 AM	2:00 AM	2:30 AM	3:00 AM	3:30 AM	4:00 AM	4:30 AM	5:00 AM	5:30 AM
NBC	local programming	Saturday Night Live '80			local programming

== Sunday ==
-	11:00 PM	11:30 PM	12:00 AM	12:30 AM	1:00 AM	1:30 AM	2:00 AM	2:30 AM	3:00 AM	3:30 AM	4:00 AM	4:30 AM	5:00 AM	5:30 AM
NBC	local programming	NBC Late Night Movie				local programming

== By network ==
=== ABC ===
Returning Series

- ABC Late Night
- Fridays
- Nightline

Not returning from 1979 to 1980

- The Iran Crisis: America Held Hostage

=== CBS ===
Returning Series

- The CBS Late Movie

=== NBC ===
Returning Series

- The Midnight Special
- NBC Late Night Movie
- Saturday Night Live '80
- The Tomorrow Show / Tomorrow Coast to Coast
- The Tonight Show Starring Johnny Carson

New Series

- SCTV Network 90
