= Melendy Britt =

American actress

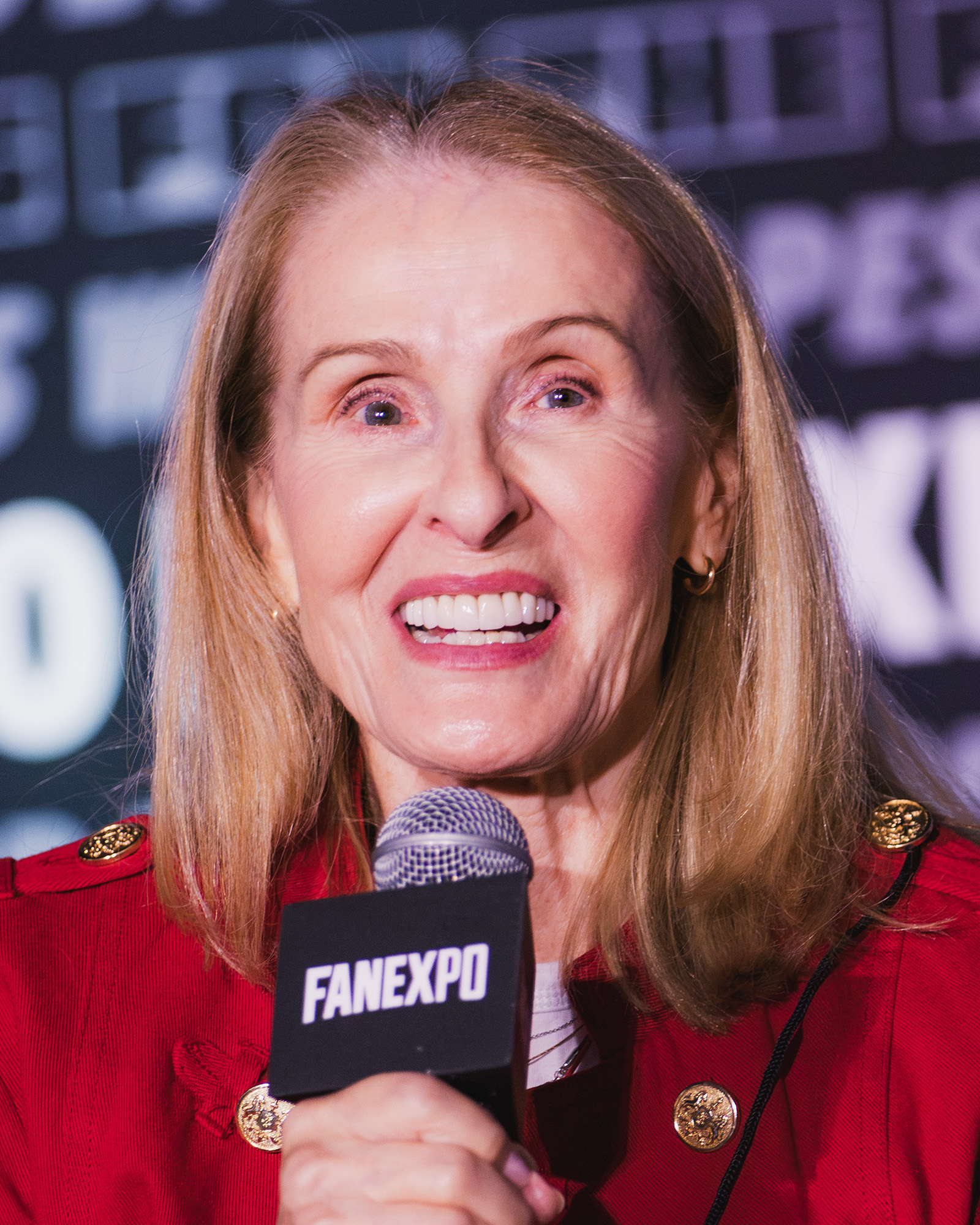
- Britt in 2026
- Born: Harriet Melendy; 1943 or 1944 (age 82–83)
- Occupation: Actress
- Years active: 1967–present
- Children: 2

Melendy Britt (born Harriet Melendy; 1943 or 1944) is an American actress. She is best known for her voice work in animation, particularly for voicing She-Ra in the 1985 animated series She-Ra: Princess of Power and for her extensive work in various Filmation productions. Britt has also appeared in live-action television and film roles, contributing to a diverse body of work throughout her career since the 1970s.

== Early years ==
Britt was born Harriet Melendy in North Carolina and moved to Texas with her family in 1949. Her mother remarried after a divorce from her merchant-mariner father. She gained early experience on children's television and began performing on stage when she was 12 years old. Venues included the Alley Theater and The Playhouse in Houston. While she was a student at Lamar High School in Houston, she appeared regularly on the program Teen Time Party on KPRC-TV. In the summer of 1961 she was one of a dozen apprentices who learned various aspects of theatrical production at the Alley Theatre in Houston. She graduated from Lamar in 1961.

== Career ==
Britt's most notable animated work is for Filmation, voicing characters such as She-Ra, and the second animated Batgirl (Jane Webb was the first). She also provided the voice for Penny, would-be love interest and aide to Plastic Man on The Plastic Man Comedy/Adventure Show, which was produced by Ruby-Spears. She was also the voice of Kanna in Avatar: The Last Airbender.

On television Britt was seen in Then Came Bronson and The Psychiatrist. She also appeared in three different roles in three episodes of The Rockford Files, and on Cheers she played Kelly Gaines' mother, Roxanne Gaines, in the episode "Woody or Won't He". Her film credits include roles in Gray Lady Down (1978) and Being There (1979).

Britt portrayed an alcoholic mother in "Francesca, Baby", an episode of ABC Afterschool Special in October 1976.

Britt's work on stage included performing in the farce-comedy Once Over Nightly at the On Broadway theater in San Francisco. and in the musical comedy Bottoms Up '68 at the Hotel Sahara-Tahoe. Her work in Carnival at the Playhouse in Houston led a critic to write, "Harriet Melendy, as The Incomparable Rosalie, a jealous beauty with a troublesome liaison, is another solid hit — a definite wow in the show's funniest song, 'Here's to a Son', let us say."

== Personal life ==
She married singer Jimmy Britt, and they had two children.

== Filmography ==
=== Film ===
Year	Title	Role	Notes
1970	The Lawyer	Ann Greer	
1978	Gray Lady Down	Liz Bennett	
1979	Being There	Sophie	
1985	The Secret of the Sword	Adora/She-Ra, Catra, Hunga the Harpy	Voice
1985	Girls of the Moulin Rouge	Narrator	Documentary
2015	Hotel Transylvania 2	Additional voices	

=== Television ===
Year	Title	Role	Notes
1970	Then Came Bronson	Marcia Ford	Episode: "The Mountain"
1971	The Interns	Rose	Episode: "Changes"
1971	Men at Law	Tina Edwards	Episode: "Yesterday Is But a Dream"
1971	Sarge	Candy Mills	Episode: "Psst! Wanna Buy a Dirty Picture?"
1971	Longstreet	Lenore Crowley	Episode: "The Girl with the Broom"
1971–1972	Mannix	Various roles	3 episodes
1972	The Brian Keith Show	Claire Wells	Episode: "Little Boy Flu"
1973	Ironside	Rona Bartlet	Episode: "A Special Person"
1974	Kojak	Joan Marly	Episode: "Slay Ride"
1974	Police Woman	Mary Kay	Episode: "Requiem for Bored Wives"
1975	They Only Come Out at Night	Mrs. Owens	Television film
1975–1977	The Rockford Files	Various roles	3 episodes
1976	Bronk	Beth	Episode: "Target: Unknown"
1976	Family	Mrs. Richardson	Episode: "Monday Is Forever"
1976	The Tony Randall Show	Mrs. Jenkins	Episode: "Pilot"
1976	ABC Afterschool Special	Various roles	2 episodes
1976	Starsky & Hutch	Janice Drew	Episode: "The Specialist"
1977	The New Adventures of Batman	Barbara Gordon / Batgirl / Catwoman	Voice, 16 episodes
1978	Barnaby Jones	Phyllis Hunter	Episode: "Deadly Sanctuary"
1978	The Love Boat	Georgina	1 episode
1978–1979	Tarzan and the Super 7	Batgirl / Catwoman	Voice, 33 episodes
1979–1980	The Plastic Man Comedy/Adventure Show	Penny / Chief	Voice, 19 episodes
1979–1982	The New Adventures of Flash Gordon	Princess Aura	Voice, 24 episodes
1980	Mother and Daughter: The Loving War	Dinah Drake	Television film
1980	The Incredible Hulk	Joan Singer	Episode: "Deathmask"
1980	Reunion	Evelyn Hollander	Television film
1980	A Snow White Christmas	Wicked Queen	Voice; television film
1981	Taxi	Janine	Episode: "Jim Joins the Network"
1981–1982	Shannon	Patty	2 episodes
1982	Flash Gordon: The Greatest Adventure of All	Princess Aura	Voice, television film
1984	Matt Houston	Sheila	Episode: "Stolen"
1985	The Transformers	Alana	Voice, episode: "Sea Change"
1985	He-Man & She-Ra: A Christmas Special	Adora, She-Ra, Catra, Mermista, Castaspella, Octavia, Hunga, Jewlestar	Voice, television film
1985–1987	She-Ra: Princess of Power	Adora, She-Ra, Catra, Mermista, Castaspella, Octavia, Hunga, Jewlestar	Voice, 93 episodes
1986	Falcon Crest	Skylar Kimball	2 episodes
1990	Cheers	Roxanne Gaines	Episode: "Woody or Won't He"
1992	Life Goes On	Colette Swanson	Episode: "Corky's Romance"
1993	Star	Priscilla Barclay	Television film
1994	Weird Science	Marcia Donnelly	5 episodes
2000	Gilmore Girls	Gloria	Episode: "Kill Me Now"
2001	Jack & Jill	Cecilia Barrett	Episode: "Caution: Parents Crossing"
2003	The Wild Thornberrys	Fox	Voice, episode: "Sir Nigel: Part 2"
2005	Avatar: The Last Airbender	Kanna	Voice, 2 episodes
2005	The Young and the Restless	Dr. Carlene Woods	2 episodes
2013	Last Man Standing	Dolores	Episode: "The Fight"
2017	Michael Jackson's Halloween	Bernice	Voice; television film
