= Jason of Star Command =

American television series

- Created by: Arthur H. Nadel
- Directed by: Arthur H. Nadel
- Presented by: Filmation
- Starring: Craig Littler; Charlie Dell; Sid Haig; Susan O'Hanlon; James Doohan; Tamara Dobson; John Russell
- Composers: Yvette Blais; Jeff Michael
- Country of origin: United States
- No. of seasons: 2
- No. of episodes: 28

Production
- Executive producers: Norm Prescott; Lou Scheimer
- Producer: Arthur H. Nadel
- Running time: 30 min. (with commercials)
- Production company: Filmation

Original release
- Network: CBS
- Release: September 9, 1978 – December 1, 1979

Related
- Space Academy

Jason of Star Command is a 1978–79 live-action television series by Filmation. The series revolves around the exploits of space adventurer Jason (Craig Littler) and his colleagues, including Professor E.J. Parsafoot (Charlie Dell) and the pocket robot "Wiki" (formally W1K1). The series also stars Sid Haig as the evil Dragos, and in the first season, James Doohan. Jason was inspired by Filmation's 1977 live-action show Space Academy and used the same robot, Peepo.

== Opening narration ==
Danger hides in the stars! This is the world of Jason of Star Command. A space-age soldier of fortune determined to stop the most sinister force in the universe: Dragos, master of the cosmos. Aiding Jason in his battle against evil is a talented team of experts, all working together in a secret section of Space Academy. Jason of Star Command!

== Overview ==
=== Season 1 ===
Its first season, which was a segment of Tarzan and the Super 7, was done in the style of the movie serials of the past, telling a single overall story with 16 "chapters" around 15 minutes in length, each ending in a cliffhanger. The second season was a stand-alone, half-hour series. Filmation later revisited the serial format with both their rendition of The New Adventures of Flash Gordon and "The Great Space Chase" segment of The New Adventures of Mighty Mouse and Heckle & Jeckle.

Jason flies a "Starfire". This fast spaceship has a "star pod" that can separate from the ship in an emergency. Dragos commands the vast "Dragonship", similar to the Space Academy in that it was built on a large asteroid. Dragos's fighter craft are unmanned drones. This was a choice made by the series' producers and repeatedly pointed out in the plot, so that the destruction of these craft would not involve killing a pilot. The series aired on Saturday mornings, and deadly violence had to be kept to a minimum.

=== Season 2 ===
James Doohan left the series at the end of the first season to join the rest of the original Star Trek cast in Star Trek: The Motion Picture. He was replaced by John Russell, who played the blue-skinned "by the book" Commander Stone. Originally, Jonathan Harris was to have reprised his role as Commander Gampu from Space Academy, but according to the DVD booklet, he "had a falling out" with Filmation, thus the creation of Doohan's character.

The asteroid prop used for Space Academy was reused for Jason of Star Command, where Star Command was stated to be "in a secret section of Space Academy". Other than the appearance of the robot Peepo and the appearance of a Seeker shuttle piloted by Lt. Matt Prentiss (John Berwick), no references were made to the characters or situations in Space Academy.

After the first-run episodes that were shown on CBS during the fall lineup on CBS Saturday Morning, Jason of Star Command was replaced by Shazam! in January 1980. Jason of Star Command moved to Sunday morning at 8:30 am ET for a year and two months, before returning to Saturday at 1:00 pm ET, right before 30 Minutes.

== Episodes ==
=== Season 1 ===
The 15-minute segments from Tarzan and the Super 7:

1. "Attack of the Dragonship" (written by Samuel A. Peeples)
2. "Prisoner of Dragos" (written by Samuel A. Peeples)
3. "Escape from Dragos" (written by Samuel A. Peeples)
4. "A Cry for Help" (written by Samuel A. Peeples)
5. "Wiki to the Rescue" (written by Samuel A. Peeples)
6. "Planet of the Lost" (written by Samuel A. Peeples)
7. "Marooned in Time" (written by David Villaire)
8. "Attack of the Dragons" (written by Don Heckman)
9. "Peepo's Last Chance" (written by Don Heckman)
10. "The Disappearing Man" (written by Sid Morse)
11. "The Haunted Planet" (written by Ted Pedersen and Martha Humphreys)
12. "Escape from Kesh" (written by Chuck Menville)
13. "Return of the Creature" (written by Len Janson)
14. "Peepo on Trial" (written by Chuck Menville)
15. "The Trojan Horse" (written by Ted Pedersen and Martha Humphreys)
16. "The Victory of Star Command" (written by Don Heckman)

=== Season 2 ===
The 30-minute episodes, aired as Jason of Star Command:

1. "Mission to the Stars" (written by Ted Pedersen)
2. "Frozen in Space" (written by Margaret Armen)
3. "Web of the Star Witch" (written by Ted Pedersen)
4. "Beyond the Stars!" (written by Samuel A. Peeples)
5. "Secret of the Ancients" (written by Samuel A. Peeples)
6. "The Power of the Star Disk" (written by Samuel A. Peeples)
7. "Through the Stargate" (written by Lynn Barker)
8. "Face to Face" (written by Don Heckman)
9. "Phantom Force" (story by Joe Mazzuca, teleplay by Ted Pedersen)
10. "Little Girl Lost" (written by Jackson Gillis)
11. "Mimi's Secret" (story by Jackson Gillis, teleplay by Jackson Gillis and Michael Halperin)
12. "Battle for Freedom" (written by Alf Harris)

== DVD release ==
BCI Eclipse LLC, under license from Entertainment Rights, released the entire series on DVD in Region 1 on May 8, 2007. The three-disc set contains all 28 episodes from seasons one and two, digitally remastered for optimum audio and video quality, and presented uncut and in story continuity order, as well as an array of special features including commentary tracks and photo and art galleries. The galleries also contain characters sheets for the proposed but never produced animated version of the show.

As of 2011, this release has been discontinued and is out of print, as BCI Eclipse has ceased operations.
