= Superstretch and Microwoman =

American cartoon series

Superstretch and Microwoman are a fictional, shape-shifting, husband and wife crime-fighting team, shown as a segment of Tarzan and the Super 7 television series.

== Fictional biography ==
On the surface Chris and Christy Cross were just your average suburban couple. But when they sprang into action, Chris could take virtually any shape (such as a plane, a robot, a rubber ball, a perfect double of a villain, etc.). Christy could, as her name implied, shrink to microscopic size. Frequently tagging along on their adventures was their little dog, Trouble. The duo was a new concept for superhero cartoons in that they were the first African-American man/woman duo, and that they did not change into superhero costumes when the need to use their powers came, or adopt a "secret identity", simply wearing ordinary clothes. They were generally seen in lightweight adventures that were resolved simply, although a few episodes had them dealing with major crimes or a supernatural evil. Sometimes if the need arose, Christy and Chris would use their powers not to fight crime, but to accomplish household chores.

== First appearance ==
- Superstretch and Microwoman – a segment of Tarzan and the Super 7 (Filmation for CBS, September 9, 1978)

== Episodes ==
No.	Title	Original release date
1	"Bad Things Come in Small Packages"	September 9, 1978
2	"The Ringmaster"	September 16, 1978
3	"The Toymaker"	September 23, 1978
4	"Future Tense"	September 30, 1978
5	"Phantom of the Sewers"	October 7, 1978
6	"Shadow on the Swamp"	October 14, 1978
7	"The Great Candy Bar Caper"	October 21, 1978
8	"The Superstretch Bowl"	October 28, 1978
9	"Superstarch and Magnawoman"	November 4, 1978
10	"Sugar Spice"	November 11, 1978
11	"Gnome Man's Land"	November 18, 1978

== Voices ==
- Chris/Superstretch voiced by Ty Henderson
- Christy/Microwoman voiced by Kim Hamilton
- Lt. Buzz Tucker voiced by Howard Morris
