= The Freedom Force (TV series) =

- 2006 DVD release
- Written by: Len Janson; Chuck Menville
- Voices of: Michael Bell; Bob Denison; Diane Pershing
- Country of origin: United States
- No. of episodes: 5

Production
- Executive producers: Norm Prescott; Lou Scheimer
- Producer: Don Christensen
- Running time: 12 minutes
- Production company: Filmation

Original release
- Network: CBS
- Release: September 9 – October 7, 1978

The Freedom Force is a 1978 animated television series produced by Filmation and aired on CBS as a segment of Tarzan and the Super 7. It showcased a superhero team gathered from around the world by the heroine Isis to help fight evil. While the heroine had previously appeared in the live-action television series The Secrets of Isis, actress Joanna Cameron did not reprise her role for the animated series.

Only five episodes were produced.

== Team members ==
- Isis, goddess of the elements
- Hercules, world's mightiest man, alumnus of the Space Sentinels
- Merlin, master of magic
- Sinbad, hero of the seven seas
- Super Samurai, giant of justice, alter ego of the young Japanese boy Toshi

Hercules often rides Pegasus, Merlin uses a flying carpet, and Sinbad's sidekick Lamprey offers comic relief.

== Voice cast ==
- Michael Bell: Merlin, Toshi / Super Samurai, Sinbad
- Diane Pershing: Isis
- Bob Denison: Hercules

== Episodes ==
1. The Dragon Riders (written by Don Heckman)
  The Freedom Force must end a war between two tribes who dogfight in the air.
2. The Scarlet Samurai (written by Gerry Boudreau)
  Toshi's new friend is jealous of his powers, and an evil wizard plans to exploit this for revenge against the boy's father, a wizard who defeated the evil wizard long ago.
3. The Plant Soldiers (written by Tom Swale)
  An evil wizard steals the Necklace of Osiris using it to control the Nile and a magical army of walking plant soldiers.
4. Pegasus' Odyssey (written by Gerry Boudreau)
  Pegasus is captured by an evil sorceress out to seek revenge on Hercules.
5. The Robot (written by Buzz Dixon)
  An inventor's mechanical giant is out to prove itself more powerful than the Freedom Force.

== Home media ==
BCI Eclipse LLC (under its Ink & Paint classic animation entertainment brand) (under license from Entertainment Rights) released all 5 episodes of The Freedom Force on DVD in Region 1 on August 22, 2006, along with all 13 episodes of Space Sentinels, presented uncut, digitally remastered for optimum audio and video quality, and in story continuity order, an earlier series that featured several of the same characters. The digitally-remastered presentation features scripts and Spanish language tracks for all 5 episodes, a gallery featuring original images, early presentation images, trivia and interviews with creators Lou Scheimer, Buzz Dixon, Darrell McNeil, Michael Reaves, Robert Kline and David Wise, as well as numerous special features related to Space Sentinels and Filmation in general.

As of 2009, this release has been discontinued and is out of print as BCI Eclipse has ceased operations.

In addition, a single episode, "The Plant Soldiers", was included as a bonus feature on the DVD release of the live-action The Secrets of Isis series.
