= Tarzan, Lord of the Jungle =

Animated television series

- Based on: Tarzan by Edgar Rice Burroughs
- Directed by: Don Towsley
- Starring: Robert Ridgely
- Country of origin: United States
- No. of episodes: 36

Production
- Executive producers: Norm Prescott; Lou Scheimer
- Producer: Don Christensen
- Running time: 22 minutes (seasons 1–2, 4); 11 minutes (season 3)
- Production company: Filmation

Original release
- Network: CBS
- Release: September 11, 1976 – November 3, 1979

Related
- The Batman/Tarzan Adventure Hour

Tarzan, Lord of the Jungle is an American animated series created by the Filmation studio for Saturday mornings on CBS, starting in 1976. This was the first animated series about the jungle hero. There are 36 episodes produced over four seasons.

== Opening-credits narration ==
"The jungle: Here I was born: and here my parents died when I was but an infant. I would have soon perished, too, had I not been found by a kindly she-ape named Kala, who adopted me as her own and taught me the ways of the wild. I learned quickly, and grew stronger each day, and now I share the friendship and trust of all jungle animals. The jungle is filled with beauty, and danger: and lost cities filled with good, and evil. This is my domain, and I protect those who come here: for I am Tarzan, Lord of the Jungle!"

== Storyline ==
In many ways, the series is the most faithful of all screen-based adaptations of Edgar Rice Burroughs's Tarzan and featured a number of "lost cities" from the original novels. The rotoscoped animation is based upon the work of Burrough's favorite Tarzan artist, Burne Hogarth.

In the series, Tarzan is depicted as intelligent and well-spoken – not the simple-minded ("Tarzan... Jane") caricature of many films. His sidekick is N'kima the monkey, as in the novels ("Cheeta" the chimpanzee was the creation of movie producers). It uses much of Burroughs' Mangani language (though some of the words used, particularly for animals not encountered in the novels, do not appear in Burroughs' Mangani lexicons, and so were presumably newly invented for the show).

== Characters ==
=== Main characters ===
Tarzan and N'kima

- Tarzan (voiced by Robert Ridgely when speaking, Danton Burroughs for Tarzan yell) – The main protagonist.
- N'kima (vocal effects provided by an uncredited Lou Scheimer) – Tarzan's manu (monkey) companion.
- Jad-bal-ja – A golden-furred, dark-maned lion raised and trained by Tarzan.
- Tantor – African forest elephants that are friendly towards Tarzan and will also come to his aid if summoned.

=== Other characters ===
- Queen Nemone (voiced by Joan Gerber in the first appearance, Hettie Lynn Hurtes in the third appearance) – The ruler of Zandor who has had encounters with Tarzan.
  - Tomos (voiced by Alan Oppenheimer) – Queen Nemone's prime minister who does her bidding.
  - Belthar – Queen Nemone's pet lion.
- Phobeg (voiced by Ted Cassidy in the first appearance, Alan Oppenheimer in the third appearance) – The strongest man in Zandor and member of Zandor's Royal Guards. In Phobeg's first appearance, Tarzan must fight him in a tournament. Tarzan managed to defeat him and Phobeg later frees him and Thia. Phobeg has since remained a secret ally of Tarzan when it comes to Queen Nemone's plots. In "Tarzan and the Soul Stealer", it is shown that Phobeg has a son named Tiborgh who assists his father in working in Zandor's Royal Guards.
- Jane Porter (voiced by Linda Gary) – Tarzan's love interest in the original novels, she only appeared once during the Filmation series. In "Tarzan and Jane", she and her father were part of an archaeological expedition looking for the lost city of Cowloon and were accompanied back to civilization by Tarzan.

=== Fictional races ===
- Mangani – A type of great ape. They are intelligent, with their own spoken language (which Tarzan knows), are Tarzan's friends and family, and will come to his aid if summoned. Named Mangani include Terkoz (voiced by Lou Scheimer) and Tor. Kala was only seen in the intro of this cartoon.
- Bolmangani – A race of gorilla-men. They take monkeys, normal gorillas, and other animals to be used as slaves in plots to enhance their city and to take over the entire jungle. The Bolmangani have fought Tarzan many times and have been thwarted by him. They try to get revenge on him for thwarting their plots.
- Donlumangani – A race of short humanoid primates that live in the snowy mountains. They are nicknamed the Ice People.
- Monkey People – A race of creatures that are part human, part monkey.

=== Other animals ===
Almost all of the animals in the Filmation series are referred to using the Mangani-language names that Tarzan knows them by.

- Argus – A giant eagle
- Bazansi – A spider
- Bolgani – A gorilla
- Borta – A common warthog
- Buto – A black rhinoceros
- Dimetrodon – A reptile from the inner world of Pellucidar and the land of Pal-ul-don
- Dango – A spotted hyena
- Duro – A hippopotamus
- Eta-pamba - A kangaroo rat
- Gimla – A crocodile
- Gordo – An aquatic beast resembling a sauropod
- Gorgos – An African buffalo
- Gryf – A dinosaur-like creature in Pal-ul-don that is described by Tarzan as "ancient". It resembles a Triceratops with the dorsal plates and spiked tail of a Stegosaurus and teeth like an Allosaurus.
- Handal – A hornet
- Histah – A Central African rock python
- Lukota – A giant tortoise
- Manu – A monkey. N'kima is one.
- Nita – A hawk
- Numa – A lion
- Pacco - A zebra
- Plesa – A fish
- Sabor – A lioness who is an old enemy of Tarzan
- Sheeta – A leopard
- Tandor - The Pellucidar name for the woolly mammoths.
- Tangani – A baboon
- Tarbogani – A white gorilla
- Tar-Sheeta – A large white tiger that lives in the snowy mountains
- Thipdar - The Pellucidar name for the Pteranodon
- Zabor - The Pellucidar name for the Tyrannosaurus
- Zupisa – A great whale

== Episode list ==
There were 36 total episodes, produced over four seasons.

The first season (premiered September 11, 1976) consisted of 16 half-hour episodes. The second season (premiered September 10, 1977) added six new episodes, and aired with the half-hour series The New Adventures of Batman as The Batman/Tarzan Adventure Hour. The third season (premiered September 9, 1978) added six new episodes, and aired with a number of other series as the ninety-minute Tarzan and the Super 7. The fourth season (premiered September 15, 1979) added eight new episodes, and aired as part of the second season of Tarzan and the Super 7.

The "fifth season" (The Tarzan/Lone Ranger Adventure Hour), and the "sixth season" (The Tarzan/Lone Ranger/Zorro Adventure Hour) were all Tarzan reruns aired with other series.

=== Season 1: 1976 ===
No. overall	No. in season	Title	Original release date
1	1	"Tarzan and the City of Gold"	September 11, 1976
Upon saving a woman named Thia from the Bulgani gorilla tribe, Tarzan learns that she is from Athne the City of Ivory and had been chased away by enemy soldiers from Zandor the City of Gold. While helping Thia back to Athne, Tarzan ends up captured by the Zandorians. While imprisoned, Tarzan meets his cellmate Phobeg who tells him of Queen Nemone who has the two of them fight in the arena. Once Phobeg is freed, Tarzan ends up incarcerated with Thia after harming her prime minister Tomos. However, Phobeg has a plan to free Tarzan and Thia.
2	2	"Tarzan and the Vikings"	September 18, 1976
A race of jungle vikings (who are descendants of the vikings that were blown to Africa by a north wind sent by Odin 1,000 years ago) capture Tarzan to be the slave to Corina, the daughter of the Viking Chieftain Erik. Tarzan learns from Corina how the Vikings came to Africa, and discovers that she is in love with the lawman Sven's son Bjorn, though her father, Erik, objects to their relationship. During that time, Tarzan uncovers a plot by the viking Torvald to overthrow Corina's father.
3	3	"Tarzan and the Golden Lion"	September 25, 1976
Tarzan comes to the aid of Ando, Coney, and the rest of the Monkey People when the Bolmangani are enslaving them. When Tarzan ends up in danger, Jad-bal-ja rallies the elephants to help Tarzan free the captives and teach the Monkey People to stand up to the Bolmangani and their Emperor.
4	4	"Tarzan and the Forbidden City"	October 2, 1976
Tarzan's old friend Paul Gregory and his daughter return to the jungle. Paul tells Tarzan that he is here looking for his son Brian who disappeared upon finding the Forbidden City of Ushare located in the extinct volcano Tuen Baka. The next day, Tarzan finds out that three men named Magara, Castelle, and Chabalt (whom Paul encountered at the hotel) are also seeking the map to Ushare in order to steal the father of diamonds. When both groups are captured by the soldiers of Ushare, it is up to Tarzan to free them.
5	5	"Tarzan and the Graveyard of the Elephants"	October 9, 1976
Upon discovering elephant skeletons without their tusks, Tarzan discovers that soldiers led by King Aga of Novard is behind this and his armies are looking for the Graveyard of the Elephants. Tarzan discovers that the Novardians worship the woolly mammoth Bentor (whom they consider a god) and want Tarzan to take them to the Graveyard of the Elephants in order to harvest the tusks there.
6	6	"Tarzan's Return to the City of Gold"	October 16, 1976
Upon saving a runaway boy named Orando from Buto, Tarzan learns that he is the younger brother of Thia from Athne and plans to return him to Athne. Meanwhile, Queen Nemone orders Tomos to lead her soldiers into recapturing Tarzan. Tomos plans to use Orando as bait in order to recapture Tarzan causing Tarzan to enlist Phobeg's help.
7	7	"Tarzan and the Strange Visitors"	October 23, 1976
Tarzan has an encounter with an anthropologist named Jill Bennington at the same time when aliens led by Dr. Krolar arrive in their UFO to capture animal specimens to bring to their world.
8	8	"Tarzan and the Land of the Giants"	October 30, 1976
During a drought, Tarzan finds large footprints and follows them into a hidden valley which contains large trees and vegetation. Tarzan comes to the aid of a giant named Yuri when his father Muro has been imprisoned by the tyrant King Odysseus and that the giants live in fear of Buto (who has been said to be a god in the form of a white rhinoceros). To make matters worse, a dangerous storm is heading to the giants' village of Zoram.
9	9	"Tarzan and the Knights of Nimmr"	November 6, 1976
Upon finding a crashed balloon, Tarzan searches for its pilot which leads him to the Valley of Nimmr where he encounters knights that end up taking him to Queen Grenalda. He soon encounters the balloonist Annie Talbot who is a writer. When the queen falls ill and Sir Mallad has Tarzan imprisoned in the dungeon, Tarzan learns from the Queen's Royal Physician Sir Ronald that Sir Mallad plans to steal the throne from Queen Grenalda.
10	10	"Tarzan's Rival"	November 13, 1976
Mr. Senti and his scientist creates a robot duplicate of Tarzan in order to blame the real one for the animal mistreatment so that they can steal the Jewels of Opa. Before long, the jungle animals become mistrustful of Tarzan and attack him on sight. Even N'kima and Jad-bal-jah are unable to tell the difference. Tarzan must now expose the robot Tarzan and thwart the plots of Mr. Senti.
11	11	"Tarzan and the City of Sorcery"	November 20, 1976
While riding on Tantor, Tarzan saves a boy named Tuck (who mistakes Tarzan as the god Aliat since he resembles him) from Numa. He learns from Tuck that the sorceress Queen Nubia has turned Tuck's father into a baboon causing Tarzan to go to the city of Rashid to confront Queen Nubia. Tarzan later learns that her magic is not as she claims it to be which Tarzan plans to expose.
12	12	"Tarzan at the Earth's Core"	November 27, 1976
Tarzan and N'kima follows a boy named Kimo of Nolangi into a crater that leads him to the Land of Darkness with a plan to unite both tribes upon speaking to King Mavor. With help from King Mavor's daughter Nina, Tarzan plans to help Kimo make peace between both tribes while evading the dangers of the prehistoric land of Pellucidar (consisting of prehistoric animals such as dinosaurs and other prehistoric mammals) in order to get King Ovan of Nolangi and King Mavor to understand the peace between the tribes.
13	13	"Tarzan and the Ice Creature"	December 4, 1976
While working on his garden with N'kima and Tantor, Tarzan sees the mountain of ice about to erupt and has the animals get to safety. The eruption ends up freeing the gigantic Yeti-like ice creature Glakor from the volcano as it soon ends up being targeted by the poacher Norcross and his assistant Phelps.
14	14	"Tarzan and the Olympiads"	December 11, 1976
Upon investigating a strange disturbance in the jungle, Tarzan rescues two slaves named Dimitri and Logos from Grecian soldiers who come from the city of Olympus. Tarzan learns that the slaves were former tournament champions who were defeated by younger challengers and made slaves by Emperor Cronus. Now Tarzan must go up in three challenges in order to free the slaves and make Emperor Cronus see the error of his ways.
15	15	"Tarzan's Trial"	December 18, 1976
The UFO that was previously used by Dr. Krolar returns to the jungle where the robots end up capturing Tarzan. He is brought before Commander Dumay who states that Dr. Krolar and Leera aren't on the mission with him. Commander Dumay plans to use his computer to scan Tarzan's memory in order to learn all of Tarzan's abilities and transfer them to him in order to become supreme ruler of the space fleet.
16	16	"Tarzan, the Hated"	December 18, 1976
The Bolmangani Emperor returns and plans revenge on Tarzan by turning a tribe of gorillas against Tarzan. The Bolmangani then go to great lengths by having the gorilla tribe abduct a female archaeologist named Lois as bait so that the Bolmangani can rebuild their city in the Opar Region much to the objections of Lois who claims that the ground there is unsafe.

=== Season 2: 1977 ===
Aired as part of The Batman/Tarzan Adventure Hour.

No. overall	No. in season	Title	Original release date
17	1	"Tarzan and the Sunken City of Atlantis"	September 10, 1977
Upon saving Zupisa the great whale who had been beached, Tarzan discovers that Lord Cinnabar of Atlantis had enslaved the whales and uses them to power it while King Neptune is away. After leading a successful rebellion against the whales' slavery, Tarzan learns that Atlantis will flood unless power is restored and seeks help from Princess Aquila to find another way to power Atlantis.
18	2	"Tarzan and the Bird People"	September 17, 1977
While hiding out in a cave during a thunderstorm, Tarzan and N'kima come to the aid of Layir of the Bird People who had injured his wing upon going down in the thunderstorm. Tarzan soon learns that the Bird People have been in a feud with the local "Land People". Upon learning about what the Bird People have been doing to the Land People from their chief Tarin, Tarzan visits the Bird People's ruler King Aviaro who considers the Land People to be primitive. Now Tarzan must find a way to unite both tribes whatever way possible.
19	3	"Tarzan and the Colossus of Zome"	September 24, 1977
After saving an inches-high woman named Reba from the clutches of a hawk, Tarzan learns that she comes from Onada which is located on the Isle of Zires. He uses Argus the giant bird of prey to get the both of them over the mountains to take her home. They return Reba back to the Isle of Zires, but the army of Reba's father Governor Dumas captures Tarzan. Dumas intends to compel the giant to fight in their war against Zome, an enemy city of other tiny people. The Zomans, led by their governor and his scientist Orbin, entered the war following a disagreement years ago and they intend to end it with their giant robot called the Colossus. Unfortunately, the Colossus, programmed to value the rule of the strongest, turns against the Zomans. Now Tarzan must find a way to defeat the Colossus and bring peace to both sides. (This episode took some inspiration from the original 1924 Edgar Rice Burroughs novel Tarzan and the Ant Men.)
20	4	"Tarzan and the Beast in the Iron Mask"	October 1, 1977
Tarzan and N'kima prepare for a celebration held by the Wazdon Chief Denat in the lost land of Pal-ul-don (which was from the book Tarzan the Terrible). Upon arrival, he sees that Denat isn't himself and flees the guards. When he infiltrates the tower, he finds a man in an iron mask who is the real Denat and that his evil brother Tanat has assumed his identity and has been having the tribesmen mine for gold in a volcano. Now Tarzan must find the key to the mask which is guarded by a Dimetrodon, free Denat, and help Denat expose Tanat's plot with some unlikely help from the Gryf.
21	5	"Tarzan and the Amazon Princess"	October 8, 1977
Tarzan meets a feral woman named Dorrae who can also communicate with animals like Tarzan does and lives in the jungles with the lions Ola and Utu who have raised her since her childhood. Tarzan discovers that the locket around her neck belongs to the royalty of the Amazons causing Tarzan to take Dorrae to the Amazons to look into this. Once Tarzan has gotten Dorrae back to her mother Queen Arcad, he is unaware that the Captain of the Royal Guard Rowanda had orchestrated Dorrae's extermination years ago so that she can become the heir to the throne. To make matters worse, the water monster Gordo continuously attacks the tribe to find the egg that went missing from her nest.
22	6	"Tarzan and the Conquistadors"	October 15, 1977
Tarzan and N'kima find a group of Conquistadors in the jungle where their leader Carlos claims that the treasure of his ancestors are in the mountains where the Donlumangani live. Now Tarzan must enlist the help of Tar-Sheeta to help the Donlumangani prevent the Conquistadors from stealing back their treasure before a cave-in is caused on the Donlumangani's city.

=== Season 3: 1978 ===
Aired as part of Tarzan and the Super 7, season one.

No. overall	No. in season	Title	Original release date
23	1	"Tarzan and the Spider People"	September 9, 1978
After stopping a stampede of elephants, Tarzan learns from Tantor that their stampede was caused by the appearance of giant spiders who have been abducting some of the elephants. When he follows the giant spiders to their city at the top of two large trees, he discovers that the giant spiders are actually machines piloted by the city's inhabitants who are sorted into workers and scholars when he meets a female worker named Ara. Upon being brought to the lead scholar Ziller and told about his kind abducting elephants, Tarzan and Ziller are then told by the worker leader Rachnid that he and the other workers plan to use the elephants for their labor in order to make the workers' rooms the same as the scholars' room.
24	2	"Tarzan and the Space God"	September 16, 1978
Tarzan saves a man named Professor Robert Ragsdale when his plane crashes into a river during a thunderstorm. Tarzan learns from Professor Ragsdale that a watery area in the shape of the Mayan God Kukulkan is suspected to be where the Mayans disappeared to enabling Tarzan to have Jad-bal-ja lead them to the lost city where the lost Chichen Itza tribe lives. They find some robots working for the Mayans who worship a high priest who claims to be Kukulkan when in fact that he is actually an alien from another planet.
25	3	"Tarzan and the Lost World"	September 23, 1978
Tarzan meets Dr. Jessica Randolph who needs his help to look for an orbital satellite that went down in the jungle several days ago. Their search brings them to a crater concealed by magnetic energies which consists of mythological creatures. They learn from a Faun named Puck that the Minotaur has the satellite and that they must get the orbital satellite (which resembles the Minotaur) out of the valley before it explodes.
26	4	"Tarzan and the Monkey God"	September 30, 1978
While evading Tangani, N'Kima stumbles upon a village where the Mohani mistake him for the monkey god Komanu. When Tarzan arrives, he helps N'Kima and the Mohani deal with the white gorilla Tarbogani who has been raiding the village for food upon being wounded and separated from his gorilla tribe.
27	5	"Tarzan and the Haunted Forest"	October 7, 1978
Tarzan runs into some loggers cutting down some trees in order to get the wood for their city so that they can feed the machines that do the work. Tarzan learns that they cut down the trees in their land except for a haunted forest. Upon being brought before Queen Tara, Tarzan resists her offer to give up his area upon being told of Queen Tara's plot by her twin sister Mara. Tarzan and Mara flee into the haunted forest where it was actually "haunted" by those who are against Queen Tara's deforestation plots. Now Tarzan must help these people into making Queen Tara see the error of cutting down the local trees even when a monsoon comes.
28	6	"Tarzan and the Island of Dr. Morphos"	October 14, 1978
Tarzan witnesses a Mangani with the wings of a bird make off with N'kima. He follows the Mangani/Bird hybrid to an island in the jungle where he encounters hybrid animals and is soon brought to the scientist Dr. Morphos who created the hybrid animals. He now plans to do his genetic experiments on Tarzan until Tarzan evades him and ends up meeting failed experiments led by Doro that used to be monkeys who help him thwart Dr. Morphos' plot.

=== Season 4: 1979 ===
Aired as part of Tarzan and the Super 7, season two.

No. overall	No. in season	Title	Original release date
29	1	"Tarzan and the Sifu"	September 15, 1979
During a hot day, Tarzan meets Chang who is the nephew of the Sifu of Tao Ching. Upon arrival in Tao Ching, Tarzan and Chang are taken prisoner by the guards led by Wu Han who has overthrown the Sifu. Wu Han plans to lead Tao Ching's armies in a plot to conquer the other cities in the jungle as well as use the Dragon Pearl to control the Dragon of Tao Ching.
30	2	"Tarzan and Jane"	September 22, 1979
After dealing with a gorilla named Terkoz, Tarzan meets Jane Porter and her father Professor Archimedes Q. Porter after falling victim to a mutiny during an archaeological expedition to the lost city of Cowloon. As Tarzan helps them to get back to civilization, he also ends up coming to the aid of Cowloon when their guardian beast has broken free.
31	3	"Tarzan and the Land Beneath the Earth"	September 29, 1979
Tarzan, N'kima, Tantor, Buto, and Gorgos end up sucked underground by a forcefield and end up in the underground city of Terrapolis which is inhabited by the mole people. Tarzan learns from Dr. Zolus that they have been using the Makos Trees in order to power their furnace when their own thermal vegetation has been exhausted. With help from the mole scientist Sedora, Tarzan must free his animal friends, prevent more Makos Trees from being brought to Terrapolis, and find a new source of power for the mole people to use.
32	4	"Tarzan and the Drought"	October 6, 1979
During a drought, Tarzan learns from Coney that Ando and the Monkey People are building a dam in the river in order to save their water supplies. The lack of water ends up driving the animals of the jungle in a frenzied state. Tarzan tries to get Ando to tear down the dam until it comes to a rainstorm that causes the dam to overflow.
33	5	"Tarzan and the Soul Stealer"	October 13, 1979
Tarzan meets up with Thia again upon saving her from Dango the Hyena. This time, Zandor and Athne are at war once again. Upon arrival and capture, Tarzan learns from Phobeg's son Tiborgh that Queen Nemone had dove deep into the forbidden mystic arts and became a sorceress where one of her magic tricks has turned Phobeg into a lion. Tarzan suspects that Queen Nemone's magic isn't as she claims it to be since Tarzan had previously dealt with something like this before (as seen in "Tarzan and the City of Sorcery").
34	6	"Tarzan and the Future King"	October 20, 1979
Tarzan meets with King Torg of the Red Gorilla Kingdom where Prince Yaru is to inherit the throne of the Red Gorilla Kingdom. Prince Yaru's final test is to return with a branch from the olive tree on Mount Mammoth with no help whatsoever. Yet King Torg's Vizier has other plans which involves seeing that Prince Yaru fails and that the Vizier will get the throne.
35	7	"Tarzan and the Huntress"	October 27, 1979
After saving a gorilla and her son from the Bolmangani, Tarzan ends up having an encounter with Fana the Huntress and her pet white tiger Pasha. Fana ends up targeting Jad-bal-ja. During Fana's hunt, the Bolmangani Commander Kerlock and his men mistake her as an ally of Tarzan and capture her and Pasha causing Tarzan to come to her rescue.
36	8	"Tarzan and the White Elephant"	November 3, 1979
Tarzan saves a young girl from Rhino Riders only to find that she is looking to capture an infant White Elephant and takes it from its mother. The girl is the child of the queen who believes that White Elephants protect her city of Nibia from the Rhino Riders. Tarzan takes exception and tries to dissuade the Queen from separating the calf from its mother, but she will not listen. Taking pity on the White Elephant calf, the girl helps the White Elephant calf escape to reunite it with its mother....only to be chased by the Rhino Riders. But the mother White Elephant with the help of Tarzan rescues her. It was at this point that the Queen realizes no one should separate a mother from her child.

== Cast ==
- Robert Ridgely – Tarzan, Tarzan Robot (in "Tarzan's Rival") King Ovan (in "Tarzan at the Earth's Core"), Robot (in "Tarzan's Trial")
- Lou Scheimer - N'kima (uncredited), Mangani (uncredited), Zandor Guard (in "Tarzan and the City of Gold", "Tarzan's Return to the City of Gold"; uncredited), Bolmangani Guard (in "Tarzan and the Golden Lion"; uncredited), Ungo (in "Tarzan and the Forbidden City"; uncredited), Forbidden City King (in "Tarzan and the Forbidden City"; uncredited), Novard Guard (in "Tarzan and the Graveyard of the Elephants"; uncredited), Gajat the Great Mangani (in "Tarzan's Return to the City of Gold"; uncredited), Robot Guard (in "Tarzan and the Strange Visitors"; uncredited), Giant Warrior (in "Tarzan and the Land of Giants"; uncredited), Gimla (in "Tarzan and the City of Sorcery"; uncredited), Rashid Guard (in "Tarzan and the City of Sorcery"; uncredited), Prisoner (in "Tarzan and the City of Sorcery"; uncredited), Glakor (in "Tarzan and the Ice Creature"; uncredited), Bolmangani (in "Tarzan the Hated"; uncredited), Land Person (in "Tarzan and the Bird People"; uncredited), Rachnid (in "Tarzan and the Spider People"; uncredited), Worker (in "Tarzan and the Haunted Forest"; uncredited), Tao Ching Guard (in "Tarzan and the Sifu"; uncredited), Archimedes Q. Porter (in "Tarzan and Jane"; uncredited), Terkoz (in "Tarzan and Jane"; uncredited), Mutineer (in "Tarzan and Jane"; uncredited), Cowloon Descendant (in "Tarzan and Jane"; uncredited), Ando (in "Tarzan and the Drought"; uncredited), Monkey Person (in "Tarzan and the Drought"; uncredited), Zandor Soldier (in "Tarzan and the Soul Stealer"; uncredited), Prisoner (in "Tarzan and the Soul Stealer"; uncredited), Red Gorilla Soldier (in "Tarzan and the Future King") Phibian (in "Tarzan and the White Elephant"; uncredited), Nibian Guard (in "Tarzan and the White Elephant"; uncredited)
- Jack Bannon – Brant (in "Tarzan and the Olympiads")
- Erika Carroll – Nina (in "Tarzan at the Earth's Core"), Carna (in "Tarzan and the Space God")
- Ted Cassidy – Phobeg (in "Tarzan and the City of Gold", "Tarzan's Return to the City of Gold")
- Robert Chapel –
- Gerald Clark –
- Linda Gary – Annie Talbot (in "Tarzan and the Knights of Nimmr"), Reba (in "Tarzan and the Colossus of Zome"), Rowanda (in "Tarzan and the Amazon Princess"), Dr. Jessica Randolph (in "Tarzan and the Lost World"), Queen Tara (in "Tarzan and the Haunted Forest"), Mara (in "Tarzan and the Haunted Forest"), Jane Porter (in "Tarzan and Jane"), Zidora (in "Tarzan and the Land Beneath the Earth"), Landa (in "Tarzan and the Future King"), Red Gorilla Kingdom Queen (in "Tarzan and the Future King"), Fana the Huntress (in "Tarzan and the Huntress"), Angora (in "Tarzan and the White Elephant"), Queen Tiara (in "Tarzan and the White Elephant")
- Joanie Gerber – Queen Nemone (in "Tarzan and the City of Gold", "Tarzan's Return to the City of Gold")
- Barry Gordon – Bjorn (in "Tarzan and the Vikings")
- Hettie Lynn Hurtes – Thia (in "Tarzan and the City of Gold", "Tarzan and the Soul Stealer"), Queen Nemone (in "Tarzan and the Soul Stealer")
- Howard Morris - Mr. Zanti (in "Tarzan's Rival"; uncredited), Professor (in "Tarzan's Rival"; uncredited)
- Alan Oppenheimer – Tomos (in "Tarzan and the City of Gold", "Tarzan's Return to the City of Gold", "Tarzan and the Soul Stealer"), Bolmangani Guard (in "Tarzan and the Golden Lion", "Tarzan's Trial"), Monkey People Tribesman (in "Tarzan and the Golden Lion"), Paul Gregory (in "Tarzan and the Forbidden City"), Magrat (in "Tarzan and the Forbidden City), Shabot (in "Tarzan and the Forbidden City"), Norcross (in "Tarzan and the Ice Creature"), Phelps (in "Tarzan and the Ice Creature"), Smiley (in "Tarzan and the Ice Creature"), Emperor Cronus (in "Tarzan and the Olympiads"), Malanor (in "Tarzan and the Olympiads"), Alien Doctor (in "Tarzan's Trial"), Orbin (in "Tarzan and the Colossus of Zome"), Carlos (in "Tarzan and the Conquistadors"), Jorak (in "Tarzan and the Conquistadors"), Targani (in "Tarzan and the Monkey God"), Tarbogani (in "Tarzan and the Monkey God"), Zan (in "Tarzan and the Monkey God"), Phobeg (in "Tarzan and the Soul Stealer"), Zandor Soldier (in "Tarzan and the Soul Stealer"), Commander Girak (in "Tarzan and the Huntress") Bolmangani Emperor (in "Tarzan and the Huntress")
- Jay Scheimer - Native Woman (in "Tarzan and the Beast in the Iron Mask"), Meridia (in "Tarzan and the Space God"; uncredited), Monkey Person (in "Tarzan and the Drought"; uncredited)
- Jane Webb –
- Frank Welker - Chang (in "Tarzan and the Sifu"; uncredited), Sifu (in "Tarzan and the Sifu"; uncredited), Wu Han (in "Tarzan and the Sifu"; uncredited), Dr. Zolus (in "Tarzan and the Land Beneath the Earth"; uncredited), Mole People (in "Tarzan and the Land Beneath the Earth"; uncredited), Prince Yaru (in "Tarzan and the Future King"; uncredited), King Togg (in "Tarzan and the Future King"; uncredited), Vizier (in "Tarzan and the Future King"; uncredited)

== Formats ==
- Tarzan, Lord of the Jungle (September 11, 1976 – September 3, 1977, CBS)
- The Batman/Tarzan Adventure Hour (September 10, 1977 – September 2, 1978, CBS)
- Tarzan and the Super 7 (September 9, 1978 – September 6, 1980, CBS)
- The Tarzan/Lone Ranger Adventure Hour (September 13, 1980 – September 5, 1981, CBS)
- The Tarzan/Lone Ranger/Zorro Adventure Hour (September 12, 1981 – September 11, 1982, CBS)

== Home media ==
The series is not owned by Universal Television, and the rights are owned by the Edgar Rice Burroughs company. Warner Home Video has released one episode on DVD, "Tarzan and the Colossus of Zome", on Saturday Morning Cartoons: 1970s Volume 1; Warner Bros.' rights to the series may originate from their ownership of international TV distribution rights in the 1970s and 1980s. Ironically, Warner has released most of the Tarzan franchise it owns either through its Turner Broadcasting subsidiary or in-house.

The first season of the series was released on DVD on June 14, 2016 as part of its 40th anniversary.

Preceded by Tarzan (NBC); 1966–1968	Tarzan; Tarzan, Lord of the Jungle; 1976–1980	Succeeded by Tarzan in Manhattan; April 15, 1989
