= The New Adventures of the Lone Ranger (1980 TV series) =

- Genre: Animated series
- Voices of: William Conrad; Ivan Naranjo
- Country of origin: United States
- Original language: English
- No. of seasons: 2
- No. of episodes: 28

Production
- Producers: Lou Scheimer; Norm Prescott
- Production company: Filmation

Original release
- Network: CBS
- Release: September 13, 1980 – January 30, 1982

The New Adventures of the Lone Ranger is an American animated television series produced by Filmation in 1980. The series ran for 28 episodes over two seasons on CBS as part of The Tarzan/Lone Ranger/Zorro Adventure Hour.

Unlike the 1966 Lone Ranger cartoon, which strayed into science-fiction and comic book plots, the 1980 version stuck to more standard Western fare. The plots included real figures from American history, including President Ulysses S. Grant and Nellie Bly. Filmation originally tried to cast Clayton Moore and Jay Silverheels, reprising their roles from the live-action series, but could not afford the extra day of rehearsal per episode the actors required. William Conrad performed the opening narration over the classic William Tell Overture, with a slight change to the description of Tonto as "fearless Indian friend" vs the original "faithful Indian companion" of the old series. Moreover, for the new series, Tonto spoke whole sentences, in contrast to his more-limited vocabulary from the live-action show.

== Episode list ==
=== Season 1 (1980–81) ===
No. overall	No. in season	Title	Original release date
1	1	"Hanga, the Night Monster"	September 13, 1980
2	2	"The Yellowstone Conspiracy"	September 20, 1980
3	3	"The Escape"	September 27, 1980
4	4	"The Great Balloon Race"	October 4, 1980
5	5	"The President Plot"	October 18, 1980
6	6	"Tall Timber"	October 25, 1980
7	7	"Blowout"	November 1, 1980
8	8	"The Abduction of Tom Sawyer"	November 8, 1980
9	9	"The Silver Mine"	November 15, 1980
10	10	"The Valley of Gold"	November 22, 1980
11	11	"The Wildest Wild West Show"	November 29, 1980
12	12	"The Black Mare"	December 6, 1980
13	13	"The Renegade"	December 20, 1980
14	14	"The Great Land Rush"	January 10, 1981
15	15	"The Memory Trap"	January 17, 1981
16	16	"The Runaway"	January 24, 1981

=== Season 2 (1981–82) ===
No. overall	No. in season	Title	Original release date
17	1	"Photo Finish"	September 19, 1981
18	2	"Walk a Tight Wire"	September 26, 1981
19	3	"High and Dry"	October 3, 1981
20	4	"The Ghost Wagons"	October 10, 1981
21	5	"The Great Train Treachery"	October 31, 1981
22	6	"Blast-Out"	November 7, 1981
23	7	"Renegade Roundup"	November 21, 1981
24	8	"Front Page Cover-Up"	January 2, 1982
25	9	"Unnatural Disaster"	January 9, 1982
26	10	"Showdown on the Midnight Queen"	January 16, 1982
27	11	"Banning's Raiders"	January 23, 1982
28	12	"The Long Drive"	January 30, 1982

== Cast ==
- William Conrad (credited as "J. Darnoc") – The Lone Ranger
- Ivan Naranjo – Tonto
- Alan Oppenheimer - Various Characters
- Erika Scheimer – Various Characters
- Jay Scheimer – Various Characters
- Lou Scheimer – Various Characters
- Frank Welker – Various Characters

During the 1982–83 season, The Lone Ranger series continued on CBS on Sunday Morning as part of the mini-CBS Lineup Lone Ranger/Zorro, which ran for 30 minutes in short, cut versions, starting with showing Zorro, then The Lone Ranger.
