= Tarzan and the Super 7 =

- Written by: Len Janson; Chuck Menville
- Voices of: Robert Ridgely; Adam West; Burt Ward; Melendy Britt; Lou Scheimer; Lennie Weinrib; Linda Gary; Ty Henderson; Kim Hamilton; Diane Pershing; Michael Bell; Bob Denison; Howard Morris; Alan Oppenheimer
- Country of origin: United States
- Original language: English
- No. of seasons: 1
- No. of episodes: 33

Production
- Executive producers: Lou Scheimer; Norm Prescott
- Producer: Don Christensen
- Running time: 90 minutes (1978–1979); 60 minutes (1979–1980)
- Production company: Filmation Associates

Original release
- Network: CBS
- Release: September 9, 1978 – September 6, 1980

Related
- Batman/Tarzan Adventure Hour; Batman and the Super 7; The Tarzan/Lone Ranger Adventure Hour

Tarzan and the Super 7 is a Saturday morning cartoon series, produced by Filmation and originally airing from 1978–1980 on CBS.

The show consisted of separate installments featuring seven groups of adventurers:

- Tarzan, Lord of the Jungle
- The New Adventures of Batman
- The Freedom Force — Isis, Super-Samurai, Sinbad, Merlin, and Hercules
- Jason of Star Command — the only live-action segment
- Manta and Moray
- Superstretch and Microwoman
- Web Woman

The show was an updating of The Batman/Tarzan Adventure Hour which aired on CBS Saturday mornings during the 1977–1978 television season. That series featured separate half-hour episodes for each hero, with each show having its own opening and closing credits. The two series had previously run separately as Tarzan, Lord of the Jungle (1976) and The New Adventures of Batman (1977).

== Batman and the Super 7 ==
During the 1980–1981 television season, NBC ran repeat episodes under the title Batman and the Super 7. The Dynamic Duo's lone crusade on NBC Saturday Morning, this hourlong series featured all of the original 'Super 7' segments except Jason of Star Command and Tarzan, Lord of the Jungle (the Tarzan show continued airing repeats on CBS as part of The Tarzan/Lone Ranger Adventure Hour (1980–1981), later renamed The Tarzan/Lone Ranger/Zorro Adventure Hour (1981–1982)). The entire half-hour episodes of The New Adventures of Batman were heavily condensed into weekly 10-minute two-parters.

== Home media ==
To date, the only segment released in North America is the five episodes produced of The Freedom Force as well as the live-action series, Jason of Star Command. Warner Home Video released the Batman series in June 2007.

- Space Sentinels & Freedom Force — The Complete Series - August 22, 2006
- Jason of Star Command — The Complete Series DVD Set - May 8, 2007
- The New Adventures of Batman — The Complete Series DVD Set - June 26, 2007

DC Comics sued Filmation in 1978 over Superstretch and MicroWoman and Manta and Moray being trademark infringements of Plastic Man and Aquaman respectively, winning both a 1980 decision and a 1986 appeal.
