= The New Adventures of Batman =

American animated television series

- Title card
- Based on: Batman by: Bob Kane; Bill Finger
- Directed by: Don Towsley
- Voices of: Adam West; Burt Ward; Lennie Weinrib; Melendy Britt
- Country of origin: United States
- Original language: English
- No. of seasons: 1
- No. of episodes: 16

Production
- Executive producers: Norm Prescott; Lou Scheimer
- Producer: Don Christensen
- Running time: 25 minutes
- Production companies: Filmation; DC Comics

Original release
- Network: CBS
- Release: February 12 – May 28, 1977

Related
- Batman; The Adventures of Batman

The New Adventures of Batman is an American animated superhero television series that aired on CBS from February 12 to May 28, 1977, featuring the DC Comics superheroes Batman, Robin, and Batgirl. The series was a Filmation and DC Comics production.

== Plot ==
In The New Adventures of Batman, the "Dynamic Duo" fights crime in Gotham City, encountering the classic Batman rogues gallery as well as some original villains. Complicating matters is Bat-Mite, a well-meaning imp from another dimension called Ergo, who considers himself Batman's biggest fan. As a result, he wears a variant of Batman's costume and attempts to help him, only to often create more problems. Alfred Pennyworth is missing in the series. Also notable in this series are the inverted colors of the circled "R" on Robin's costume.

== Voice cast ==
- Adam West as Batman / Bruce Wayne
- Burt Ward as Robin / Dick Grayson
- Melendy Britt as Batgirl / Barbara Gordon, Catwoman
- Lou Scheimer as Bat-Mite, Batcomputer, Clayface / Matt Hagen, Lucky's Henchman (in "The Chameleon")
- Lennie Weinrib as Commissioner Gordon, Joker, Penguin / Oswald Cobblepot, Mr. Freeze (in "The Deep Freeze"), Sweet Tooth (in "A Sweet Joke On Gotham City"), Electro (in "Bite-Sized"), Chameleon (in "The Chameleon"), Dr. Devious (in "The Chameleon"), Zarbor, Moonman / Scott Rogers (in "The Moonman"), Professor Bubbles (in "The Bermuda Rectangle"), Flow (in "The Bermuda Rectangle"), Lucky Luger (in "The Chameleon"), Professor Frost (in "The Deep Freeze"), Boyd Baxter (in "Curses! Oiled Again!")

== Production ==
=== Development ===
In September 1968, before The New Adventures of Batman, Filmation had created and aired an animated series named The Batman/Superman Hour for CBS. This series, the first Saturday morning cartoon series for Batman, paired up newly made Batman and Robin adventures with Superman and Superboy segments from the existing series The New Adventures of Superman. In 1969, it was repackaged into 30-minute episodes without the Superman segments and renamed Batman with Robin the Boy Wonder.

The New Adventures of Batman was produced concurrently with Super Friends, which was produced by the competing Hanna-Barbera Productions and included Batman and Robin as members, marking a rare occurrence in animation history which saw two studios simultaneously producing series featuring the same characters. The main distinction was that in Filmation's series, Batman and Robin were voiced by Adam West and Burt Ward, the lead actors of the 1960s Batman live-action series, while on Super Friends they were voiced by Olan Soule and Casey Kasem, who had previously voiced the characters in Filmation's The Batman/Superman Hour.

=== Airdates ===
The New Adventures of Batman premiered February 12, 1977, on CBS. The episodes from this series were later aired along with other Filmation shows — such as Tarzan, Lord of the Jungle (1976, CBS) — as part of The Batman/Tarzan Adventure Hour (1977–1978, CBS), Tarzan and the Super 7 (1978–1980, CBS), and Batman and the Super 7 (1980–1981, NBC).

=== Villains ===
As with the prior Filmation produced Batman series, no backstory or alter ego were presented for Catwoman within the four episodes in which she appeared. The yellow and orange costume design used was unique to the series.

Penguin frequently rolls his 'r's and laughs in a manner similar to Burgess Meredith's portrayal, although he has a high-pitched posh accent. He appears in "Reading, Writing and Wronging", "Birds of a Feather Fool Around Together", and "Have an Evil Day, Parts 1 and 2".

Mr. Freeze appears in the episode "The Deep Freeze". Unlike his appearance in the show's opening credits, Mr. Freeze is shown without the helmet that goes with his freeze suit. He and his henchman Professor Frost plot to steal the N-1000 (a superfast submarine) to pull off the "Crime of the Century". When Batman and Robin raid his hideout, Mr. Freeze manages to freeze both of them and takes Robin with him as he escapes. When Freeze and Professor Frost steal the N-1000, they steer it to the North Pole. When Batman, Robin and Bat-Mite face Mr. Freeze and Professor Frost at the North Pole, Batman and Robin fire a beam that reverses the polarity of Freeze's freeze gun so that it warms up. They then apprehend Freeze and Professor Frost where they are both placed into prison.

The Matt Hagen incarnation of Clayface must apply his special potion daily to maintain his powers as Clayface and often took on the forms of animals. In the episode "Dead Ringers", Hagen forces former criminal-turned-acrobat Kit Martin to help him kidnap Arabian Oil Minister Basil Oram and hold him for a $10 million ransom in exchange for not telling Martin's boss of his criminal record. When Batman attempts to intervene, Clayface stages a car accident to knock him out and stow away in the Batmobile to infiltrate the Batcave, where he learns Batman developed amnesia and uses this to discover Batman's secret identity. Bat-Mite however distracts Clayface long enough for the Bat-Computer to create an antidote for Batman's amnesia. Clayface escapes by water, but Batman pursues him in his Bat-Boat until the former's potion wears off and he nearly drowns due to his inability to swim. Batman saves Hagen and hands him over to the police. In the episode "Curses! Oiled Again", Clayface collaborates with Catwoman to steal a shipment of oil bound for Gotham City during a cold snap and steal the country's oil supply, but Batman, Robin, Batgirl, and Bat-Mite intervene and defeat the villains. In the two-part episode "Have an Evil Day", Zarbor enlists Clayface, Catwoman, the Joker, and the Penguin to keep the Dynamic Duo busy while he steals America's nuclear power plants.

==== Missing villains ====
The Riddler and The Scarecrow were off-limits to the show, as Hanna-Barbera already had the rights to the characters for Challenge of the Superfriends (though The Riddler does appear in the opening credits of the show in a pink-colored costume, and was mentioned being arrested at the beginning of the episode "The Deep Freeze"). Conversely, The Joker was off-limits to Challenge of the Superfriends and did not appear on the competing show, though he was planned to be a Legion of Doom member.

== Episodes ==
No.	Title	Villain(s)	Written by
1	"The Pest"	The Joker	Chuck Menville; Len Janson
The Joker steals an experimental hydrogen-powered car while disguising himself as the inventor, but without his knowledge of the car's weakness.
2	"The Moonman"	The Moonman	Chuck Menville; Len Janson
Bruce Wayne's college friend, the astronaut Scott Rogers, has been infected with space waves that cause him to turn into the super-powered Moonman during the full moon.
3	"Trouble Identity"	Catwoman	Bill Danch; Jim Ryan
Catwoman steals a machine that changes trash into fine fabrics, and frames Batgirl for the theft.
4	"A Sweet Joke on Gotham City"	Sweet Tooth	Mark Fink
Sweet Tooth executes a plot 4 out of 5 dentists would reject: to turn Gotham City's water supply into chocolate syrup for a $10 million ransom.
5	"The Bermuda Rectangle"	Professor Bubbles	Arthur Nadel
A villain named Professor Bubbles and his henchman, Flow, capture ships carrying pieces to a weapon he can use to take over the world.
6	"Bite-Sized"	Electro	Len Janson
The alien villain Electro shrinks Batman and Robin and mind controls them to help him steal government secrets.
7	"Reading, Writing & Wronging"	The Penguin	Mark Fink
The Penguin opens a crime school and steals Batman and Robin's utility belts.
8	"The Chameleon"	The Chameleon	Chuck Menville
A shapeshifting villain named the Chameleon plans to shut down Gotham City's new lunar/solar collector.
9	"He Who Laughs Last"	The Joker	Arthur Nadel
The Joker escapes from prison, planning to get revenge on Batman and Robin by giving them a series of clues linked to his crimes.
10	"The Deep Freeze"	Mr. Freeze	Mark Fink
After seeing a news bulletin where Gotham City Police has announced the capture of the Joker, the Riddler, and seven of the most wanted criminals by Batman and Robin, Mr. Freeze and his henchman Professor Frost plan to steal the N-1000 (a superfast submarine) to pull off the crime of the century.
11	"Dead Ringers"	Clayface	Len Janson
Clayface poses as Batman and forces a reformed criminal turned circus acrobat to pose as Robin in order to abduct Arab oil minister Basil Oram.
12	"Curses! Oiled Again!"	Clayface, Catwoman	Chuck Menville; Len Janson
During a cold snap, Catwoman and Clayface join forces to steal oil. At the same time, a TV newscaster named Boyd Baxter seeks to show up Batman.
13	"Birds of a Feather Fool Around Together"	The Penguin, the Joker	Chuck Menville; Len Janson
In order to win a criminals' election against the Joker, the Penguin invents the "Crime Slime", which can turn people into criminals. It makes him and Bat-Mite switch bodies and also seems to affect Batman and Robin.
14	"Have an Evil Day (Part 1)"	Zarbor, the Joker, the Penguin, Clayface, Catwoman	TBA
Zarbor, a criminal from Bat-Mite's home dimension of Ergo, comes to Earth, enlisting Batman's enemies to keep the Caped Crusaders busy while he steals America's nuclear power plants.
15	"Have an Evil Day (Part 2)"	Zarbor, the Joker, the Penguin, Clayface, Catwoman	TBA
Batman and Robin, the villains, and Bat-Mite follow Zarbor back to Ergo, hoping to foil his takeover plans, and recover the stolen nuclear power plants.
16	"This Looks Like a Job for Bat-Mite!"	Zarbor	Chuck Menville; Len Janson
Zarbor escapes jail in Ergo and returns to Earth, planning to become its ruler – with help from the Dynamic Duo.

== Home media ==
The New Adventures of Batman was released on DVD on June 26, 2007, by Warner Home Video (via DC Entertainment and Warner Bros. Family Entertainment); all 16 episodes are collected, and are presented in their original, uncut broadcast presentations and in original airdate order. A retrospective detailing the creation of the series titled Dark Vs. Light: Filmation and The Batman featuring Filmation historian Michael Swanigan and Filmation founder Lou Scheimer is also included.

The first episode, "The Pest", was released along with an episode of Tarzan, Lord of the Jungle in the Saturday Morning Cartoons: The 1970s Vol. 1 DVD, also released by Warner Home Video.

Warner Bros. Home Entertainment released the series on Blu-ray on June 25, 2024.

== Legacy ==
Homage was paid to The New Adventures of Batman in a 1998 episode of Bruce Timm's The New Batman Adventures. In the DVD release audio commentary for the 1998-1999 season, Timm and the rest of the series creators (writer Paul Dini, director Dan Riba, artist Glen Murakami, and storyboarder James Tucker) explain that the first segment of the October 10, 1998, episode "Legends of the Dark Knight" purposely makes use of the same designs The New Adventures of Batman used for the Joker, Batman and Robin, as well as the same color schemes and shading in a nod to both The New Adventures of Batman and to Batman artist Dick Sprang, whose style heavily influenced the visuals of the Filmation cartoon (along with Neal Adams). They further explain that the episode segment also purposely makes use of the trademark silliness and corny tone of the original series (which differs from the darker, serious tone of Timm's series) and also mimics the low frame rate animation style used by Filmation.
