= The Tarzan/Lone Ranger Adventure Hour =

- Also known as: The Tarzan/Lone Ranger/Zorro Adventure Hour
- Written by: Arthur Browne Jr. Andy Heyward; Dennis Marks; Tom Ruegger; Misty Stewart-Taggart; Fran Striker; George W. Trendle
- Theme music composer: Ray Ellis; Norm Prescott
- Country of origin: United States
- Original language: English

Production
- Producers: Don Christensen; Norm Prescott; Lou Scheimer
- Cinematography: R.W. Pope
- Editors: Ron Fedele; Joe Gall; Hector C. Gika; Tom Gleason; Jim Puente; Robert Waxman
- Running time: 60 minutes
- Production company: Filmation

Original release
- Network: CBS
- Release: September 13, 1980 – 1982

Related
- Tarzan and the Super 7

The Tarzan/Lone Ranger Adventure Hour is an American animated television series produced by Filmation that aired on CBS during the early 1980s.

The series consisted of reruns of Tarzan, Lord of the Jungle paired with new episodes of Filmation's versions of The Lone Ranger and, in the second season, The New Adventures of Zorro, at which point the series was retitled The Tarzan/Lone Ranger/Zorro Adventure Hour. The series ran from 1980 to 1982.

Don Diamond who voiced Sergeant Gonzales in this animated series previously portrayed Corporal Reyes in Disney's 1950s live-action series of Zorro.

== Voice cast ==
=== Tarzan, Lord of the Jungle (1980–1982) ===
- Robert Ridgely as Tarzan

=== The Lone Ranger (1980–1982) ===
14 episodes, each consisting of two 15-minute shorts.

- William Conrad as The Lone Ranger (credited as "J. Darnoc", Conrad spelled backwards)
- Ivan Naranjo as Tonto
- Frank Welker as various characters (uncredited)

=== The New Adventures of Zorro (1981–1982) ===
- Henry Darrow as Zorro / Don Diego de la Vega
- Julio Medina as Miguel
- Eric Mason as Captain Ramon
- Don Diamond as Sergeant Gonzales

== Home media ==
BCI Eclipse Entertainment (under its Ink & Paint classic animation entertainment brand) released The Lone Ranger (which was formerly owned by Entertainment Rights and was later acquired by Classic Media, then it was bought by DreamWorks Animation in 2012 and renamed into DreamWorks Classics and ultimately become the property of Universal Studios as of 2016) and The New Adventures of Zorro on DVD. However, the rights to the Tarzan property rest with the estate and company of Edgar Rice Burroughs, and as such, their authorization is needed from Warner Bros. Television Distribution (the latter series’ current distributor) for the series to be released.

- The New Adventures of The Lone Ranger and Zorro - Volume One (December 18, 2007)
- The New Adventures of The Lone Ranger and Zorro - Volume Two (July 15, 2008)
