= The New Adventures of Flash Gordon =

1979 animated television series

- Title card
- Genre: Superhero
- Created by: Alex Raymond
- Based on: Flash Gordon by Alex Raymond
- Voices of: Robert Ridgely; Diane Pershing; Bob Holt; Vic Perrin; Alan Oppenheimer
- Theme music composer: Ray Ellis; Norm Prescott
- Country of origin: United States
- Original language: English
- No. of seasons: 2
- No. of episodes: 24

Production
- Executive producers: Norm Prescott; Lou Scheimer
- Producer: Don Christensen
- Editors: Earl Biddle; Jim Blodgett
- Production companies: Filmation; King Features Syndicate

Original release
- Network: NBC
- Release: September 22, 1979 – November 6, 1982

The New Adventures of Flash Gordon, also known as The Adventures of Flash Gordon or simply Flash Gordon, is a 1979–1982 animated television series. The series is actually called Flash Gordon but the expanded title is used in official records to distinguish it from previous versions. Filmation produced the series in 1979, partly as a reaction to the mammoth success of Star Wars in 1977. The series was an homage to the original Flash Gordon comic strip and featured many of the original characters, including Flash's girlfriend Dale Arden, and the scientist Hans Zarkov. The series is still regarded as one of the most faithful adaptations, and one of Filmation's finest overall efforts.

The basic story follows Flash and his companions as they travel to Mongo, where they are forced into battle by its ruler, Ming the Merciless, his daughter Princess Aura, and his army of Metal Men. To help their cause the heroes lead the formation of an alliance beginning with King Thun, leader of the Lion People; Prince Barin, ruler of Arboria; and King Vultan, leader of the Hawkmen.

The original project was produced as a made-for-television feature film. When NBC saw the finished work, it was decided to turn the work into an animated TV series. The change in format resulted in the story being significantly expanded with a subplot of Ming secretly giving military technology to Hitler being dropped, as well as being set in the present day rather than during World War II. When the series was canceled after its 2nd season, the original footage was reassembled with the original soundtrack, including the final role of Ted Cassidy, and aired on primetime in 1982 as a TV movie, Flash Gordon: The Greatest Adventure of All. The series was later shown in reruns on the Sci-Fi Channel's Cartoon Quest.

The show marked the first animated Flash Gordon series, although the Flash Gordon character had appeared in animated form before in Popeye Meets the Man Who Hated Laughter. Flash later appeared in the animated series Defenders of the Earth (1986–1987) and Flash Gordon (1996–1997).

== Opening narration ==
Blasting off on a desperate mission to save Earth from the evil plottings of the tyrannical space lord Ming the Merciless. Dr. Hans Zarkov and Dale Arden have joined me, Flash Gordon, on a fantastic journey into worlds where peril and adventure await us.

== Description ==
The animated series' first season follows, more or less, the traditional Flash Gordon mythos, opening with the launch of the rocketship carrying Flash, Dale Arden, and Dr. Zarkov from somewhere in the Eastern Hemisphere (or at least the opening scene shows the ship clearing Earth's atmosphere above Europe and the Middle East). The series actually opens with the crash of the Terran ship into an ocean on Mongo after being attacked during the final approach to the planet.

In the opening scenes, after being captured by Ming's Gill Men, Gordon, Arden, and Zarkov meet King Thun the Lion-man and Prince Barin of the forest-kingdom of Arboria. It is later revealed that an earlier king of all Mongo, more powerful than Ming, was named Gor-dan, and that he strongly resembled Flash.

The remainder of the first season consists of the adventures of Gordon and company across the face of Mongo, in traditional pulp style passing from one near-death situation to another. The protagonists meet Emperor Ming almost immediately, and Ming is revealed as being the classic archetype of the Evil Overlord. Flash later gains the aid of King Vultan, ruler of the Hawkmen, and the bandit chieftain Gundar, the Desert Hawk, as friends and allies. Flash also attracts the attention of many of Mongo's female monarchs, such as the adventurous Queen Undina of Coralia; the kindly, smoky-voiced Queen Fria of Frigia; Azura, the powerful but delusional Witch-Queen of Syk, former lover of King Gor-dan who believes Flash is his reincarnation; and the strong-willed Queen Desira of Tropica. But the most notable of these admirers is Princess Aura, Ming's daughter. Violence is somewhat limited but not completely absent. Flash carries a ray pistol after the fifth episode, but uses it only occasionally, to set a stump aflame and attract attention, to bring down an avalanche on an attacking monster, to blast through a wall, and occasionally to stun but not kill adversaries. Prince Barin and his men are armed with "ice arrows" that freeze whatever they hit. Most other forces, including King Vultan's Hawk Men, the Frigian "snow troopers", and the royal guard and desert tribesmen of Tropica are armed with conventional ray weapons that disintegrate whatever they hit, as are Ming's forces, mainly composed of robots, although led by human officers. Ship to ship combat does result in the shooting down of several fighters on both sides, and there is a limited amount of hand-to-hand fighting in certain scenes.

== Mongo the Planet ==
Mongo is Earth-like, and is portrayed as boasting a rich variety of biomes, ranging from the polar ice of Frigia, the domain of Queen Fria, to the lush jungle and hot desert of Tropica, Queen Desira's demesne. Vast forests give Prince Barin's realm of Arboria its name, and there are deep and shallow oceans inhabited by many life forms. The most notable of these are the people of Coralia, ruled by Queen Undina and the Mer-Men, who work for Ming as enforcers. Temperature and weather extremes are quite comparable to those of Earth, and the biology of Mongo appears to be based on the same biochemistry as that of Earth. Certainly Flash, Dale, and Hans ingest food from Mongo with no ill effects.

Mongo's surface gravity appears to be a bit less than that of Earth, or at least there are comments on occasion that Terrans are stronger on Mongo than they are on Earth. The difference in surface gravity can not be too great, because Mongo is so Earth-like, and Terrans on Mongo are by no means superhuman.

Mongo's crust is host to highly extensive tunnels and chambers, more so than Earth (as far as is known), including an entire underground realm, Syk, the "witch-kingdom".

== Peoples of Mongo ==
Mongo is home to a variety of races of sapient life, though the most common breed appears, at least on the surface, to be classic Homo sapiens. Along with the humans of Mongo, though, are the Lion-men, a race of humanoid cat-creatures, the Hawk-men, who have angel-like wings on their backs and are skilled aerial fliers, the undersea people of Coralia, a race of waterbreathers who are apparently descended from air-breathing Humans, a race of giants found (at least) in Frigia, Ming's infamous Lizard-men and Lizard-women, reptilian, tailed humanoids apparently dedicated to Ming, and the Beast-men, a race of primitive humanoids kept artificially primitive by Ming. Additionally, Ming rules a race of 'Gill-men' who breathe water and who are separate from (and enemies to) the water-breathing Humans of Coralia. The "witch-men" of Syk appear to be other than human, as they are gray-skinned and have fewer than five fingers on each hand, but their voluminous robes conceal all else.

This huge variety of humanoid life seems an improbable result of purely Darwinian evolution. At the very least, it is known that the people of Coralia adapted themselves artificially to underwater existence, and in fact retain the technology to transform air breathers such as Flash and Dale and Hans into water-breathers, and back again. They do appear to be unable to create beings able to operate in both media, one is either an air or a water breather. This is discarded in the final episode when Undina and a troop of Coralian sea warriors arrive to participate in the final battle and advance onto land to take the fortress guarding Ming's capital.

It would seem likely, but unconfirmed, that many of the various races of Mongo are the result of genetic manipulation, eugenic projects, and other artificial means of inducing change, over the course of Mongo's vast history. Probably H. sapiens is the base stock for most if not all Mongo's living intelligent races, but the points of divergence would likely date very far back in the past.

== Ming the Merciless ==
The chief villain of the series is Ming the Merciless. Cruel, cold, arrogant, avaricious, ruthless, and Machiavellian, Ming is the epitome of the tyrant, yet he is brilliant, referred to by some as the greatest scientist in the universe, and politically and diplomatically capable. He is skilled in personal combat, but feels no compulsion to engage in it when misdirection will work as well.

His personal race is unclear, his ears are pointed, his teeth seem fanged, his frame oddly thin yet very strong and claims to be immortal, with some supporting evidence. He also appears to have some Asian features, a stark contrast to that of his daughter, Princess Aura.

His sexual tastes seem varied, to judge by the various types of female we see in glimpses of his harem, but he seems to find Dale Arden particularly attractive, and his daughter Aura seems to be a Homo sapiens, so presumably Ming is not very alien. His origin may tie into the nature of Syk, the Witch-Kingdom, as the series reveals a legend of a one-time King Gor-dan of Syk, to whom Ming served as High Priest.

His resources are immense, with armies of robots, armies of humans and other species, a fleet of armed rocket ships and spacecraft and access to even more impressive technologies. Ming does seem to fear the possibility of a united rebellion on Mongo, because he seems to work to keep the races at each other's throats.

== Season 2 ==
When a second season of episodes was ordered for autumn 1982, NBC insisted the serial format be dropped and that the stories be more episodic. This resulted in the addition of the pet dragon Gremlin, an artist in mouth-blown smoke. Each episode was made of two short stories instead of a full length episode. The second season was not so well received (and was not seen in some areas, due to being scheduled at 12:30 pm Eastern/11:30 am Central and thus often competing with sports coverage) and the program was canceled shortly after its completion.

The program was later shown in reruns on the Sci Fi Channel as part of Sci Fi Cartoon Quest.

== International broadcasts ==
Flash Gordon was sold to several overseas broadcasters. In the Republic of Ireland, RTÉ One aired Flash Gordon as part of its lineup of children's programs.

== Episodes ==
=== Season 1 (1979–1980) ===
No.	Title	Directed by	Written by	Original release date
1	"A Planet in Peril"	Unknown	Samuel A. Peeples	September 22, 1979
2	"The Monsters of Mongo"	Unknown	Samuel A. Peeples	September 29, 1979
3	"Vultan - King of the Hawkmen"	Unknown	Ted Pedersen	October 6, 1979
4	"To Save Earth"	Unknown	Samuel A. Peeples	October 13, 1979
5	"The Beast Men's Prey"	Unknown	Samuel A. Peeples	October 20, 1979
6	"Into the Water World"	Unknown	Ted Pedersen	October 27, 1979
7	"Adventure in Arboria"	Unknown	Ted Pedersen	November 3, 1979
8	"The Frozen World"	Unknown	Ted Pedersen	November 10, 1979
9	"Monster of the Glacier"	Unknown	Ted Pedersen	November 17, 1979
10	"Blue Magic"	Unknown	Samuel A. Peeples	November 24, 1979
11	"King Flash"	Unknown	Samuel A. Peeples	December 1, 1979
12	"Tournament of Death"	Unknown	Samuel A. Peeples	December 8, 1979
13	"Castaways in Tropica"	Unknown	Ted Pedersen	December 15, 1979
14	"The Desert Hawk"	Unknown	Ted Pedersen	December 22, 1979
15	"Revolt of the Power Men"	Unknown	Ted Pedersen	December 29, 1979
16	"Ming's Last Battle"	Unknown	Ted Pedersen	January 5, 1980

=== Season 2 (1982) ===
No.	Title	Directed by	Written by	Original release date
17a	"Gremlin the Dragon"	Unknown	Tom Ruegger	September 18, 1982
17b	"Royal Wedding"	Unknown	Paul Dini	September 18, 1982
18a	"Sir Gremlin"	Unknown	Tom Ruegger	September 25, 1982
18b	"Deadly Double"	Unknown	Paul Dini	September 25, 1982
19a	"The Game"	Unknown	Dan DiStefano	October 2, 1982
19b	"The Seed"	Unknown	J. Michael Reaves	October 2, 1982
20a	"Witch Woman"	Unknown	Paul Dini	October 9, 1982
20b	"Micro Menace"	Unknown	J. Michael Reaves	October 9, 1982
21a	"Flash Back"	Unknown	Dan DiStefano	October 16, 1982
21b	"The Warrior"	Unknown	Ria Parody	October 16, 1982
22a	"The Freedom Balloon"	Unknown	Dan DiStefano	October 23, 1982
22b	"Sacrifice of the Volcano Men"	Unknown	Dan DiStefano	October 23, 1982
23a	"Beware of Gifts"	Unknown	Dan DiStefano	October 30, 1982
23b	"The Memory Bank of Ming"	Unknown	Dan DiStefano	October 30, 1982
24a	"Survival Game"	Unknown	Paul Dini	November 6, 1982
24b	"Gremlin's Finest Hour"	Unknown	J. Michael Reaves	November 6, 1982

== DVD releases ==
Delta Home Entertainment in the UK on Region 2 DVD on August 15, 2005, released a 3-disc set of the complete series to "The New Adventures Of Flash Gordon". There were no special features in this set, and it was discontinued.

BCI Eclipse Entertainment LLC (under its Ink & Paint classic animation entertainment label) (under license from Hearst Entertainment) released The New Adventures of Flash Gordon: The Complete Series on DVD in Region 1 on July 18, 2006. The 4-disc set includes all 24 episodes of the series, uncut and digitally remastered and presented in original broadcast presentation and storyline continuity order, as well as many special features that were included.

As of 2009, this release has been discontinued and is out of print as BCI Eclipse ceased operations.

In 2009, Mill Creek Entertainment released a 2-disc set of the first 14 episodes of season 1 titled: "The Adventures of Flash Gordon" with no additional special features.

== Voice acting credits ==
- Flash Gordon, Prince Barin: Robert Ridgely
- Dale Arden, Queen Undina, Queen Fria, Queen Azura, Queen Desira: Diane Pershing
- Dr. Hans Zarkov, Gundar the Desert Hawk, Ming the Merciless: Alan Oppenheimer
- Thun the Lion Man, King Vultan: Allan Melvin
- Princess Aura: Melendy Britt
- Narrator, Gremlin, additional voices: Lou Scheimer
