= Egg (disambiguation) =

An egg is an organic vessel in which an embryo develops.

Egg, EGG, eggs, or similar terms may also refer to:

== Biology ==
- Egg cell, the female reproductive cell (gamete) in oogamous organisms

== Food ==
- Eggs as food

== Places ==
- Egg, Austria
- Egg, Switzerland

== People ==
- Antonio Brack Egg (1940–2014), former Peruvian Minister of the Environment
- Augustus Egg (1816–1863), English artist
- Mr Egg (born 1959), Scottish musician, born James Matthew McDonald
- Oscar Egg (1890–1961), Swiss racing cyclist

== Arts, entertainment, and media ==
=== Fictional entities ===
- Egg, the name of the inhabited neutron star in the book Dragon's Egg by Robert L. Forward
- Aegon V Targaryen, nicknamed "Egg", a titular character from the Tales of Dunk and Egg stories by George R. R. Martin
- Ann Veal, also known as Egg, a character on the show Arrested Development
- The Egg, an antagonist featured in two episodes of the animated series Count Duckula; "00 Duck", series 3, episode 12 (1991) and "Venice a Duck, Not a Duck!", series 4, episode 13 (1991)
- Eggs Trubshaw, the protagonist of the 2014 animated film The Boxtrolls
- Edgar "Egg" Cooke, a character in the television series This Life

=== Films ===
- Egg (2005 film), a Japanese film
- Egg (2007 film), a Turkish-Greek drama
- Egg (2018 film), an American comedy film
- Eggs (film) a 1995 Norwegian comedy

=== Games ===
- Egg (video game), a 1981 video game
- Eggs (video game), a 1983 video game
- EGG Console, a brand of classic games by D4 Enterprise
- Elemental Gimmick Gear, a 1999 video game

=== Music ===
==== Groups ====
- Egg (band), English group founded 1969
- Eggs (band), an American group founded 1990
- The Egg (band), a British electronic dance music band

==== Albums ====
- Egg (album), an album by English group Egg

=== Television ===
- The Eggs, an Australian-Canadian animated series
- EGG, the Arts Show, a TV program
- eGG HD, a TV channel by Astro Malaysia, focusing on e-sports
- "🥚" (Battle for Dream Island), a 2025 animated web series episode

=== Other arts, entertainment, and media ===
- Egg (magazine), a Japanese style magazine published since 1995
- Eggs (novel), a novel by Jerry Spinelli, published in 2007
- "The Egg" (de Camp short story), a short story by L. Sprague de Camp published in 1956
- "The Egg" (Weir short story) a short story by Andy Weir published in 2009

== Brands and enterprises ==
- Egg (car), a Swiss car make in business from 1896 to 1919
- Egg (chair), a chair designed by Arne Jacobsen in 1958
- EG&G, an American defense contractor, founded in 1931 and defunct since 2009
- Egg Banking, a British internet bank established in 1996
- Egg London, a famous nightclub in England
- L'Oeuf (the Egg), an aluminum and plexiglass car designed by Paul Arzens

== Science and technology ==
- EGG (file format), a compressed archive file format used in computers
- Electrogastrogram, a graphic showing electrical signals in the stomach muscles
- Electroglottograph, a device for measuring vocal fold movement
- Evaporating gaseous globule, a type of interstellar gas cloud that is thought to give rise to new stars

== Other uses ==
- Darning egg, a sewing tool
- EGG Project, or Global Consciousness Project, a parapsychology experiment begun in 1998 at Princeton University
- Erbgesundheitsgericht, the Genetic Health Court of Nazi Germany
- Cosmic egg, a mythological motif found in the cosmogonies of many cultures and civilizations
- Egging, the act of throwing eggs at people or property
- Egg, an LGBTQ slang term for a transgender person who has not yet realized that they are trans
- Easter egg, an egg decorated for the holiday Easter
- Easter egg (media), a secret message hidden in media

== See also ==
- Egg Island (disambiguation)
- Egge (disambiguation)
- Egged (disambiguation)
- Golden egg (disambiguation)
- The Egg (disambiguation)
