= Nimona =

Fantasy webcomic by ND Stevenson

- Cover of the print edition
- Author: ND Stevenson
- Current status/schedule: Concluded
- Publisher: HarperCollins (2015 print edition)
- Genre(s): Action-adventure; Science fantasy Comedy drama Thriller

Nimona is a science fantasy graphic novel by American cartoonist ND Stevenson. The story follows the title character, a shapeshifter who joins the disgraced knight Ballister Blackheart in his plans to destroy the over-controlling Institute. Blackheart's intent to operate under his code of ethics contrasts with Nimona's natural impulsivity.

Stevenson began working on Nimona while attending the Maryland Institute College of Art, revisiting a character he had created in high school. Stevenson published Nimona as a webcomic from 2012 through 2014, initially through Tumblr, developing the story and the art style as time progressed. The finished work ultimately doubled as his senior thesis. After an agent reached out to Stevenson, HarperCollins released Nimona in print form in 2015. It has been translated into at least 16 other languages and adapted into an audiobook.

Nimona's accolades include an Eisner Award, a Cybils Award, and a Cartoonist Studio Prize. Reviews and academic analyses have highlighted themes of queerness and fluidity of identity and how they oppose and subvert traditional controlling institutions and exclusionary systems.

An animated film of the same name was released on Netflix on June 30, 2023, to critical success and was nominated for the Academy Award for Best Animated Feature at the 96th Academy Awards, but lost to The Boy and the Heron.

== Plot ==
Nimona is a shape-shifter, usually a human girl, but able to grow and shrink and take any human or animal form. She insists on being the sidekick to Ballister Blackheart. Blackheart was once a knight for the Institution but lost an arm in a joust with Ambrosius Goldenloin – now the Institution's champion – so he was kicked out. Blackheart seeks to destroy the Institution but operates under his own code of ethics. Nimona pushes to make his plans more violent and often kills people. They discover the Institution is using jaderoot, a poisonous plant used for dark magic. Blackheart has Nimona impersonate a TV news anchor to publicize this and plant poisonous, but nonfatal, apples in markets to spread fear. The Institute's director orders Goldenloin to kill Nimona; instead, he meets Blackheart in a tavern, begging him to send Nimona away instead.

Blackheart meets Dr. Meredith Blitzmeyer, who has made a device powered by "anomalous energy". When Nimona is near the device, she cannot transform. Goldenloin continues to refuse orders to kill him; it is hinted that Blackheart and Goldenloin were more than just friends. He agrees to kill Nimona and capture Blackheart. At a public event, the two spread more poison, and while people panic about its effects, Blackheart speaks and convinces people to rebel against the Institution. He is captured by Goldenloin and used as a trap to lure Nimona. Her head is sliced off during the fight, but she lives and they escape. Blackheart questions her powers, and she lets slip that her earlier story – that a witch cast a spell on her as a child – was made up. They argue, and Nimona leaves Blackheart.

Blackheart learns that his poison has caused deaths. He sneaks into a hospital to treat poison victims but is captured. Goldenloin guards him, having been demoted from champion. The two talk, and Goldenloin admits that the jousting incident was not an accident. The Director offered him the position of champion on the condition that he win the joust against Blackheart and gave him an explosive lance to ensure his victory. He initially refused; however, after losing the joust, he activated the lance in desperation. Blackheart is brought to an Institution laboratory, where the Director reveals their occult experiments to develop weapons. Nimona is imprisoned there; she had attempted to rescue Blackheart but was captured in a self-repairing vessel built to contain jaderoot. They take a blood sample out, but Nimona still has control over the cells, and they turn into a colossal beast that escapes to kill the Director and ravage the city. A flashback shows Nimona trapped by villagers. She claimed to be one of their children, but they believed she was a changeling impersonating a child who died; it is never confirmed which scenario is the truth. The Institution took Nimona and experimented on her.

Blackheart tells Goldenloin about Blitzmeyer's device, which he uses to fight the beast. The human form of Nimona learns that Blackheart revealed the device and turns on him. Blackheart defeats the beast, but the fight damages the lab and activates its automatic purge system. Blackheart escapes, carrying Goldenloin, but Nimona does not. The disasters make clear the Institution's use of jaderoot, and Blackheart becomes a hero. While watching over Goldenloin in the hospital, a doctor calls Nimona a monster, and Blackheart insists she is not. When the same doctor returns moments later, Blackheart realizes that the first "doctor" was Nimona. He chases after her, but she disappears into the crowd. Blackheart and Blitzmeyer find a lab together, and Goldenloin and Blackheart become closer. Blackheart never sees Nimona again, to his knowledge, but wonders about every stranger and animal who looks at him.

== Development and publication ==
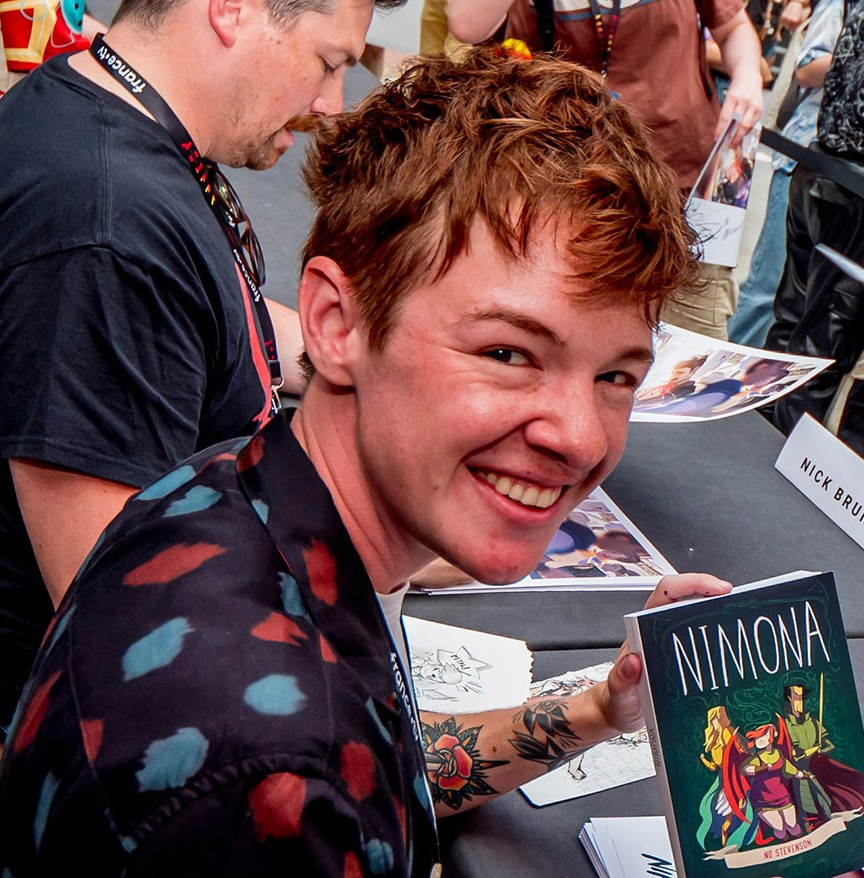
ND Stevenson, the creator of Nimona, in 2023

In a course at Maryland Institute College of Art, ND Stevenson received an assignment to create a new character, and revisited an idea from high school of a female shapeshifter. According to Stevenson, he created Nimona by combining this shapeshifter with a Joan of Arc-inspired character that he was drawing at the time. Nimona's look was based on his own experiences with cosplay; Stevenson preferred cosplaying as male characters rather than female characters, and wanted "to do a costume that people who weren't interested in looking particularly buxom or sensual might want to dress as". Other characters and a story followed as Stevenson revisited the concept several times over his junior year, and later received approval for the comic to be his senior thesis.

Stevenson initially published Nimona online on Tumblr. The comic began as a collection of one- and two-page comics. Stevenson says that he "had no idea what Nimona was when I started it" and that it was experimental, but that he knew very early how it would end. According to Stevenson, an agent reached out to him shortly after he had posted the first few pages. Stevenson was still at school when he learned his agent had sold Nimona to the publisher HarperCollins.

The webcomic ran from June 2012 to September 2014. Stevenson described completing Nimona as both satisfying and "a little sad". HarperCollins published the completed comic as a young adult graphic novel in May 2015. The work has since been translated into several other languages, including Chinese, Czech, Dutch, French, German, Hebrew, Hungarian, Indonesian, Italian, Norwegian, Portuguese, Russian, Slovak, Spanish, and Turkish.

In August 2016, an audiobook version of Nimona was published through Audible. It features voicework by Rebecca Soler, Jonathan Davis, Marc Thompson, January LaVoy, Natalie Gold, Peter Bradbury, and David Pittu, has a runtime of two hours and seventeen minutes, and is unabridged.

== Analysis ==
Reviews and academic analyses have presented Nimona as a depiction of identity, particularly fluid identity. Nimona's form is unsettled and indefinable, though Mihaela Precup said that Nimona's queerness was mostly hinted at through linguistic markers and fashion choices. Precup noted the "subversive potential of a specific kind of queer cuteness", while James J. Donahue said that Nimona shows the fluidity of identity construction to a young-adult audience along with empowering moments. Ballister's perceived identity also shifts from a supervillain to a hero, challenging clichés around good and evil. Nimona has been highlighted as promoting alternate perspectives on gender and allowing readers to come to terms with their own identities.

Nimona's monstrous nature has been discussed as representing how institutions perceive queerness as the "ultimate other" that threatens stability. Multiple analyses have viewed the Institution as one that persecutes queerness and establishes heteronormative hegemonic ideologies through structural violence. Nimona presents a potential to challenge and abolish these systems. In this way, the comic has been compared to The Legend of Korra and Steven Universe. One paper on the work concluded that it is "the blurring of boundaries", especially when it comes to institutions, bodies, and motivations, that allows for these institutions to be undermined.

== Reception ==
=== Awards ===
Nimona won an Eisner Award, a Cybils Award, and a Cartoonist Studio Prize. It was also nominated for another Eisner Award and a National Book Award. The hardcover collection of Nimona became a New York Times bestseller.

Award nominations for Nimona
| Year | Category | Institution or publication | Result | Notes | Ref. |
|---|---|---|---|---|---|
| 2012 | Best Web Comic | Cartoonist Studio Prize | Won | | |
| 2015 | Young People's Literature | National Book Awards | Nominated | Stevenson, at 23, was possibly the youngest NBA nominee in any category this year. | |
| 2015 | Young Adult Graphic Novels | Cybils Award | Won | | |
| 2015 | Best Digital/Webcomic | Eisner Awards | Nominated | | |
| 2016 | Best Graphic Album—Reprint | Eisner Awards | Won | Reprint by Harper Teen | |

=== Reviews ===
Nimona received acclaim. Lauren Davis, reviewing the book for io9, rated Nimona as one of the "Best New and Short Webcomics of 2012", while Paste Magazine called Nimona the best webcomic of 2014. A review for CNN recommended Nimona specifically for teenage readers. Reviewers noted the science fantasy setting which mixes magic with technology and highlighted the conflict between Blackheart's code of honor against Nimona's desire to kill and steal. Iain A. MacInnes, a scholar who focuses on U.S. popular and youth culture, said that Nimona added to the varieties of medieval aesthetics in modern media.

The artwork has been described as light and sketchy and compared to that of Kate Beaton, Eleanor Davis, and Faith Erin Hicks. Stevenson produced Nimona a page at a time, resulting in a development of art style over time. Alex Browm, reviewing the book for Tor.com, said that while the art in the first two chapters was "clunky", Stevenson's technique improved as the work progressed, and by the fifth chapter, Brown said it was "an absolute joy to look at."

== Film adaptation ==
In 2015, 20th Century Fox Animation acquired the rights for an animated feature film adaptation. It was being produced by Fox's subsidiary Blue Sky Studios, with Patrick Osborne to direct and Marc Haimes to write the script.

On May 7, 2019, after The Walt Disney Company's acquisition of Fox, the film was delayed from February 14, 2020, to March 5, 2021; it was later delayed again to January 14, 2022. In February 2021, Disney announced that it was shutting down Blue Sky Studios and that the film adaptation was canceled. After its cancellation, and again amid the controversy of Disney's involvement in Florida's "Don't Say Gay" bill, several former Blue Sky staff members spoke to media about the film. They stated that, when canceled, the film was "75% complete" and that it was to include an "I love you" scene between Blackheart and Goldenloin and a same-sex kiss. Staff also stated that they received pushback from Disney leadership, centered around the film's LGBT themes.

On April 11, 2022, it was announced the film had been picked up by Netflix and Annapurna Pictures with DNEG Animation on board as animation studio and a June 30, 2023, release date. Nick Bruno and Troy Quane served as the film's new directors, having worked on the project since 2020, with Robert L. Baird and Lloyd Taylor rewriting the script and Chloë Grace Moretz and Riz Ahmed returning to voice Nimona and Ballister Blackheart, renamed "Boldheart", respectively, along with Eugene Lee Yang as Ambrosius Goldenloin.

== See also ==
- Portrayal of women in American comics
- Lumberjanes, a comic book series co-created by Stevenson
