= The Egg =

The Egg may refer to:

== Music ==
- The Egg (band), British electronic music group
- The Egg (album), by American band Shiner, or the title song
- The Egg, a 2013 live album recorded in 2011 by Mike Gordon
- "Albany", also known as "The Egg", a song by They Might Be Giants from Venue Songs
- "The Egg", a track by the British electronic group Autechre from the 1992 compilation album Artificial Intelligence

== Film and television ==
- The Egg (film), a 1922 film featuring Stan Laurel

=== Television episodes ===
- "The Egg", American Dragon: Jake Long season 1, episode 8a (2005)
- "The Egg", Big and Small series 3, episode 23 (2011)
- "The Egg", French and Saunders episode 39 (2002)
- "The Egg", Hot Streets season 1, episode 4 (2018)
- "The Egg", Liverspots and Astronots episode 8 (2018)
- "The Egg", Our Miss Brooks season 2, episode 26 (1954)
- "The Egg", Space Chickens in Space episode 2b (2018)
- "The Egg", The Amazing World of Gumball season 3, episode 40 (2015)
- "The Egg", Wander Over Yonder season 1, episode 1b (2013)
- "The Egg", Yoko! Jakamoko! Toto! episode 3b (2003)

== Writing ==
- "The Egg" (de Camp short story), written by L. Sprague de Camp
- "The Egg" (Weir short story), written by Andy Weir

== Theatre ==
- The Egg, Albany, performing arts venue in Albany, New York, USA
- The Egg, Bath, a venue in Bath, England, UK
- The Egg, Beirut, an abandoned theatre structure in Beirut, Lebanon
- The Egg, National Centre for the Performing Arts (China), Beijing, China

== Other uses ==
- Instagram egg, a picture of a brown egg that became a meme
- The Egg (roundabout), road junction in Tamworth, England
- The Egg (L'Oeuf), an aluminum and plexiglass car designed by Paul Arzens

== See also ==
- Egg (disambiguation)
- The Egg and I (disambiguation)
- The Lost Egg (disambiguation)
- The Egg Tree, novel by Katherine Milhous
- The Egg and Jerry, a Tom and Jerry short
