= ND Stevenson =

American cartoonist and producer (born 1991)

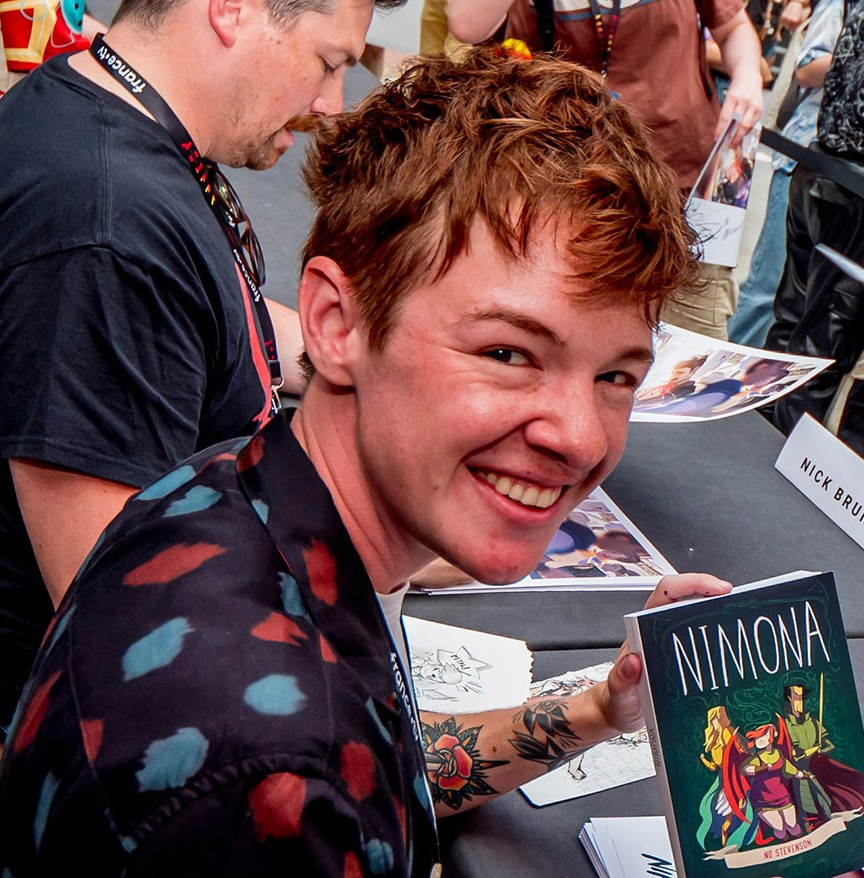
- Stevenson in 2023
- Born: Noelle Diana Stevenson; December 31, 1991 (age 34); Columbia, South Carolina, U.S.
- Other names: Nate Diana Stevenson; Indy Stevenson
- Education: Maryland Institute College of Art
- Occupation: Cartoonist
- Known for: Nimona (creator); Lumberjanes (co-writer); She-Ra and the Princesses of Power (creator, showrunner, and executive producer)
- Spouse: Lee Knox Ostertag (m. 2019)

Nate Diana "Indy" Stevenson (born Noelle Diana Stevenson, December 31, 1991), known professionally as ND Stevenson, is an American cartoonist and animation producer. He is the developer, showrunner, and executive producer of the animated television series She-Ra and the Princesses of Power, which ran from 2018 to 2020. He is also known for the science fantasy graphic novel Nimona, as co-writer of the comic series Lumberjanes, and The Fire Never Goes Out, his autobiographical collection.

Stevenson's work has won multiple Eisner Awards as well as a Daytime Emmy Award and a GLAAD Media Award. Stevenson is non-binary and transmasculine, and has written about being transgender in his webcomic I'm Fine I'm Fine Just Understand.

== Early life ==
Nate Diana Stevenson was born Noelle Diana Stevenson on December 31, 1991, in Columbia, South Carolina, to Diana and Hal Stevenson. He is the third of five siblings. Stevenson later described his family as "very religious" and said that he had a "very limited diet" as a result. At age 5 or 6, his first exposure to anime was the series Superbook, which he got from a church library, and said he found it "really scary...and a little bit traumatizing", and later said "yes" when another host said it sounded like the "Bible edition" of Drifters.

Stevenson was homeschooled before attending A.C. Flora High School. During his senior year, he created picture books and won a local award in the Visual Literacy Book Production category. In a 2023 interview, Stevenson mentioned Pooh's Grand Adventure: The Search for Christopher Robin (1997), The Prince of Egypt (1998), Star Wars: Attack of the Clones (2002), The Lord of the Rings films, and Project Runway as influences in his childhood and adolescence. He later said that a public school teacher noticed his drive and ensured he met art school representatives, including one from Maryland Institute College of Art (MICA), the first time had "seriously considered going to school just for art," and later said something about Baltimore "felt right" for him.

Stevenson attended MICA, graduating in 2013. While there, Stevenson gained fame as a fan artist under the name "gingerhaze" for his "hipster Lord of the Rings" characters. He later credited various scholarships for making his education at MICA possible, and said he originally attended with the goal of being a children's book illustrator but through a "scheduling accident" he took a class about comics, which served as the birthplace of Nimona.

== Career ==
=== 2012–2013: Nimona and career beginnings ===
During his junior year, he created his soon-to-be popular character Nimona as part of an assignment in one of his classes. In mid-2012, Stevenson began creating a webcomic around the character, also called Nimona, and soon signed with a literary agent who found the webcomic online. The agent helped him sign with HarperCollins to publish Nimona as a graphic novel. Nimona would double as Stevenson's senior thesis in 2012. For his work on Nimona, Stevenson won Slate Magazine's 2012 Cartoonist Studio Prize for Best Web Comic of the Year and the 2016 Eisner Award for Best Graphic Album: Reprint. Stevenson was also named a 2015 National Book Award Finalist for the graphic novel version of Nimona. Stevenson said that the ability to create comics on his own and create Nimona was what got him a "writing job in animation," bringing him into the animation world.

While in school, Stevenson did freelance illustration for Random House, St. Martin's Press, and Label Magazine. In the summer of 2012, Stevenson interned at BOOM! Studios, a comic publishing house in Los Angeles. Stevenson created the cover art for Rainbow Rowell's novel Fangirl, which was published in 2013. He also worked with Ryan North on his book To Be or Not to Be (2013), a choose-your-own-adventure-book based on Shakespeare's Hamlet.

=== 2013–2020: Lumberjanes, She-Ra and The Fire Never Goes Out ===
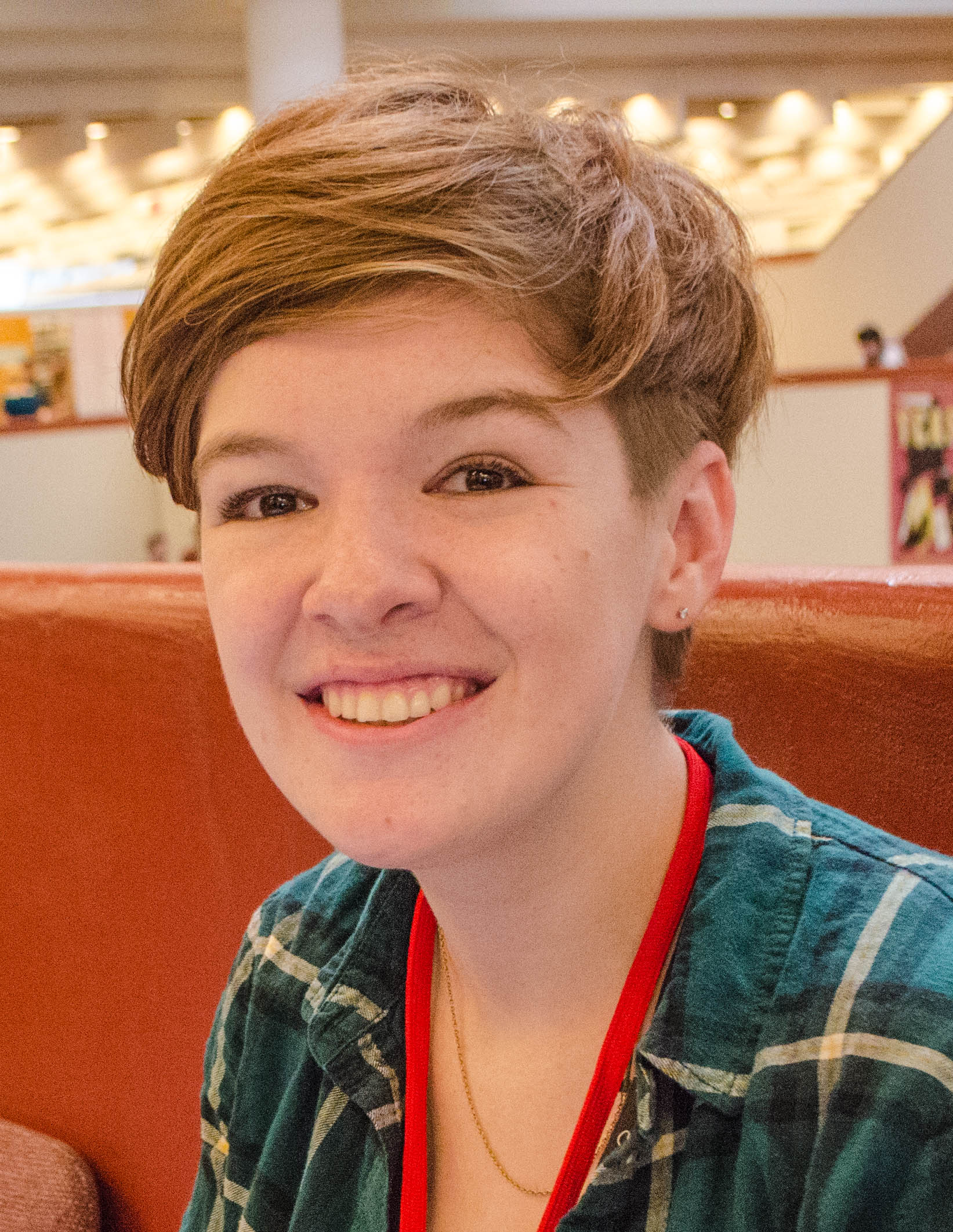
Stevenson in 2015

After his graduation in 2013, Stevenson returned to BOOM! Studios to help develop, and eventually write, Lumberjanes. Lumberjanes won Eisner Awards for Best New Series and Best Publication for Teens in 2015. In 2020, Stevenson was described as executive producer and writer of a one-hour animated special introducing the characters of Lumberjanes, an animated series which will stream on HBO Max. It was also announced that he would write and direct episodes for the main series, while serving an executive producer. He was also described as working on the series in 2021 and 2022. In a June 2023 interview, Stevenson noted he was "developing Lumberjanes" and "figuring out that world."

In 2015, Stevenson wrote for Marvel Comics on the comics Thor Annual and Runaways. He did the cover art for Jennifer Longo's novels Up to This Pointe (hardcover edition) and Six Feet Over It (paperback edition). Stevenson was part of the writing team of Disney's animated series Wander Over Yonder, beginning with the second season in 2015. In 2017, Stevenson appeared in two episodes of Critical Role's first campaign as Tova. He has subsequently appeared in three Critical Role one-shot episodes between 2017 and 2022 as himself, Tova, and Peter Pan. In June 2022, his character Tova was featured in a line of Critical Role miniatures by WizKids.

Stevenson was the creator and executive producer of DreamWorks Animation's rebooted She-Ra and the Princesses of Power animated television series on Netflix, which ran for five seasons from 2018 to 2020. She-Ra received critical acclaim, with particular praise for its diverse cast and the complex relationship between She-Ra and her best friend-turned-archenemy Catra. In 2019, the show was nominated for a GLAAD Media Award for Outstanding Kids & Family Programming, as well as a Daytime Emmy Award at the 46th Daytime Emmy Awards. In 2021, the series was tied with First Day when it won the GLAAD Media Award for Outstanding Kids and Family Programming. In 2023, Stevenson stated that he started playing Dungeons & Dragons when he started developing the series, and stated that his Tiefling warlock character would inspire Glimmer to have teleportation powers, and run out of power at "inconvenient moments" or go into situations without much thought. In a 2023 interview, Stevenson described She-Ra as the "most intensive job" he ever had, and said that once it ended, he "literally had nothing to do for the first time in my life."

His autobiographical collection of drawings and journals, The Fire Never Goes Out, was published in March 2020. The New Yorker's review described it as "a memoir of sorts ... , a coming-out story, a love story, a tale of disorientingly rapid professional triumph, and a story about mental health and illness, showing the young artist figuring out what [he] must do-first to make art and then to get well."

In December 2025, ComicBook reported that She-Ra and the Princesses of Power series may leave Netflix on February 21, 2026, due to the expiration of DreamWorks' license to keep the series on the streaming service. Subsequent coverage by entertainment outlets, including Collider, ComicBook, and CBR, confirmed the removal. These reports highlighted the uncertainty regarding the series' future streaming availability and observed that frustrated fans were threatening to turn to online piracy to access the show. On social media, Stevenson said that this news was not surprising, noting that the same has happened to other DreamWorks series as their Netflix licenses expiring, meaning that "years of hard work by many talented crews have ended up without a home," adding that showrunners have no control of it. He also expressed hope that the entire series would find "a new home," that the series would have a full DVD release, and urged fans to watch the series "while you can, and keep records whenever possible. Its legacy is in your hands."

=== 2021–present: Adaptations and other work ===
In October 2021, Stevenson started a newsletter, titled "I'm Fine I'm Fine Just Understand", which explores topics such as mental health, gender identity, and more, with premium subscribers given access to comics which "reflect more personal/sensitive topics." In August 2022, the newsletter was nominated for a Digital Book of the Year Harvey Award.

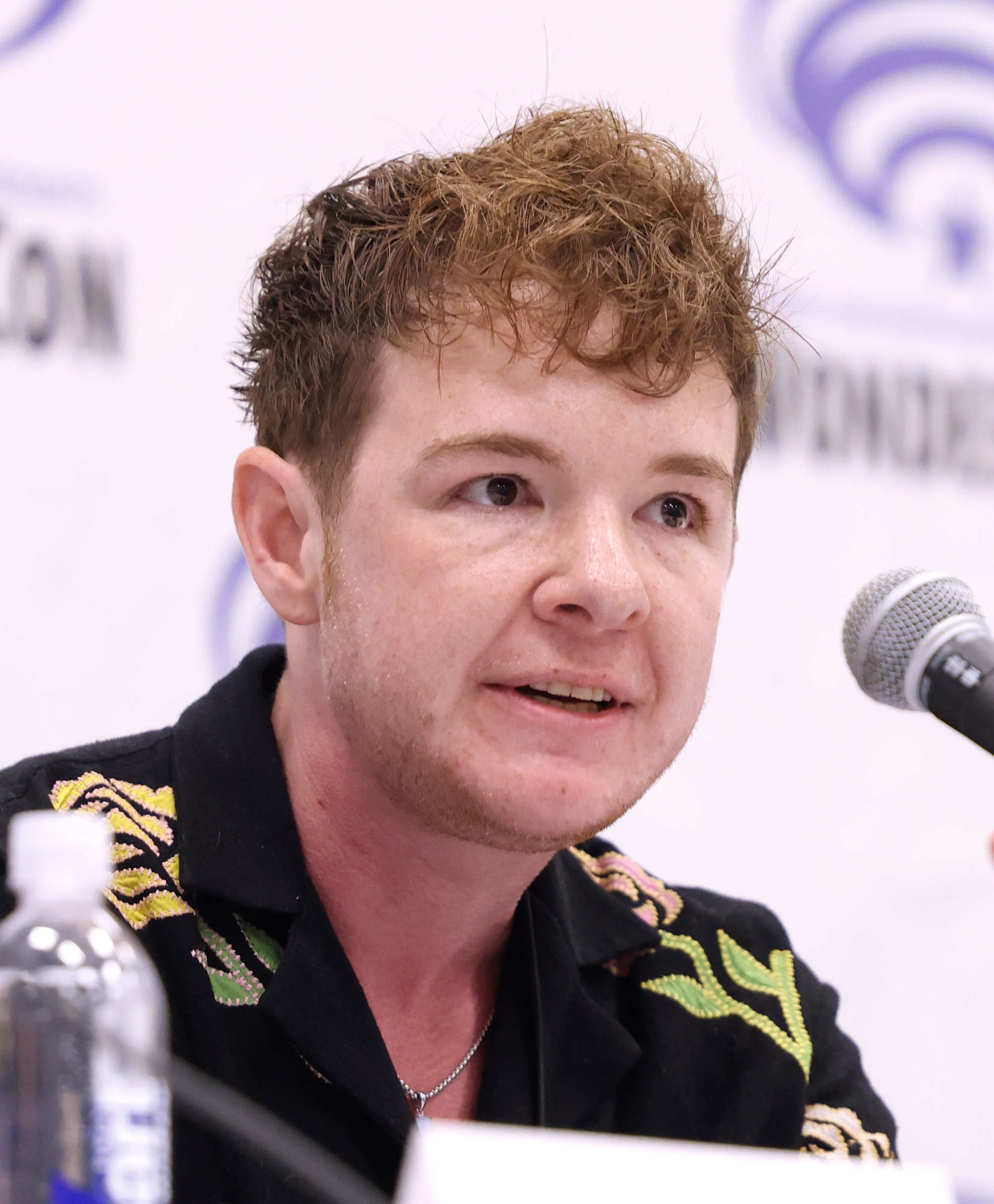
Stevenson at the 2026 WonderCon

On February 4, 2022, Stevenson posted a fan comic of The Book of Boba Fett entitled "This Place Was Home" on Twitter, which received a positive critical reception. The Book of Boba Fett, which was later posted to his newsletter, features Boba Fett, Fennec Shand, Jango Fett, and Zam Wesell, with much of the comics focusing on "Boba's childhood relationship with Zam". In a later interview, Stevenson noted that at a young age, Wesell created a huge impression on him, noting he latched onto Zam because she was a shapeshifter, causing him to come up with a version of the story when Zam lived, "became the main character" in a "whole parallel world" that Stevenson constructed. This interest began his love of shapeshifters, which included "Carrie Kelley in the Batman comics." He also expressed his affinity for Wesell on various other occasions, even stating that Double Trouble in She-Ra and the Princesses of Power is meant as an homage to Wesell. In a 2023 interview, Stevenson said that he gravitated toward Wesell, with the character causing him to want to see more about shapeshifting and "how far you could go with that".

In a June 2023 interview, Stevenson said he worked to ensure that Nimona was portrayed correctly in the animated film, as a character who was at the "heart of the story" rather than an "accessory", and enjoyed his work with the film's directors, Nick Bruno and Troy Quane.

In November 2023, Out listed Stevenson as a "disruptor" who made the world "a better place for LGBTQ+ people." In an interview with the magazine, Stevenson said he was entering a "new creative phase" in his life amid "turbulence of late-stage capitalism". He added that "the world is so much bigger and weirder than we know — when you love someone for who they are, the understanding will follow." In another interview, he hoped for more epic romances and adventures with queer themes, noted that "queer stories also resonate with straight audiences," and argued that despite transphobia and homophobia in the U.S., there is a "little golden age of queer representation on TV" and hoped that creators broadened their imaginations to what is possible, rather than constraining themselves.

In June 2023 Stevenson noted he was working on a "two book series of novels" based on stories predating Nimona, which were originally written in his teenage years. In an interview with TheGamer, Stevenson said that this project originated as a two-book series originally written when he was 12, influenced by Christopher Paolini's Eragon, and was originally 600 pages long. He noted that he is trying to rewrite and illustrate the story, which TheGamer described as "queer and involv[ing]...pirates." In February 2025, the first part of the duology was officially announced as an illustrated middle-grade prose novel titled Scarlet Morning, published by Harper Collins in September 2025.

On September 17, 2025, Stevenson told Comic Book Club that the animated adaptation of Lumberjanes had ended, noting adaptations of the comic went through "many iterations," saying certain issues, including corporate mergers, made working on it "untenable." He noted that the most recent adaptation is "sort of on ice," but opined that it is "a long way from dead" and that he is down to "keep playing with different iterations of it" with the possibility of a stage musical, an RPG, or something else, adding "those conversations are happening. It's just there's nothing solid at this point."

In April 2026, it was announced that Richland Library was, for National Library Week, releasing collectible library cards designed by Stevenson, which were available at each branch of the library. The cards originally debuted at a festival in March, and by April 22nd, 1,100 of these "special-edition cards" had been activated either online or in-person by library patrons.

== Personal life ==
Stevenson married fellow cartoonist Lee Knox Ostertag in September 2019. He began working on She-Ra and the Princesses of Power at the same time that he began dating Ostertag. He described him as influential on the show "from the very beginning"; Ostertag originated a major plot twist in the show's penultimate season.

In July 2020, Stevenson announced that he was "nonbinary, or something like it", and that he used any gender pronouns. In November 2020, Stevenson published a comic about his top surgery. On March 31, 2021, the International Transgender Day of Visibility, Stevenson stated that he is transmasculine and bigender.

In August 2021, Stevenson changed his first name to ND, as noted by CBR, Out, ComicsBeat, Xtra Magazine, and Bleeding Cool. In October 2021, Stevenson said that he was "becoming increasingly aware of the practical need for a new, less gendered [name] ... right now I don't really feel like I have one". On June 30, 2022, Stevenson announced he had chosen the name Nate, which he had been using privately since 2021, while being addressed as "ND Stevenson" professionally. Stevenson stated that his pronouns are he/him and he accepts "Indy" as a nickname.

On October 11, 2020, National Coming Out Day, Stevenson wrote and illustrated his coming out story for Oprah Magazine. He described his journey to self-acceptance, his "battle against the gender essentialism of [his] Evangelical upbringing", and stated that he had become an atheist by age 23.

In an August 2020 interview, Stevenson stated that he has bipolar disorder. In a February 2021 interview, he mentioned having ADHD and its impact on his work and life during the COVID-19 pandemic.

== Bibliography ==
=== Graphic novels ===
- Nimona (HarperCollins, 2015)

=== Other fiction ===
- Scarlet Morning (HarperCollins, 2025)

=== Graphic non-fiction ===
- The Fire Never Goes Out: A Memoir in Pictures (HarperCollins, 2020)

=== BOOM! Studios ===
- "The Sweater Bandit" (in Adventure Time with Fionna & Cake #1, January 2013, collected in Volume 1: Mathemagical Edition, tpb, 160 pages, 2013)
- "Desert Treasure" ( in Adventure Time 2013 Summer Special, July 2013)
- Lumberjanes #1–17 (April 2014–August 2015)
  - Volume 1: Beware the Kitten Holy (collects #1–4, writer with Grace Ellis and Gus A. Allen, tpb, 128 pages, 2015)
  - Volume 2: Friendship to the Max (collects #5–8, writer with Grace Ellis and Gus A. Allen, tpb, 112 pages, 2015)
  - Volume 3: A Terrible Plan (collects #9–12, writer with Shannon Watters and Carolyn Nowak, tpb, 112 pages, 2016)
  - Volume 4: Out of Time (collects #14-17, writer with Shannon Watters and Gus A. Allen, tpb, 112 pages, 2016)
  - Volume 5: Band Together (includes #13, writer with Shannon Watters and Gus A. Allen, tpb, 116 pages, 2016)
- Sleepy Hollow 4 #1–4 (4-issue limited series, backup stories, November 2014–January 2015)
  - Sleepy Hollow: Volume 1 (tpb, 112 pages, 2015) collects:
    - "Movie Night" (in #1, 2014)
    - "At the Fair" (in #2, 4, 2014)
    - "Shopping" (in #3, 2015)

=== Marvel Comics ===
- Runaways vol. 4 #1–4 (4-issue limited series, August–November 2015)
  - Battleworld (tpb, 120 pages, 2015) collects:
    - "Doomed Youth" (writer with Sanford Greene, in #1–4, 2015)
- "Thor" (writer with Marguerite Sauvage, in Thor Annual #1, April 2015, collected in Volume 2: Who Holds the Hammer?, hc, 136 pages, 2015)

=== DC Comics ===
- "Wonder World" (artist with James Tynion IV, in Sensation Comics Featuring Wonder Woman #23–24, February 2015, collected in Volume 2, tpb, 144 pages, 2015)

== Filmography ==
=== Film ===
Title	Year	Credited as			Role	Notes
Title	Year	Writer	Producer	Actor	Role	Notes
Ron's Gone Wrong	2021	Yes	No	No		Additional Story Material
Nimona	2023	Yes	Co-producer	Yes	Kwispy Dwagon (voice)	Additional Screenplay Material "Based on" credit

=== Television ===
Title	Year	Credited as				Role	Notes
Title	Year	Writer	Executive Producer	Animation/Art department	Actor	Role	Notes
Bravest Warriors	2014	Yes (Note: Credited as Noelle Stevenson.)	No	No	No		
Wander Over Yonder	2015–2016	Yes	No	Yes	No		Background painter
Rapunzel's Tangled Adventure	2017	Yes	No	No	No		
Lego Star Wars: The Freemaker Adventures	2017	Yes	No	No	No		
DuckTales	2017	Yes	No	No	No		
Critical Role	2017–2022	—N/a (Note: Critical Role has no writers in the traditional sense as it is an actual play web series; it relies on improvisation and collaborative storytelling through Dungeons & Dragons and other role-playing game systems.)	No	No	Yes (Note: Initially credited as Noelle Stevenson until 2022.)	Himself, Tova, Peter Pan	Web series; 5 episodes
Big Hero 6: The Series	2018	Yes	No	No	No		
She-Ra and the Princesses of Power	2018–2020	Yes	Yes	No	Yes	Spinnerella (voice)	Creator; voice role in 8 episodes

=== Episodic writing credits ===
Title	Season	Episode		Name	Notes
Bravest Warriors	2	9		"The Dimension Garden"	
Wander Over Yonder	2				
Wander Over Yonder	2	2	a	"The Big Day"	Story only
Wander Over Yonder	2	4	b	"The Axe"	Story only
Wander Over Yonder	2	5	a	"The Loose Screw"	Story only
Wander Over Yonder	2	5	b	"The It"	Story only
Wander Over Yonder	2	6	a	"The Cool Guy"	Story only
Wander Over Yonder	2	6	b	"The Catastrophe"	
Wander Over Yonder	2	7	a	"The Rager"	Story only
Wander Over Yonder	2	7	b	"The Good Bad Guy"	Story only
Wander Over Yonder	2	8		"The Battle Royale"	Story only
Wander Over Yonder	2	9	a	"The Matchmaker"	Story only
Wander Over Yonder	2	9	b	"The New Toy"	Story only
Wander Over Yonder	2	10	a	"The Black Cube"	Story only
Wander Over Yonder	2	10	b	"The Eye on the Skullship"	Story only
Wander Over Yonder	2	11	a	"The Secret Planet"	
Wander Over Yonder	2	11	b	"The Bad Hatter"	Story only
Wander Over Yonder	2	12	a	"The Hole...Lotta Nuthin'"	Story only
Wander Over Yonder	2	12	b	The Show Stopper"	Story only
Wander Over Yonder	2	13	a	"The Cartoon"	Story only
Wander Over Yonder	2	13	b	"The Bot"	
Wander Over Yonder	2	14	a	"The Family Reunion"	Story only
Wander Over Yonder	2	14	b	"The Rival"	
Wander Over Yonder	2	15		"My Fair Hatey"	Story only
Wander Over Yonder	2	16	a	"The Legend"	Story only
Wander Over Yonder	2	16	b	"The Bad Neighbors"	Story only
Wander Over Yonder	2	17	a	"The Party Poopers"	Story only
Wander Over Yonder	2	17	b	"The Waste of Time"	Story only
Wander Over Yonder	2	18	a	"The Hot Shot"	Story only
Wander Over Yonder	2	18	b	"The Night Out"	
Wander Over Yonder	2	19	a	"The Search for Captain Tim"	Story only
Wander Over Yonder	2	19	b	"The Heebie Jeebies"	Story only
Wander Over Yonder	2	20	a	"The Sick Day"	
Wander Over Yonder	2	20	b	"The Sky Guy"	Story only
Wander Over Yonder	2	21	a	"The Robomechabotatron"	Story only
Wander Over Yonder	2	21	b	"The Flower"	Story only
Wander Over Yonder	2	22		"The End of the Galaxy"	Story only
Wander Over Yonder	Shorts	1		"The First Take"	
Wander Over Yonder	Shorts	2		"The Smile"	
Wander Over Yonder	Shorts	3		"The Killjoy"	
Wander Over Yonder	Shorts	4		"The Theme Song"	
Wander Over Yonder	Shorts	5		"The Bathroom Break"	
Wander Over Yonder	Shorts	6		"The Planetary Conqueror"	
Rapunzel's Tangled Adventure	1	2		"Rapunzel's Enemy"	Story only
Lego Star Wars: The Freemaker Adventures	2	4		"The Embersteel Blade"	
DuckTales	1	1		"Woo-oo!"	Story only
DuckTales	1	3		"The Impossible Summit of Mt. Neverrest!"	Story only
Big Hero 6: The Series	1	5		"Food Fight"	
She-Ra and the Princesses of Power	1	1		"The Sword" (Part 1)"	
She-Ra and the Princesses of Power	1	2		"The Sword" (Part 2)"	
She-Ra and the Princesses of Power	1	3		"Razz"	
She-Ra and the Princesses of Power	1	11		"Promise"	
She-Ra and the Princesses of Power	1	13		"The Battle of Bright Moon"	
She-Ra and the Princesses of Power	3	5		"Remember"	
She-Ra and the Princesses of Power	4	9		"Hero"	
She-Ra and the Princesses of Power	5	5		"Save the Cat"	
She-Ra and the Princesses of Power	5	13		"Heart" (Part 2)	

== Awards and nominations ==
Year	Organization	Award	Category	Work	Result	Ref.
2012	Center for Cartoon Studies / Slate	Cartoonist Studio Prize	Best Web Comic of the Year	Nimona	Won	
2015	SFWA	Nebula Award	Andre Norton Award for Young Adult Science Fiction and Fantasy	Nimona	Nominated	
2015	San Diego Comic-Con	Eisner Award	Best New Series	Lumberjanes	Won (Note: Shared with Shannon Watters, Grace Ellis, and Gus Allen)	
2015	San Diego Comic-Con	Eisner Award	Best Publication for Teens	Lumberjanes	Won	
2015	San Diego Comic-Con	Eisner Award	Best Digital/Webcomic	Nimona	Nominated	
2015	National Book Foundation	National Book Award	Young People's Literature	Nimona	Finalist	
2016	Harvey Awards Executive Committee	Harvey Award	Best Original Graphic Publication for Young Readers	Lumberjanes	Won (Note: Shared with Shannon Watters and Grace Ellis.)	
2016	GLAAD	GLAAD Media Award	Outstanding Comic Book	Lumberjanes	Won	
2016	San Diego Comic-Con	Eisner Award	Best Graphic Album: Reprint	Nimona	Won	
2022	Harvey Awards Executive Committee	Harvey Award	Digital Book of the Year	I'm Fine I'm Fine Just Understand	Nominated	
