= Nimona (film) =

2023 film by Nick Bruno and Troy Quane

- Promotional release poster
- Directed by: Nick Bruno; Troy Quane
- Screenplay by: Robert L. Baird; Lloyd Taylor
- Story by: Robert L. Baird; Lloyd Taylor; Pamela Ribon; Marc Haimes; Nick Bruno; Troy Quane; Keith Bunin
- Based on: Nimona by ND Stevenson
- Produced by: Karen Ryan; Julie Zackary; Roy Lee
- Starring: Chloë Grace Moretz; Riz Ahmed; Eugene Lee Yang; RuPaul Charles; Indya Moore; Julio Torres; Frances Conroy; Lorraine Toussaint
- Edited by: Randy Trager; Erin Crackel
- Music by: Christophe Beck
- Production companies: Annapurna Pictures; Blue Sky Studios (Note: The film was made at Blue Sky prior to the studio's closure, with their version of the film being mostly intact and the studio being credited in the film.)
- Distributed by: Netflix
- Release dates: June 14, 2023 (Annecy); June 23, 2023 (United States); June 30, 2023 (Netflix)
- Running time: 99 minutes
- Country: United States
- Language: English

Nimona is a 2023 American animated science fantasy action-adventure film directed by Nick Bruno and Troy Quane and written by Robert L. Baird and Lloyd Taylor, based on the 2015 graphic novel by ND Stevenson. Set in a medieval-futuristic kingdom, the film features the voices of Chloë Grace Moretz as the eponymous shapeshifting character and Riz Ahmed as her boss and former knight Ballister, with Eugene Lee Yang, RuPaul Charles, Indya Moore, Julio Torres, Frances Conroy, and Lorraine Toussaint voicing supporting roles. The story follows Ballister who, after he is framed for the murder of the Queen, teams up with Nimona on a mission to clear his name.

Originally a production of Blue Sky Studios, it was set to be directed by Patrick Osborne, with an initial release date of 2020. Following the Walt Disney Company's acquisition of 21st Century Fox, the parent company of Blue Sky, it was delayed a couple times before being canceled due to Blue Sky's closure in April 2021. However, Annapurna Pictures revived the project the following year, with Bruno and Quane announced as directors, DNEG Animation providing animation, and Netflix acquiring worldwide distribution. Christophe Beck was hired to compose the film's rock-inspired score.

Nimona had its world premiere at the Annecy International Animation Film Festival on June 14, 2023, was released in select theaters on June 23, and made its streaming debut on June 30. The film received critical acclaim and was nominated for Best Animated Feature at the Critics' Choice Awards, Annie Awards, and Academy Awards.

== Plot ==
The citizens of a medieval-futuristic kingdom are protected by the Institute for Elite Knights, established by the legendary heroine Gloreth, who vanquished a "Great Black Monster" and enclosed the kingdom with a high wall one thousand years ago.

Ballister Boldheart is the first commoner to become a knight, as Queen Valerin is trying to change tradition so that "anyone can be a hero". During the ceremony, a laser shot from Ballister's sword kills Valerin. Ballister's boyfriend and fellow knight, Ambrosius Goldenloin, becomes distraught and disarms Ballister, dismembering Ballister's right arm in the process. Ballister becomes a fugitive.

As Ballister crafts a prosthetic replacement arm, he is visited by Nimona, a teenage outcast who has faced persecution for her shapeshifting abilities. Seeing a "villainous spirit" in Ballister, as he is facing similar treatment for his commoner origin and the murder of the Queen, Nimona declares herself to be his sidekick.

To clear Ballister's name, the duo kidnaps Diego, the squire who gave Ballister the sword. Diego gives them video evidence of the Director of the Institute secretly swapping Ballister's sword, revealing her to be the murderer. The duo confronts Ambrosius and the Director with the evidence, but the Director manipulates her knights into destroying it. Later, the Director is confronted by Ambrosius; she admits that she framed Ballister and murdered Valerin, as she steadfastly believes that strictly adhering to tradition is the only way to keep the kingdom safe from monsters. However, Ballister reveals that he has recorded the Director's confession, and "Ambrosius" turns out to be Nimona in disguise. When celebrating this in the hideout, Ballister posts it online, leading to public outcry.

The Director discovers that Nimona is the Great Black Monster defeated by Gloreth. She uses this information to convince the kingdom's citizens that it was a shapeshifted monster that had confessed in the recording, and paranoia spreads that anyone could be a monster. The real Ambrosius meets with Ballister and reveals Nimona's past, insisting that Nimona deliberately deceived Ballister. Shocked by the revelation, Ballister argues with Nimona and questions their friendship. Feeling betrayed, Nimona flees into the woods.

Stopping at an abandoned well, Nimona reminisces about her past: a thousand years ago, she wandered the world and transformed into other animals to try and fit in with the wildlife, but none of the creatures she encountered accepted her. After encountering Gloreth, who was a child at the time, Nimona transformed into a human child. Gloreth and Nimona became friends, and Gloreth was accepting of Nimona's powers. However, the other citizens of Gloreth's village, including her parents, believed Nimona was a monster after discovering her abilities. The villagers attacked Nimona with torches, which accidentally set the village on fire. Gloreth, confused, became fearful of Nimona and drove her away.

With Ballister's abandonment and Gloreth's betrayal echoing in her head, Nimona transforms into the Great Black Monster. She enters the city and decides to commit suicide by impaling herself on the sword of Gloreth's statue. However, before she can do so, Ballister stops her and apologizes. Nimona changes back to human form and embraces Ballister. The kingdom's citizens see this and are moved by it, but the Director orders a massive laser cannon on the wall to be fired at Nimona. Ambrosius protests at turning the weapon on the city, which would cause widespread destruction and countless deaths. The Director then turns on the knights, using the same kind of beam that killed the Queen, and prepares to fire the cannon herself. To save the kingdom, Nimona assumes a giant, red phoenix-like form and flies into the cannon, resulting in both of their apparent deaths. The resulting explosion destroys part of the wall, revealing a beautiful, mountainous valley behind it.

Sometime later, the kingdom undergoes several changes: the breach in the wall has become a passageway through which citizens travel freely; Nimona and Ballister are honored as heroes; and Ballister's relationship with Ambrosius has been restored. Ballister visits his old hideout when he hears Nimona's voice, and joyfully realizes that she has survived, swearing as the credits kick in.

== Voice cast ==
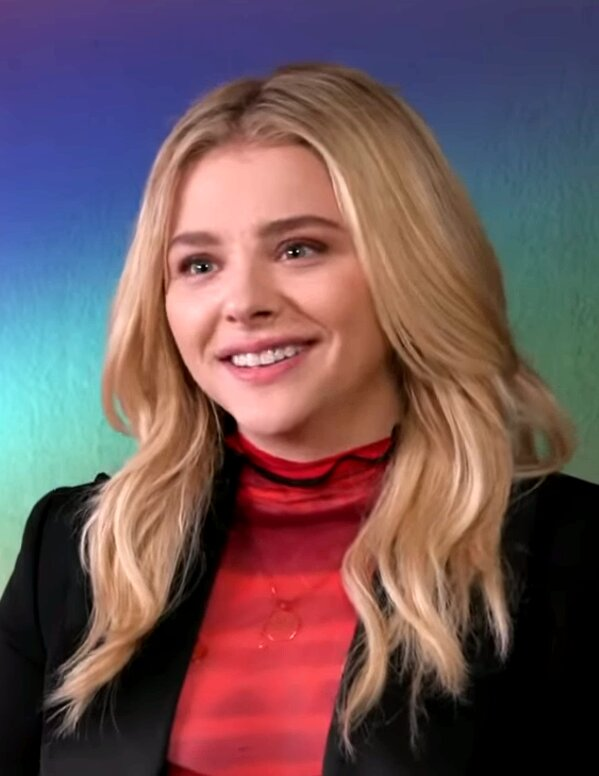
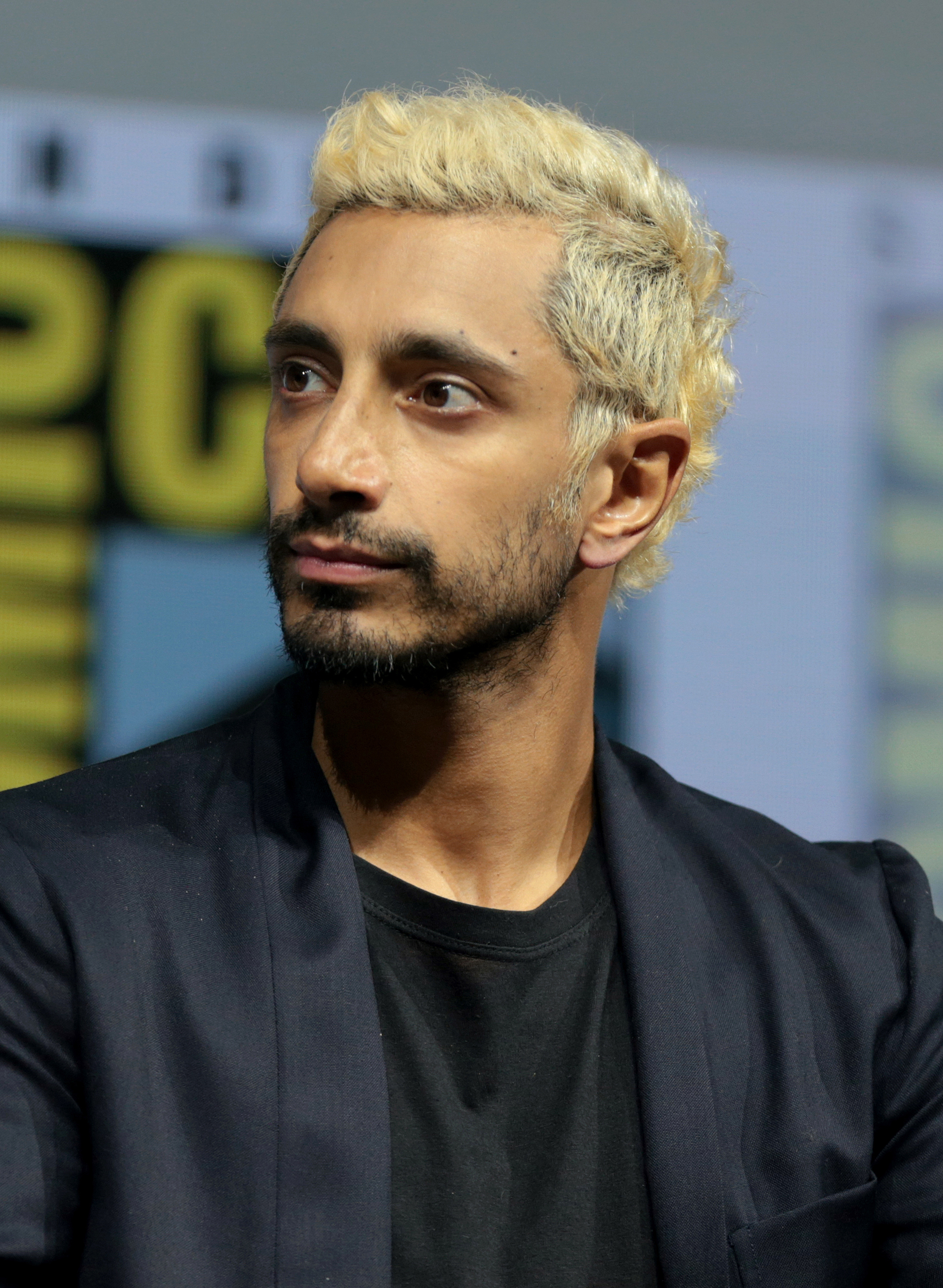
Chloë Grace Moretz and Riz Ahmed voiced Nimona and Ballister Boldheart respectively.
- Chloë Grace Moretz as Nimona, a shapeshifter who takes the appearance of a teenage girl. She insists on being the sidekick to Ballister Boldheart.
  - Mia Collins voices Nimona's Demon Baby disguise.
- Riz Ahmed as Ballister Boldheart, a former knight for the Institution who was kicked out when he was accused of murdering Queen Valerin.
  - Zayaan Kunwar as young Ballister
- Eugene Lee Yang as Ambrosius Goldenloin, the champion knight of the Institution, direct descendant of Gloreth, and Ballister's boyfriend.
- Frances Conroy as the Director
- Lorraine Toussaint as Queen Valerin
- Beck Bennett as Sir Thoddeus "Todd" Sureblade
- RuPaul Charles as Nate Knight
- Indya Moore as Alamzapam Davis
- Julio Torres as Diego the Squire
- Sarah Sherman as Coriander Cavaverish
- Karen Ryan as Gloreth. Ryan also voices a knight version of herself, as well as providing additional voices.
  - Charlotte Aldrich as young Gloreth. Aldrich also provides additional voices.
- Cindy Slattery as Syntheya - voice of the Kingdom. Slattery also provides additional voices.
- Sommersill Tarabek as an Institute Analyst. Tarabek also provides additional voices.
- Lylianna Eugene as Patience. Eugene also provides additional voices.

Other members of the production crew who voice knight versions of themselves include directors Nick Bruno and Troy Quane, Julie Zackary, Christopher Campbell, and Randy Trager; Bruno, Quane, Zackary, and Trager also provide additional voices, alongside Wesley Turner. Bruno's sons, Jarrett (who voiced young Walter Beckett from Bruno and Quane's Spies in Disguise) and Jake, voice the kids who play a board game in a commercial as well as provide additional voices, and Taryn Bruno voices a concerned citizen; Trager's relative Sadie also voices a concerned citizen, while Sebastian Trager voices the Danks Kid. Maurissa Horwitz—who also provides additional voices—and former Blue Sky editor Tim Nordquist voice the zombies in a movie Nimona and Ballister watch.

Nimona creator ND Stevenson, who also served as a co-producer and contributed additional screenplay material for the film, has a voice cameo as Kwispy Dwagon, a cartoon cereal mascot.

== Production ==
=== Development ===
==== Blue Sky Studios ====
Original logo for the film when it was produced by Blue Sky Studios.

In June 2015, 20th Century Fox Animation acquired the rights for an animated feature film adaptation of Nimona, a webcomic by ND Stevenson. Patrick Osborne was set to direct, from a screenplay by Marc Haimes.

The film was to be produced by Fox's former subsidiary, Blue Sky Studios, alongside Vertigo Entertainment. In June 2017, 20th Century Fox scheduled Nimona to be released on February 14, 2020.

In March 2019, The Walt Disney Company completed its acquisition of Fox, then in May 2019, the film was delayed to March 5, 2021. In November 2019, the film was delayed again to January 14, 2022. Through 2020 there was word that the film would be released in 2022, Stevenson stated in June 2020 that the film was still happening, and said the same in an August 2020 podcast. In August of that same year, Den of Geek reported that the animated film was still scheduled to be released in 2022, but gave no further details, with Deadline reporting the same in October.

Osborne would depart the film by March 2020, and after his departure, Nick Bruno and Troy Quane were brought on in to work on the story after directing Blue Sky's previous film Spies in Disguise (2019). Production would be done remotely during the COVID-19 pandemic.

==== Cancellation and aftermath ====
On February 9, 2021, Disney announced it was closing down Blue Sky Studios, and that production of the film was cancelled. Following the announcement, Stevenson said it was a "sad day" and that he wished the best for everyone who worked at Blue Sky Studios, while Osborne said he was "truly heartbroken" that the studio was closing its doors. Webcomics commenter Gary Tyrrell criticized the decision, saying, "Disney could have allowed a very different kind of young heroine... I mourn for those who would have found a vision of themselves in an animated version". Anonymous staffers at Blue Sky interviewed by Business Insider bemoaned the cancellation of the film, calling it "heartbreaking", arguing that the film "didn't look like anything else in the animated world", and saying that they believe it will never "be completed and released." The film was set to be the first use of Blue Sky's Conduit, a system that allowed artists to "find, track, version, and quality control their work." Had it been made, it would have been Blue Sky's first film with LGBTQ representation, as a few staffers confirmed to BuzzFeed News that the film had an "I love you" scene between Ballister Blackheart and Ambrosius Goldenloin.

One staffer stated that before being canceled, the film was "on track" to being finished by October 2021. A former animator at Blue Sky, Rich Fournier, stated that the studio was "very very close" to getting the film finished, but that they "found out it simply was not doable".

In March 2021, it was reported that Chloë Grace Moretz and Riz Ahmed were to have voiced Nimona and Ballister Blackheart, respectively, and that the film was being shopped around to other studios to be completed. In June 2021, Mey Rude, a writer for Out, said she still held out "hope that this film ... will find its way back to life somehow."

In March 2022, amid the controversy of Disney's involvement in Florida's Parental Rights in Education bill and lack of criticism from CEO Bob Chapek until after the bill had passed, three former Blue Sky staff members stated the film received pushback from Disney leadership, centered around the film's LGBTQ themes and a same-sex kiss.

==== Revival by Annapurna and Netflix ====
On April 11, 2022, it was announced that Annapurna Pictures and Netflix had picked up Nimona earlier in the year, and would be releasing on its streaming service in 2023. DNEG Animation was announced as the project's animation partner. The voice cast was also retained, with the addition of Eugene Lee Yang as Ambrosius Goldenloin announced at this point. Bruno and Quane were officially announced as replacements for Osborne as the new directors of the film; Bruno and Quane were heavily involved in the film prior to Blue Sky's shutdown, acting as directors, according to a Blue Sky staffer. Roy Lee, Karen Ryan, and Julie Zackary were reported as producers on the feature. Annapurna CEO Megan Ellison said that one aspect that she particularly liked were the LGBTQ elements, stating that as a lesbian "I needed this movie when I was a kid, and quite frankly, I needed it right then and there", and encouraged the filmmakers to embrace them, in contrast to Disney wanting to tone down the queer characters.

In December 2022, it emerged that the film would serve as the first release of Annapurna's new division, Annapurna Animation. On April 24, 2023, Frances Conroy, Lorraine Toussaint, Beck Bennett, RuPaul Charles, Indya Moore, Julio Torres, and Sarah Sherman were announced as part of the cast.

=== Animation and design ===
Nimona was Blue Sky's most complex film produced. The studio had previous experience with 2D-stylization with The Peanuts Movie (2015). The film's design was influenced by Eyvind Earle and Charley Harper, using both of their styles to combine medieval and the modern world so that it "mirrored the world we live in." The team chose their styles as Earle used more fluidity and Harper used a more geometric and simple shape base, and they had to convey "both sides of the spectrum and both sides of the character ideologies." They also had to incorporate the novel's style as well, including circles for the free-form Nimona, squares for the traditionalist Ballister, and diamonds for the rigid Institute. "In the case of the pink-colored Nimona, her shape-shifting (rhino, whale, cat, gorilla) translated into an explosion of emotions." Aidan Sugano serves as production designer on the film, and described it as having elements of "sci-fi, medieval fantasy, knights, lasers, monsters, dragons, dramatic lighting, [and]... style". Additionally, Goldenloin's ethnicity was changed to be Asian and Ballister's last name was changed from Blackheart to Boldheart, and they were both modeled after Lee Yang and Ahmed respectively.

At the time of its initial cancellation, sources told Comic Book Resources that the film was "75% complete". Quane later clarified that the film was approximately "70% through layout": they had completed five fully animated sequences, along with character models, story reels, and locations at the time of Blue Sky's shutdown. The finished footage was shown to various people in the animation business, and convinced Megan Ellison at Annapurna Pictures to complete the project. Much of what Blue Sky did remains intact, as Netflix and Annapurna did not start from scratch. However, when DNEG's facilities in Montreal took over animation, different pipelines had to be built from scratch, including switching render engines from Blue Sky's proprietary render engine, CGI Studio, to Pixar RenderMan, but fortunately, the team had a blueprint from Blue Sky, and they were able to translate it and apply it with DNEG's technology. Storywise, about 90% of Blue Sky's version remained intact. As a tribute to the previous team's work on the film, a section of the end credits is dedicated to listing the entire staff of Blue Sky Studios, and several Easter eggs pay homage to Blue Sky throughout the film. Animation wrapped on October 1, 2022.

=== Music ===
In May 2023, it was confirmed that Christophe Beck had composed the film's score. American singer and rapper K.Flay performed the original song "T-Rex" as part of the single music in the film's soundtrack and released on June 23, the same day as the film's limited release date. The film's score album was released on June 30 by Netflix Music.

== Release ==
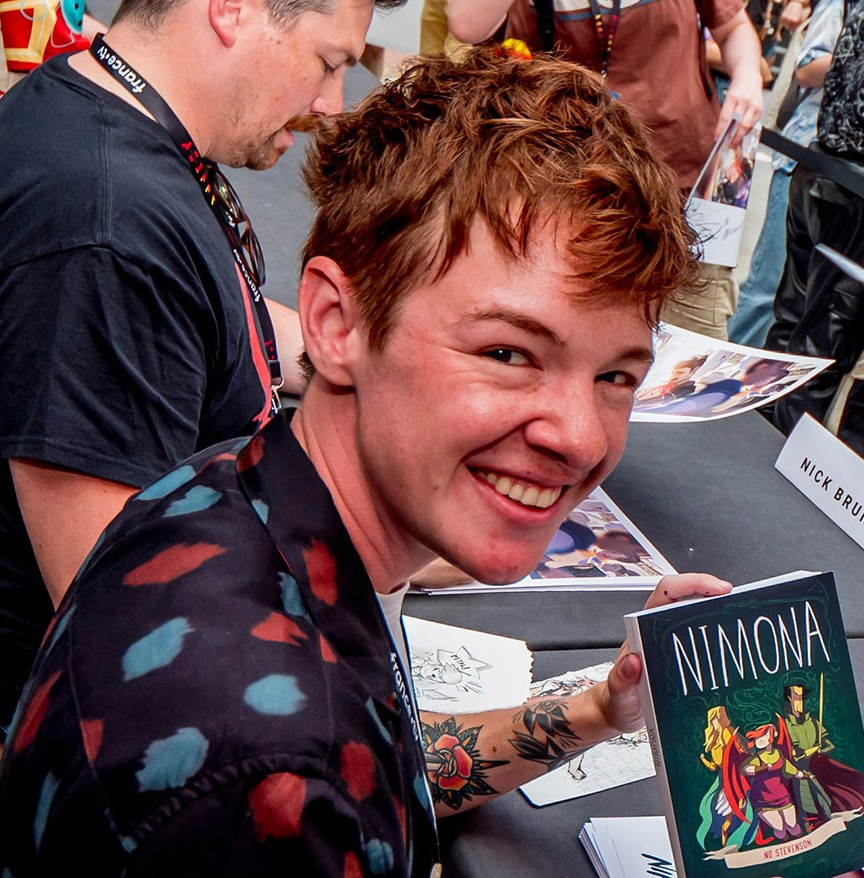
Nimona creator ND Stevenson at the 2023 Annecy International Animation Film Festival

Nimona was originally scheduled to be released in theaters on February 14, 2020, by Walt Disney Studios Motion Pictures through their 20th Century Studios banner, but it was delayed multiple times to March 5, 2021, and then for January 14, 2022. The film was pulled from Disney's release schedule and canceled after the closure of Blue Sky Studios on April 10, 2021. It was revived by Annapurna Pictures with Netflix handling the distribution and was scheduled for a summer 2023 release. The movie premiered at the Annecy International Animation Film Festival on June 14, 2023. The film received early screenings at select theaters on June 23 and 24, and released digitally on Netflix on June 30.

On February 19, 2024, Netflix released the entire film onto YouTube, and the video was privated after a week.

== Reception ==
=== Critical response ===
The film received critical acclaim. (Note: Multiple references:) On the review aggregator website Rotten Tomatoes, 92% of 103 critics' reviews are positive, with an average rating of 7.9/10. The website's consensus reads: "Tapping a rich emotional vein with its splendid animation and thoughtful allegory, Nimona is a deeply lovable animated adventure." Metacritic, which uses a weighted average, assigned the film a score of 75 out of 100, based on 17 critics, indicating "generally favorable" reviews.

Reviewing the film following its premiere at Annecy for Variety, Peter Debruge called Nimona "such subversive fun", praising the "hip and impulsive" character of Nimona, "outside-the-box" animation, LGBTQ themes and vocal performances—particularly that of Moretz, which he remarked as a "delicious sense of anarchy". Ben Travis of Empire compared the film to Shrek (2001) in their "satirical subversions of the fairytale formula" and wrote: "Both enthusiastically irreverent and deeply sincere, Nimona is a revisionist fairytale that forges its own path visually and narratively to beautiful effect". In The Hollywood Reporter, Frank Scheck called it "a consistent delight" and commended the screenplay, direction, animation, score, and lead performances.

In Screen International, Wendy Ide called it a "slick, enjoyable package" with "a couple of distinctive selling points that should set it apart" and opined: "Whether or not they understand the film's subtext, younger audiences will no doubt relish the exuberant mischief and humour that Moretz brings to her voice performance—as well as Nimona's gleeful disregard for authority and her appetite for destruction". Peter Bradshaw of The Guardian gave the film a score of 3 out of 5 stars and concluded: "Nimona is likable and engaging entertainment that finds its way through self-created chaos to some humane life-lessons". Associated Press critic Lindsay Bahr called it a "fantasy adventure with riot grrrl energy" and praised the animation, soundtrack and lead performances.

=== Accolades ===
Award	Date of ceremony	Category	Recipient(s)	Result	Ref.
Washington D.C. Area Film Critics Association Awards	December 10, 2023	Best Animated Film	Nimona	Nominated	
Indiana Film Journalists Association	December 17, 2023	Best Animated Film	Nimona	Nominated	
Indiana Film Journalists Association	December 17, 2023	Best Vocal/Motion-Capture Performance	Chloë Grace Moretz	Nominated	
Women Film Critics Circle Awards	December 18, 2023	Best Animated Female	Chloë Grace Moretz	2nd Runner-up (Note: Shared with Leah Lewis for Elemental (2023))	
San Diego Film Critics Society	December 19, 2023	Best Animated Film	Nimona	Nominated	
Alliance of Women Film Journalists	January 3, 2024	Best Animated Film	Nimona	Nominated	
Alliance of Women Film Journalists	January 3, 2024	Best Animated Female	Chloë Grace Moretz	Nominated	
Columbus Film Critics Association	January 4, 2024	Best Animated Film	Nimona	Won	
Astra Film Awards	January 6, 2024	Best Animated Feature	Nimona	Nominated	
Seattle Film Critics Society Awards	January 8, 2024	Best Animated Feature	Nimona	Nominated	
San Francisco Bay Area Film Critics Circle Awards	January 9, 2024	Best Animated Feature	Nimona	Nominated	
Austin Film Critics Association Awards	January 10, 2024	Best Voice Acting/Animated/Digital Performance	Chloë Grace Moretz	Nominated	
Critics' Choice Movie Awards	January 14, 2024	Best Animated Feature	Nimona	Nominated	
Houston Film Critics Society	January 22, 2024	Best Animated Feature	Nimona	Nominated	
Online Film Critics Society Awards	January 22, 2024	Best Animated Feature	Nimona	Nominated	
Annie Awards	February 17, 2024	Best Animated Feature	Nimona	Nominated	
Annie Awards	February 17, 2024	Outstanding Achievement for Directing in a Feature Production	Nick Bruno, Troy Quane	Nominated	
Annie Awards	February 17, 2024	Outstanding Achievement for Storyboarding in a Feature Production	Esteban Bravo	Nominated	
Annie Awards	February 17, 2024	Outstanding Achievement for Writing in a Feature Production	Robert L. Baird, Lloyd Taylor	Won	
Annie Awards	February 17, 2024	Outstanding Achievement for Character Animation in a Feature Production	Toby Seale	Nominated	
Annie Awards	February 17, 2024	Outstanding Achievement for Character Design in a Feature Production	Aidan Sugano	Nominated	
Annie Awards	February 17, 2024	Outstanding Achievement for Production Design in an Animated Feature Production	Aidan Sugano, Jeff Turley	Nominated	
Annie Awards	February 17, 2024	Outstanding Achievement for Editorial in a Feature Production	Randy Trager, Erin Crackel, Stephen Schwartz, Ashley Calle	Nominated	
Annie Awards	February 17, 2024	Outstanding Achievement for Voice Acting in a Feature Production	Chloë Grace Moretz	Won	
Visual Effects Society Awards	February 21, 2024	Outstanding Visual Effects in an Animated Feature	Archie Donato, Yancy Lindquist, Theodore Ty, Anthony Kemp	Nominated	
American Cinema Editors	March 3, 2024	Best Edited Animated Feature Film (Theatrical or Non-Theatrical)	Randy Trager and Erin Crackel	Nominated	
Academy Awards	March 10, 2024	Best Animated Feature	Nick Bruno, Troy Quane, Karen Ryan and Julie Zackary	Nominated	
GLAAD Media Awards	March 14, 2024	Outstanding Kids and Family Programming - Animated	Nimona	Nominated	
Critics' Choice Super Awards	April 4, 2024	Best Superhero Movie	Nimona	Nominated	
Critics' Choice Super Awards	April 4, 2024	Best Actress in a Superhero Movie	Chloë Grace Moretz	Nominated	
Ursa Major Awards	April 7, 2024	Best Anthropomorphic Motion Picture	Nimona	Won	
Hugo Awards	August 11, 2024	Best Dramatic Presentation (Long Form)	Robert L. Baird, Lloyd Taylor, Nick Bruno, and Troy Quane	Nominated	

== Future ==
In February 2024, Quane expressed interest in making sequels and spin-offs. In September 2025, Stevenson revealed, "There is a pitch I'm very excited about," in regards to a sequel, adding that "the conversation is far from dead."
