= Wander Over Yonder =

American animated television series

- Genre: Science fiction comedy; Adventure
- Created by: Craig McCracken
- Voices of: Jack McBrayer; April Winchell; Keith Ferguson; Tom Kenny
- Theme music composer: Two Man Gentlemen Band
- Opening theme: "Wander Over Yonder Main Title"
- Composer: Andy Bean
- Country of origin: United States
- Original language: English
- No. of seasons: 2
- No. of episodes: 43 (79 segments) (list of episodes)

Production
- Executive producer: Craig McCracken
- Animators: Mercury Filmworks (season 1); Boulder Media Limited (season 2)
- Running time: 22 minutes (11 minutes per segment)
- Production company: Disney Television Animation

Original release
- Network: Disney Channel; Disney XD
- Release: August 16, 2013 – June 27, 2016

Wander Over Yonder is an American animated television series created by Craig McCracken and produced by Disney Television Animation for Disney Channel and Disney XD. It follows the adventures of Wander, an optimistic nomad who travels across the galaxy and helps the inhabitants of various planets live freely despite the intentions of the evil Lord Hater to rule the universe.

The series premiered on Disney Channel on August 16, 2013. New episodes were moved during its first season to Disney XD on March 31, 2014, while episodes still did air on Disney Channel until October 4, 2014. The series ran for two seasons with the final episode airing June 27, 2016.

== Plot ==
The series follows Wander, a nomadic, helpful, and overly-optimistic intergalactic traveler and his best friend and steed, Sylvia the Zbornak, as they travel from planet to planet helping people to have fun, play, and live free, despite the continuing encroachment of Lord Hater, one of the most powerful villains in the galaxy, and his army of Watchdogs.

The show's first season is episodic; there are very few strong ties between episodes, and they can be viewed independently of each other. In the second season, however, a more sequential story is introduced; as Lord Dominator begins to conquer the galaxy, the show's tone becomes more serious and the focus moves from stopping the rather incompetent Lord Hater to stopping the extremely competent Lord Dominator. As a result, the episodes are more closely linked and there are several developments in the overarching plot.

== Episodes ==
Season	Segments	Episodes		Originally released		
Season	Segments	Episodes		First released	Last released	Network
1	14	21 (Note: 39 segments total)	8	August 16, 2013	January 24, 2014	Disney Channel
1	25	21	13	March 31, 2014	December 4, 2014	Disney XD
Shorts	N/A	11		July 20, 2015	August 3, 2015	Disney XD
2	40	22		August 3, 2015	June 27, 2016	Disney XD

== Characters ==
=== Main ===
- Wander (voiced by Jack McBrayer) is a optimistic, goodhearted, outgoing, energetic, and nomadic traveller who is occasionally annoying to the more levelheaded people around him. He aspires to explore different worlds and help people have fun and live free, in opposition to the evil reign of Lord Hater and his army of Watchdogs. Given his positive attitude and beliefs, Wander is often oblivious and inattentive to danger and will throw himself into dangerous situations without thinking things through properly. Wander is a short, furry, orange-skinned alien of an indeterminate species called Star Nomad. The inside of his hat acts as a portal that provides him with whatever he needs (although not necessarily what he wants). The episode "The Waste of Time" reveals that Wander has gone by at least one different name, such as Tumbleweed, and that he took the name Wander after being called a "wandering weirdo" by Sylvia.
- Sylvia (voiced by April Winchell) is Wander's horse-like steed and best friend, who explores and travels the universe with him. She acts as Wander's protector and is always there to help him when he inevitably puts himself in dangerous circumstances. She enjoys fighting, and though her rough nature can cause her to come off as ill-tempered, quarrelsome, inconsiderate, and reckless at times, she also has a softer side. The episode "The Waste of Time" reveals that Sylvia was once a bounty hunter who tried turning Wander in for money, but he eventually wore her down and she dropped her criminal ways in favor of traveling with him.
- Lord Hater (voiced by Keith Ferguson) is a skeleton with electrical powers who is the ruler of the Hater Empire and Wander's self-proclaimed nemesis. He is a power-hungry, evil, and cruel tyrant, while at the same time being a childish, petty, temperamental, and emotionally unstable egotist. He often does things based on emotion, which leads him to act irrationally.
- Commander Peepers (voiced by Tom Kenny) is a Watchdog and Lord Hater's right-hand. He is far more intelligent, focused, and disciplined than Lord Hater, though he has a tendency to underestimate Wander's capacity to foil their schemes. He acts as Lord Hater's strategist, usually making all of their plans and leading the Watchdogs into battle.
  - The Watchdogs (various voices) are small eyeball-headed aliens that serve as Lord Hater's minions and the bulk of his army. They are loyal to their master, but are frequently distracted by Wander's interference, particularly as their "enemy" treats them better than their ruler.

=== Recurring ===
- Captain Tim (voiced by Fred Tatasciore) is an Arachnomorph, a vicious spider-like alien who was found by Wander and Sylvia in a derelict ship and given to Lord Hater as a pet. He was named by Wander after the ship's captain, who Tim killed and ate.
- Emperor Awesome (voiced by Sam Riegel) is a flamboyant, party-loving, shark-headed alien and one of Lord Hater's greatest rivals in universal conquest.
  - The Fist Fighters are the fist-headed minions of Emperor Awesome.
- Lord Dominator (voiced by Fred Tatasciore masked and Noël Wells unmasked) is a powerful, fearsome, green-skinned female alien and Lord Hater's arch-rival as the "Greatest in the Galaxy" in the second season, who wears a suit of armor with lava and later ice-based abilities and commands a large robot army.
  - The Dominator-Bots are magma-based, orb-shaped robots that serve as Lord Dominator's foot soldiers.

== Development and broadcast ==
Craig McCracken, creator of Wander Over Yonder, previously helmed the Cartoon Network series The Powerpuff Girls and Foster's Home for Imaginary Friends. Wander Over Yonder is McCracken's first and only foray on a Disney-owned network. McCracken's wife Lauren Faust served as co-producer and story editor for the first season. The eponymous character made his debut on sketchbooks, clothes, and patches that McCracken sold at conventions, as well as in a never-finished graphic novel. McCracken described Wander as a "nomadic, hippie, muppet man". He also said that his approach to each episode was character-driven and that the show's use of color is influenced by Hanna-Barbera, where he used to work.

The series made its formal premiere on the Disney Channel on September 13, 2013. A sneak peek was screened at the 2012 San Diego Comic-Con. An early preview of the first episode, "The Picnic", was aired on the network on August 16, 2013, following the premiere of Phineas and Ferb: Mission Marvel.

Premieres of new episodes were moved to sister network Disney XD during its first season, on March 31, 2014. Shortly after, Disney Television Animation executive Eric Coleman announced that the series was renewed for a second season, with comic book writer ND Stevenson joining the writing team. This season premiered on August 3, 2015, with "The Greater Hater", a special half-hour episode. A set of 11 one-minute shorts were produced in promotion of this season premiere; the network released them starting in July.

Internationally, Wander Over Yonder made its premiere on Family Channel in Canada on October 13, 2013, on Disney XD in Australia on June 9, 2014, on Disney Channel in Israel on September 1, 2014, and on Disney XD in the UK and Ireland on March 10, 2014.

== Reception ==
The previewed episode was seen by roughly 2.9 million viewers.

The series received generally positive reviews.

The A.V. Club's Kevin McFarland wrote that the series continues the "zany legacy" of the Cartoon Network's "golden age" on a competing network. Emily Ashby of Common Sense Media describes the series as flash and funny, stating it would "appeal to kids." She also argued it is a series that "generates laughs in opposing personalities, nonstop action, and silly scenarios."

== Awards and nominations ==
Year	Award	Category	Nominee	Result
2014	41st Annie Awards	Outstanding Achievement, Character Design in an Animated TV/Broadcast Production	Craig McCracken	Nominated
2014	41st Annie Awards	Outstanding Achievement, Music in an Animated TV/Broadcast Production	Andy Bean	Nominated
2015	42nd Annie Awards	Best Animated TV/Broadcast Production For Children's Audience	Wander Over Yonder	Nominated
2015	42nd Annie Awards	Outstanding Achievement, Character Animation in an Animated Television/Broadcast Production	Justin Nichols	Won
2015	42nd Annie Awards	Outstanding Achievement, Character Design in an Animated TV/Broadcast Production	Benjamin Balistreri	Won
2015	42nd Annie Awards	Outstanding Achievement, Directing in an Animated TV/Broadcast Production	Dave Thomas	Nominated
2015	42nd Annie Awards	Outstanding Achievement, Production Design in an Animated TV/Broadcast Production	Alex Kirwan, Chris Tsirigotis, Alexander Duckworth, Janice Kubo & Francis Giglio	Nominated
2015	42nd Annie Awards	Outstanding Achievement, Storyboarding in an Animated TV/Broadcast Production	Mark Ackland	Nominated
2015	67th Primetime Emmy Awards	Outstanding Short-Format Animated Programming	Craig McCracken, Francisco Agones, Amy Higgins, Lauren Faust, Ben Joseph, Johanna Stein, Dave Thomas, Eddie Trigueros (for "The Gift 2: The Giftening")	Nominated
2016	43rd Annie Awards	Best Animated TV/Broadcast Production For Children's Audience	"The Breakfast"	Won
2016	43rd Annie Awards	Outstanding Achievement, Character Animation in an Animated Television/Broadcast Production	Justin Nichols (for "The Good Bad Guy")	Nominated
2016	43rd Annie Awards	Outstanding Achievement, Music in an Animated TV/Broadcast Production	Andy Bean (for "The Black Cube")	Nominated
2016	43rd Annie Awards	Outstanding Achievement, Storyboarding in an Animated TV/Broadcast Production	Justin Nichols (for "The Breakfast")	Nominated
2017	44th Annie Awards	Best Animated Television/Broadcast Production For Children	"My Fair Hatey"	Nominated
2017	44th Annie Awards	Outstanding Achievement, Directing in an Animated TV/Broadcast Production	Dave Thomas, Eddie Trigueros, and Justin Nichols (for "My Fair Hatey")	Nominated
2017	44th Annie Awards	Outstanding Achievement, Character Design in an Animated TV/Broadcast Production	Benjamin Balistreri (for "The Night Out")	Nominated
2017	69th Primetime Creative Arts Emmy Awards	Outstanding Individual Achievement in Animation	Justin Nichols (for "The End of the Galaxy")	Won
