= Egg Island =

Egg Island may refer to the following places:

In Australia:

- Egg Island, Horseshoe Reef, Tasmania
- Egg Islands, Huon River, Tasmania

In The Bahamas:

- Egg Island (Bahamas)

In Canada:

- Egg Island (Manitoba), an island on the northeastern coast of the province Manitoba
- Egg Island Ecological Reserve, an ecological reserve in Lake Athabasca, Alberta

In the United States:

- Egg Island (Alaska), an island in the Fox Islands subgroup of the Aleutian Islands
- Egg Island (Georgia)

In Antarctica:

- Egg Island (Antarctica)

In fiction:

- Egg Island (Yoshi), the setting of the video game Yoshi's New Island

== See also ==
- Eigg
