= The Egg and I (disambiguation) =

The Egg and I is a humorous memoir written by Betty MacDonald.

The Egg and I may also refer to:

- The Egg and I (film), a 1947 film based on the book
- The Egg and I, a 1951–52 CBS daytime TV serial starring Betty Lynn and John Craven
- "The Egg and I" (Married... with Children episode), the 17th episode of season six of the television sitcom Married... with Children
- "The Egg and I", a song on the soundtrack Cowboy Bebop (album)

== See also ==
- The Egg (disambiguation)
