= Scarlet Morning =

2025 novel by ND Stevenson

- Author: ND Stevenson
- Language: English
- Genre: Middle grade novel
- Publisher: Quill Tree Books
- Publication date: September 23, 2025
- Publication place: United States
- Pages: 432
- ISBN: 978-0-06-321034-9

Scarlet Morning is a middle grade novel written and illustrated by ND Stevenson. Published in September 23, 2025, by HarperCollins' imprint Quill Tree Books, it focuses on two orphans, Viola and Wilmur, who grow up reading stories about the sea and the pirates that sailed it, both of which disappeared after a calamitous event a long time ago. During interviews promoting the book, the author commented that it would be the first book of a duology.

== Background ==
In a 2023 interview with the website TheGamer, ND Stevenson commented he was working on a new series composed of two books based on a 600-page draft he had first written when he was between 12 and 15 years old. Talking to Publishers Weekly, Stevenson also commented how the main characters of the book were first created while playing a narrative game with his friends while he was 12 years old. He returned to the draft in 2020, after finishing his work as the showrunner of the series She-Ra and the Princesses of Power. Experiencing burnout and unable to leave his home due to the COVID-19 pandemic, he decided to spend some time reading his original story and improving it. On February 18, 2025, Stevenson announced the book would be released on September of the same year.

Stevenson said he was inspired by Douglas Adams' stories as well as the Monster Blood Tattoo series while writing the initial draft during his teenage years. The author also said that, while reworking on the story as an adult, the 2010 movie True Grit served as inspiration for the relationship between the orphans and the pirate captain they join.

== Reception ==
Stevenson's novel received positive reviews by several specialized publications, including Kirkus Reviews, Publishers Weekly and The Booklist. Kirkus and The Booklist praised the author's worldbuilding, noting this was Stevenson's first foray on a prose-focused novel. Writing for the School Library Journal, Kristin Brynsvold also praised the characters created by the writer, saying the novel offers "complicated heroes and villains". Publishers Weekly called attention to the illustrations that accompany the story, saying they "heighten the surrealist atmosphere of the vividly rendered fantasy setting."

== Sequel ==
While promoting Scarlet Morning, Stevenson noted he planned for the book to be part of a duology, with the second book featuring a different setting. It will be called Evening Gray, and will be published in September of 2027. Stevenson also noted that the two books will be part of a trilogy.

== Film adaptation ==
On November 2, 2026, it was announced that Amazon MGM Studios and Vertigo Entertainment are developing a film adaptation of the novel, with Kate Herron at the helm to direct, produce, and co-write the script with Kari Granlund. Roy Lee will produce alongside Herron through his company with Darlene Caamaño Loquet from Oh, My Darlin' Entertainment and Aubery Davis from Herron's banner company A Bag of Rats while Garnlund and Jakob Pollack serve as executive producers.
