= The Lost Egg =

The Lost Egg may refer to several television episodes:

- "The Lost Egg" (Ben & Holly's Little Kingdom), 2009
- "The Lost Egg" (Bonding), 2021
- "The Lost Egg" (The Cat in the Hat Knows a Lot About That!), 2010
- "The Lost Egg" (Gigantosaurus), 2019
- "The Lost Egg", an episode of Soup, 2002

== See also ==
- The Egg (disambiguation)
