= Egged =

Egged may refer to:

- Egged (company) or Egged Israel Transport Cooperative Society Ltd
  - Egged Ta'avura, an Israeli bus company, previously owned by Egged and by Taavura
- Egged, a verb form of egging, being pelted with eggs
- Operation Egged, an Israeli military operation
