= Golden Egg (disambiguation) =

"The Goose that Laid the Golden Eggs" is one of the best known Aesop's Fables

Golden Egg or Golden Eggs may also refer to:

== Business ==
- The Golden Egg (restaurant), UK chain founded in 1958, now defunct

== Fictional entities ==
- A golden egg, the main object of the Russian folk tale "Kurochka Ryaba" ("Ryaba the Hen")

== Games ==
- Golden Eggs, an hidden item that unlocks a bonus levels in Angry Birds
- Golden egg, a microtransaction in the Wii U game Devil's Third by Nintendo

== Literature ==
- The Golden Egg (1984), a novel by Dutch author Tim Krabbé
- The Golden Egg (2013), the 22nd book in Donna Leon's Commissario Guido Brunetti series of crime novels

== Music ==
- Golden Eggs, a bootleg album by the 1960s English group The Yardbirds
- "The Golden Egg", a song by the American indie band Quasi, from the album Field Studies (1999)

== Film ==
- Golden Eggs, a 1941 Donald Duck cartoon

== Television ==
- "The Golden Eggs", a 1963 episode of the British spy-fi television series The Avengers
- The World of Golden Eggs, a 2005 Japanese anime television series

== Sports ==
- Golden egg, the trophy in the Egg Bowl also known as the "Battle for the Golden Egg"
