= List of Wander Over Yonder episodes =

Wander Over Yonder is an American animated science fiction comedy television series created by Craig McCracken. It ran from August 16, 2013, to June 27, 2016. New episodes premiered on Disney Channel before being moved to Disney XD starting with the ninth episode. A total of 43 episodes (79 segments) were produced over the course of two seasons; an additional eleven shorts bridge the first and the second season.

Wander Over Yonder follows the eponymous character, Wander, and his best friend and steed Sylvia. An optimistic and adventurous traveler of the galaxies, Wander aims to help inhabitants of other planets live freely, against the intentions of Lord Hater to rule the universe. Each episode typically consists of two segments, each roughly eleven minutes in length. Several half-hour specials were also made throughout the series.

== Series overview ==
Season	Segments	Episodes		Originally released		
Season	Segments	Episodes		First released	Last released	Network
1	14	21 (Note: 39 segments total)	8	August 16, 2013	January 24, 2014	Disney Channel
1	25	21	13	March 31, 2014	December 4, 2014	Disney XD
Shorts	N/A	11		July 20, 2015	August 3, 2015	Disney XD
2	40	22		August 3, 2015	June 27, 2016	Disney XD

== Episodes ==
=== Season 1 (2013–14) ===
- Episodes from this season are listed in production order, rather than the order in which they premiered. However, due to continuity purposes, episodes 16 and 18 are swapped.

No. overall	No. in season	Title	Directed by	Written by	Storyboard by	Original release date	Prod. code	U.S. viewers (millions)
1	1	"The Greatest"	Dave Thomas and Craig McCracken	Craig McCracken and Ben Joseph; Story by : Craig McCracken	Craig McCracken and Mark Ackland	September 13, 2013 (Note: This episode was made available on Watch Disney Channel and Disney Channel On Demand on September 6, 2013.)	101	3.13
1	1	"The Egg"	Eddie Trigueros	Lauren Faust and Craig McCracken; Story by : Craig McCracken, Greg White, Dave Thomas, Lauren Faust, Johanna Stein, Ben Joseph, Alex Kirwan and Eddie Trigueros	Vaughn Tada and Eddie Trigueros	September 13, 2013	101	3.13
Lord Hater competes against Wander in a series of challenges to see if he is the greatest in the galaxy. Wander and Sylvia try to return an egg to a nest belonging to a beast who Wander thinks is the egg's mother.
2	2	"The Picnic"	Eddie Trigueros	Ben Joseph; Story by : Ben Joseph, Lauren Faust, Alex Kirwan, Craig McCracken, Johanna Stein and Greg White	Eddie Trigueros	August 16, 2013	102	2.89
2	2	"The Fugitives"	Dave Thomas	Lauren Faust and Johanna Stein; Story by : Ben Joseph, Lauren Faust, Alex Kirwan, Craig McCracken, Johanna Stein and Greg White	Mark Ackland	September 20, 2013	102	2.82
Lord Hater's battle against Emperor Awesome for ultimate cosmic power is continually disrupted when Wander has a picnic right next to the battleground. When Wander and Sylvia become wanted fugitives, Sylvia's escape plans constantly fail when Wander ignores them to help someone.
3	3	"The Good Deed"	Eddie Trigueros	Tim McKeon; Story by : Lauren Faust, Alex Kirwan, Johanna Stein, Craig McCracken, Dave Thomas, Ben Joseph, Tim McKeon and Greg White	Justin Nichols	September 27, 2013	103	2.15
3	3	"The Prisoner"	Dave Thomas	Lauren Faust and Greg White; Story by : Lauren Faust, Craig McCracken, Ben Joseph, Johanna Stein, Alex Kirwan and Greg White	Dave Thomas	October 11, 2013	103	2.19
Every time Wander does a good deed, it causes something bad to happen as a result. When Peepers takes Wander prisoner on Lord Hater's ship, he lets him get loose and must re-catch him before Lord Hater finds out.
4	4	"The Pet"	Dave Thomas and Eddie Trigueros	Ben Joseph and Greg White; Story by : Lauren Faust, Ben Joseph, Alex Kirwan, Craig McCracken, Tim McKeon, Johanna Stein, Dave Thomas and Greg White	Riccardo Durante, Dave Thomas and Eddie Trigueros	October 4, 2013	104	2.54
When Wander and Sylvia board an abandoned spaceship, they encounter a horrifying alien monster that is bent on eating them, which Wander names Captain Tim. Sylvia sees the wild beast as a threat, but Wander takes a liking to the ferocious little monster and tries to train it to be his pet.
5	5	"The Bad Guy"	Eddie Trigueros	Ben Joseph; Story by : Lauren Faust, Ben Joseph, Alex Kirwan, Craig McCracken, Tim McKeon, Johanna Stein and Greg White	Riccardo Durante	October 18, 2013	105	2.23
5	5	"The Troll"	Dave Thomas	Lauren Faust and Greg White; Story By: Lauren Faust, Ben Joseph, Craig McCracken, Tim McKeon, Johanna Stein and Greg White	Chris Houghton, Justin Nichols, Vaughn Tada and Dave Thomas	November 1, 2013	105	2.77
Wander and Sylvia land in a town inhabited by bad guys and pretend to be bad themselves so they can get to safety. Prince Cashmere and his goat warriors of Baaaaa-halla work to fight a menacing troll, but Wander sits out.
6	6	"The Little Guy"	Lauren Faust and Craig McCracken	Lauren Faust and Ben Joseph; Story by : Lauren Faust, Ben Joseph, Alex Kirwan, Craig McCracken, Tim McKeon, Johanna Stein and Greg White	Mark Ackland, Chris Houghton and Justin Nichols	December 6, 2013	106	2.36
The smallest Watchdog, Westley (voiced by Aziz Ansari), is left behind while on a hunt for Wander and Sylvia and holds them prisoners until he can get them to Lord Hater, but eventually experiences a big change in heart.
7	7	"The Box"	Dave Thomas	Tim McKeon; Story by : Lauren Faust, Ben Joseph, Alex Kirwan, Craig McCracken, Tim McKeon, Johanna Stein, Dave Thomas and Greg White	David Gemmill	November 15, 2013	107	1.91
7	7	"The Hat"	Eddie Trigueros	Lauren Faust and Johanna Stein; Story by : Lauren Faust, Ben Joseph, Alex Kirwan, Craig McCracken, Tim McKeon, Johanna Stein, Dave Thomas and Greg White	Vaughn Tada and Eddie Trigueros	November 22, 2013	107	2.20
Wander and Sylvia are asked to deliver a closed box, but Wander cannot stop obsessing over opening it. Wander gets lost while he and Sylvia are being chased by a giant worm and Sylvia uses Wander's hat in an attempt to find him.
8	8	"The Bounty"	Dave Thomas	Matt Chapman; Story by : Matt Chapman, Lauren Faust, Ben Joseph, Alex Kirwan, Craig McCracken, Tim McKeon, Dave Thomas, Johanna Stein and Greg White	Justin Nichols	January 24, 2014	108	2.04
8	8	"The Ball"	Eddie Trigueros	Ben Joseph; Story by : Lauren Faust, Ben Joseph, Alex Kirwan, Craig McCracken, Tim McKeon, Johanna Stein, Dave Thomas, Eddie Trigueros and Greg White	Ed Baker and Eddie Trigueros	January 10, 2014	108	2.29
Lord Hater hires three bounty hunters to capture Wander and Sylvia, but Commander Peepers tries to stop them so he can have all the glory for himself. The two friends help the inhabitants of a planet defend themselves from a giant cosmic dog that mistakes the planet for a ball.
9	9	"The Hero"	Dave Thomas	Ben Joseph; Story by : Lauren Faust, Ben Joseph, Alex Kirwan, Craig McCracken, Tim McKeon and Johanna Stein	John Aoshima and Vaughn Tada	March 31, 2014 (Note: Beginning with this episode, new episodes premiered on Disney XD prior to Disney Channel.)	109	0.35
9	9	"The Birthday Boy"	Eddie Trigueros	Ben Joseph; Story by : Lauren Faust, Ben Joseph, Alex Kirwan, Craig McCracken, Tim McKeon, Johanna Stein, Dave Thomas and Greg White	Eddie Trigueros	March 31, 2014	109	0.35
Wander and Sylvia work with Sir Brad Starlight (voiced by James Marsden) to fulfill Wander's fairytale dreams of rescuing a princess. Wander is determined to turn Lord Hater's Doom Arena into the ultimate party palace for his birthday party, but Lord Hater wants to see Wander cower in fear.
10	10	"The Nice Guy"	Eddie Trigueros	Ben Joseph; Story by : Lauren Faust, Ben Joseph, Craig McCracken, Tim McKeon and Johanna Stein	Justin Nichols	June 10, 2014 (Note: This episode was made available on Watch Disney XD and Disney XD On Demand on May 21, 2014.)	110	0.37
10	10	"The Time Bomb"	Dave Thomas	Matt Chapman; Story by : Matt Chapman, Lauren Faust, Ben Joseph, Craig McCracken, Tim McKeon and Johanna Stein	Eddie Trigueros	June 10, 2014	110	0.37
Wander's politeness and urge to help everyone makes a simple task much more complicated than it should be. When Wander enters Sylvia in the Galactic Conjunction 6000, he tries to keep her calm when her competitive anger issues get the better of her.
11	11	"The Fancy Party"	Eddie Trigueros	Tim McKeon; Story by : Lauren Faust, Ben Joseph, Alex Kirwan, Craig McCracken, Tim McKeon, Johanna Stein, Dave Thomas and Eddie Trigueros	Vaughn Tada	June 24, 2014	111	0.47
11	11	"The Tourist"	Dave Thomas	Johanna Stein; Story by : Lauren Faust, Ben Joseph, Alex Kirwan, Craig McCracken, Tim McKeon and Johanna Stein	Matt Danner and Dave Thomas	June 11, 2014	111	0.42
Lord Hater competes for the affections of an alien queen in order to inherit her army and take over the universe. Wander tries to outdo an elderly tourist (voiced by Edie McClurg) who has seen more of the universe than he has.
12	12	"The Day"	Dave Thomas	Ben Joseph; Story by : Lauren Faust, Ben Joseph, Alex Kirwan, Craig McCracken, Tim McKeon, Johanna Stein, Dave Thomas and Eddie Trigueros	Steve Lambe	June 16, 2014	112	0.23
12	12	"The Night"	Eddie Trigueros	Ben Joseph; Story by : Lauren Faust, Ben Joseph, Craig McCracken, Tim McKeon and Johanna Stein	Chuck Klein and Eddie Trigueros	June 16, 2014	112	0.23
Sylvia wakes up imprisoned on Lord Hater's ship with a sleeping Wander and must fight to escape. Wander must prevent a sleeping Sylvia from waking up during the night.
13	13	"The Lonely Planet"	Eddie Trigueros	Johanna Stein; Story by : Lauren Faust, Ben Joseph, Craig McCracken, Tim McKeon, Johanna Stein and Dave Thomas	Howard Perry	June 17, 2014	113	0.29
13	13	"The Brainstorm"	Dave Thomas	Ben Joseph; Story by : Lauren Faust, Ben Joseph, Craig McCracken and Johanna Stein	Mark Ackland	June 17, 2014	113	0.29
A lonely planet named Janet (voiced by Kari Wahlgren) tries to keep Wander to herself. Lord Hater and Commander Peepers brainstorm plans to stop Wander and Sylvia and invade a planet.
14	14	"The Party Animal"	Eddie Trigueros	Tim McKeon; Story by : Lauren Faust, Ben Joseph, Alex Kirwan, Craig McCracken, Tim McKeon and Johanna Stein	Justin Nichols	July 19, 2014	114	0.26
14	14	"The Toddler"	Dave Thomas	Johanna Stein; Story by : Lauren Faust, Ben Joseph, Craig McCracken, Tim McKeon and Johanna Stein	Vaughn Tada	June 23, 2014	114	0.40
Sylvia attempts to prevent Emperor Awesome from destroying a planet with his partying and Wander from joining the party. Wander and Sylvia try to return a giant lost baby to its parents, but their attempts are complicated by their different parenting methods.
15	15	"The Epic Quest of Unfathomable Difficulty!!!"	Eddie Trigueros	Francisco Angones & Amy Higgins; Story by : Lauren Faust, Ben Joseph, Craig McCracken, Amy Higgins & Francisco Angones, Johanna Stein and Dave Thomas	Riccardo Durante	June 30, 2014	115	0.33
15	15	"The Void"	Dave Thomas	Ben Joseph; Story by : Lauren Faust, Ben Joseph, Craig McCracken, Dave Thomas and Johanna Stein	Mark Ackland	June 30, 2014	115	0.33
Wander forces Sylvia to go on a quest to return a sock. Wander and Sylvia go into a place where anything can happen. When Wander does not want to leave, Sylvia tries to convince him to return home.
16	16	"The Date"	Eddie Trigueros	Francisco Angones & Amy Higgins; Story by : Lauren Faust, Ben Joseph, Craig McCracken, Johanna Stein and Dave Thomas	Riccardo Durante	October 17, 2014	118 (Note: Despite "The Date" being produced after episode 18b "The Enemies", the latter episode includes a reference to the events of the former episode.)	0.14
16	16	"The Buddies"	Dave Thomas	Ben Joseph and Ryan Walls; Story by : Lauren Faust, Ben Joseph, Ryan Walls, Craig McCracken and Johanna Stein	Justin Nichols and Dave Thomas	October 17, 2014	118	0.14
When Lord Hater gets stood up by his date, he decides to destroy her planet because of it. Wander convinces Sylvia to go on the date with Hater in order to save the planet. Lord Hater pretends to be Wander's buddy when they both get trapped in Hater's own prison dimension.
17	17	"The Liar"	Dave Thomas	Francisco Angones, Amy Higgins, Mike Chapman and Lauren Faust; Story by : Lauren Faust, Ben Joseph, Craig McCracken, Mike Chapman, Johanna Stein and Dave Thomas	Vaughn Tada	November 7, 2014	117	0.35
17	17	"The Stray"	Dave Thomas	Ben Joseph and Johanna Stein; Story by : Lauren Faust, Ben Joseph, Greg White, Tim McKeon, Craig McCracken and Johanna Stein	Mark Ackland	November 7, 2014	117	0.35
Wander guides a family of alien birds through the perils of an active volcano. Wander goes out of his way to help a cute little kitten, Delza aka Little Bits (voiced by G Hannelius), only to find that she is secretly a bounty hunter luring him into a trap.
18	18	"The Funk"	Eddie Trigueros	Darrick Bachman and Ben Joseph; Story by : Craig McCracken, Tim McKeon, Johanna Stein, Ben Joseph, Alex Kirwan and Darrick Bachman	Steve Day and Eddie Trigueros	November 25, 2014	116 (Note: Despite "The Enemies" being produced before episode 16a "The Date", the former episode includes a reference to the events of the latter episode.)	0.47
18	18	"The Enemies"	Eddie Trigueros	Ben Joseph; Story by : Lauren Faust, Craig McCracken, Ben Joseph and Johanna Stein	Howard Perry	November 25, 2014	116	0.47
Lord Hater turns to bullying the universe just to make himself feel better. Lord Hater and Sir Brad Starlight team up to fight Wander.
19	19	"The Gift"	Eddie Trigueros	Francisco Angones & Amy Higgins; Story by : Lauren Faust, Ben Joseph, Francisco Angones, Amy Higgins, Craig McCracken, Johanna Stein and Dave Thomas	Steve Day and Eddie Trigueros	December 4, 2014	119	0.59
19	19	"The Gift 2: The Giftening"	Dave Thomas	Francisco Angones & Amy Higgins; Story by : Lauren Faust, Ben Joseph, Dave Thomas, Craig McCracken, Francisco Angones, Amy Higgins and Johanna Stein	Howard Perry and Vaughn Tada	October 4, 2014 (Note: This episode premiered on Disney Channel prior to Disney XD. The episode premiered on Disney XD on October 6, 2014.)	119	2.02
Wander and Sylvia give everyone, even Lord Hater and his Watchdogs, gifts. When gifts mysteriously start appearing on Lord Hater's ship, turning their recipients into zombies, Lord Hater and Commander Peepers must escape from the surreptitious giver.
20	20	"The Big Job"	Eddie Trigueros	Eric Rogers; Story by : Lauren Faust, Ben Joseph, Craig McCracken, Amy Higgins & Francisco Angones, Johanna Stein and Eric Rogers	Eddie Trigueros	November 14, 2014	120	0.38
20	20	"The Helper"	Aaron Springer	Aaron Springer; Story by : Lauren Faust, Ben Joseph, Craig McCracken, Aaron Springer, Francisco Angones, Amy Higgins and Johanna Stein	Aaron Springer	November 14, 2014	120	0.38
Sylvia is recruited by a rebel commando team to help steal Lord Hater's latest secret weapon. Wander is unable to find anybody who actually needs his help.
21	21	"The Rider"	Dave Thomas and Eddie Trigueros	Francisco Angones, Amy Higgins and Ben Joseph; Story by : Lauren Faust, Francisco Angones, Amy Higgins, Ben Joseph, Craig McCracken and Johanna Stein	Mark Ackland and Riccardo Durante	November 28, 2014	121	0.51
When Sylvia's old partner, Ryder (voiced by Will Arnett), shows up, Wander wonders if the roguish Ryder makes a better teammate for Sylvia then he does.

=== Shorts (2015) ===
- Preceding the second season, 11 one-minute Wander shorts premiered on the Watch Disney XD app and on Disney XD's YouTube channel beginning July 20, 2015. They were directed by Dave Thomas, written by Todd Casey & ND Stevenson, and storyboarded by Mark Ackland & Ben Balistreri.

No.	Title	Original release date
1	"The First Take"	July 20, 2015
2	"The Smile"	July 21, 2015
Lord Hater attempts to destroy Wander on live TV, but Wander gives a few shout-outs to his friends across the galaxy. In the second take of his address to the galaxy, Lord Hater instructs Wander not to talk. His address goes off without a hitch, until he notices Wander's goofy smile.
3	"The Killjoy"	July 22, 2015
4	"The Theme Song"	July 23, 2015
Commander Peepers catches Hater making his address and about to destroy Wander. Hater has difficulty singing his own theme song.
5	"The Bathroom Break"	July 24, 2015
6	"The Planetary Conqueror"	July 27, 2015
While Hater is in the bathroom, Wander escapes and a Watchdog breakdances. Lord Hater keeps forgetting his line and Wander tries to help, but Hater just gets mad and messes up his line over and over again.
7	"The Sharpshooter"	July 28, 2015
8	"The Glitch"	July 29, 2015
Lord Hater successfully completes his speech. After which, he finally prepares to destroy Wander, but he cannot quite hit the target. In the eighth take, Lord Hater starts his speech again, but suddenly, the camera begins randomly freezing.
9	"The Caller"	July 30, 2015
10	"The Whatever"	July 31, 2015
In the ninth take, Lord Hater gives a shortened version of his speech, when suddenly, his glove phone starts ringing. In the tenth take, even though the camera is rolling, Lord Hater has all but given up.
11	"The Big Finish"	August 3, 2015
In the eleventh take, Wander asks Lord Hater if there is an easier way to prove he is the greatest.

=== Season 2 (2015–16) ===
No. overall	No. in season	Title	Directed by	Written by	Storyboard by	Original release date	Prod. code	US viewers (millions)
22	1	"The Greater Hater"	Dave Thomas & Eddie Trigueros	Ben Joseph, Craig McCracken, Francisco Angones & Amy Higgins; Story by : Craig McCracken, Scott Peterson, Francisco Angones, Amy Higgins, Ben Joseph, Alex Kirwan, Dave Thomas & Eddie Trigueros	Mark Ackland, Riccardo Durante & Justin Nichols	August 3, 2015	201	0.61
A new and extremely powerful villain named Lord Dominator proves to be a truly dangerous threat to the galaxy, turning Wander, Sylvia, Lord Hater, and Commander Peepers' world upside down.
23	2	"The Big Day"	Dave Thomas	Ben Joseph; Story by : Francisco Angones, Amy Higgins, Ben Joseph, Scott Peterson, ND Stevenson, Dave Thomas & Craig McCracken	Dave Thomas	August 10, 2015 (Note: This episode was made available on Watch Disney XD and Disney XD on Demand on July 13, 2015.)	202	0.43
23	2	"The Breakfast"	Dave Thomas	Amy Higgins & Craig McCracken; Story by : Craig McCracken, Francisco Angones, Craig Lewis, Todd Casey, Amy Higgins, Scott Peterson & Dave Thomas	Justin Nichols	August 10, 2015	202	0.43
Lord Hater has his chance to destroy Wander and Sylvia, but when Wander convinces him it should be a perfect doomsday, Hater tries to find a way to make the event more special. Wander and Lord Hater each struggle in their own way to make breakfast.
24	3	"The Fremergency Fronfract"	Eddie Trigueros	Francisco Angones; Story by : Craig McCracken, Scott Peterson, Francisco Angones, Amy Higgins, Ben Joseph, Craig Lewis, Dave Thomas & Eddie Trigueros	Eddie Trigueros	August 17, 2015	203	0.33
24	3	"The Boy Wander"	Eddie Trigueros	Francisco Angones; Story by : Craig McCracken, Francisco Angones, Amy Higgins, Alex Kirwan, Dave Thomas & Eddie Trigueros	Steven Lambe & Eddie Trigueros	August 17, 2015	203	0.33
Wander and Sylvia go to the dentist's to pick up Lord Hater, who is under the effects of the anesthetic. In the midst of this, Wander tries to show Hater that being good is not all that bad. In this parody of the 1960s Batman TV series, Wander seeks to thwart Dr. Screwball Jones ("Weird Al" Yankovic), an old archenemy from his past, who wants to force the galaxy to be happy.
25	4	"The Wanders"	Dave Thomas	Scott Peterson & Craig McCracken; Story by : Craig McCracken, Francisco Angones, Amy Higgins, Craig Lewis, Charlie Thomas, Dave Thomas & Scott Peterson	Mark Ackland	August 31, 2015	204	0.38
25	4	"The Axe"	Dave Thomas	Mike Yank; Story by : Craig McCracken, Francisco Angones, Amy Higgins, Mike Yank, Todd Casey & ND Stevenson	Dave Thomas	August 31, 2015	204	0.38
When Wander is split into multiple parts of his personality, Sylvia must get them all back in him before he disappears forever. But it becomes hard when Sylvia finds a certain part of Wander she thinks he's better off without. Lord Hater fires Commander Peepers and sets out to conquer several planets very well without him.
26	5	"The Loose Screw"	Eddie Trigueros	Amy Higgins & Craig McCracken; Story by : Craig McCracken, Eddie Trigueros, Francisco Angones, Amy Higgins, Dave Thomas, Todd Casey, Alex Kirwan & ND Stevenson	Eddie Trigueros	September 28, 2015	205	0.56
26	5	"The It"	Dave Thomas	Francisco Angones; Story by : Craig McCracken, Francisco Angones, Amy Higgins, Todd Casey & ND Stevenson	Benjamin Balistreri	September 28, 2015	205	0.56
Wander and Sylvia are stuck between stopping planetary invasion and helping an elderly lady fix her broken-down ship. To work his way up the Galactic Villain Leaderboard, Lord Hater plans to invade a planet, but is distracted when he becomes involved in Wander's game of tag.
27	6	"The Cool Guy"	Eddie Trigueros	Todd Casey; Story by : Craig McCracken, Amy Higgins, Dave Thomas, Scott Peterson, Todd Casey, ND Stevenson & Eddie Trigueros	Riccardo Durante	October 5, 2015	206	0.38
27	6	"The Catastrophe"	Dave Thomas	ND Stevenson; Story by : Craig McCracken, Dave Thomas, Francisco Angones, Amy Higgins, Alex Kirwan, Todd Casey, ND Stevenson & Eddie Trigueros	Mark Ackland	October 5, 2015	206	0.38
Lord Hater ditches Commander Peepers to party with Emperor Awesome. Sylvia discovers Wander's new obsession with funny cat videos is part of a more fiendish viral plot.
28	7	"The Rager"	Eddie Trigueros	Nate Federman & Craig McCracken; Story by : Craig McCracken, Dave Thomas, Francisco Angones, Amy Higgins, Nate Federman, Todd Casey, ND Stevenson & Eddie Trigueros	Riccardo Durante	October 19, 2015	207	0.41
28	7	"The Good Bad Guy"	Eddie Trigueros	Todd Casey; Story by : Craig McCracken, Dave Thomas, Francisco Angones, Amy Higgins, Alex Kirwan, Todd Casey, ND Stevenson & Eddie Trigueros	Vaughn Tada	October 19, 2015	207	0.41
Lord Hater tries to crash a party Wander is throwing for his prisoners. Lord Hater meets his villainous idol, Major Threat.
29	8	"The Battle Royale"	Dave Thomas & Eddie Trigueros	Francisco Angones & Amy Higgins; Story by : Craig McCracken, Alex Kirwan, Francisco Angones, Amy Higgins, ND Stevenson, Todd Casey, Dave Thomas & Eddie Trigueros	Benjamin Balistreri & Eddie Trigueros	October 26, 2015	208	0.70
Upon discovering that Lord Dominator is actually a girl, Wander attempts to set her up with Lord Hater and inadvertently sparks a massive rumble among every villain in the galaxy.
30	9	"The Matchmaker"	Eddie Trigueros	Amy Higgins; Story by : Craig McCracken, Francisco Angones, Amy Higgins, Todd Casey & ND Stevenson	Howard Perry	November 9, 2015	209	0.47
30	9	"The New Toy"	Dave Thomas	Ben Joseph; Story by : Craig McCracken, Ben Joseph, Francisco Angones, Amy Higgins, Todd Casey & ND Stevenson	Dave Thomas	November 9, 2015	209	0.47
When Wander stumbles upon Lord Hater's unopened love letter to Lord Dominator, Sylvia tries to prevent him from delivering it. Commander Peepers' efforts to take down Lord Dominator are thwarted when Lord Hater attempts to woo her with his new "vehicle."
31	10	"The Black Cube"	Dave Thomas	Francisco Angones; Story by : Craig McCracken, Andy Bean, Francisco Angones, Amy Higgins, Todd Casey & ND Stevenson	Benjamin Balistreri	November 16, 2015	210	0.36
31	10	"The Eye on the Skullship"	Eddie Trigueros	Todd Casey; Story by : Craig McCracken, Francisco Angones, Amy Higgins, Todd Casey & ND Stevenson	Vaughn Tada	November 16, 2015	210	0.36
The Black Cube is slated to be the worst villain ever to do crime. Andy the Watchdog seeks to interview Lord Hater for his video blog.
32	11	"The Secret Planet"	Eddie Trigueros	ND Stevenson; Story by : Craig McCracken, Francisco Angones, Amy Higgins, Todd Casey & ND Stevenson	Vaughn Tada	January 25, 2016	211	0.53
32	11	"The Bad Hatter"	Dave Thomas	Sam Riegel; Story by : Craig McCracken, Sam Riegel, Francisco Angones, Amy Higgins, Todd Casey & ND Stevenson	Dave Thomas	January 25, 2016	211	0.53
Wander tells white lies that lead to crazy consequences which threaten to reveal a hidden planet to Lord Dominator. Lord Hater steals Wander's hat to impress Lord Dominator.
33	12	"The Hole...Lotta Nuthin'"	Eddie Trigueros	Todd Casey; Story by : Craig McCracken, Francisco Angones, Amy Higgins, Todd Casey & ND Stevenson	Eddie Trigueros	February 1, 2016	212	0.34
33	12	"The Show Stopper"	Dave Thomas	Todd Casey; Story by : Craig McCracken, Francisco Angones, Amy Higgins, Todd Casey & ND Stevenson	Mark Ackland	February 1, 2016	212	0.34
Wander gets his finger stuck in a black hole and has to pass the time while Sylvia tries to find a suitable seal. Lord Hater, with the help of Wander, performs a rock concert to get Lord Dominator's attention, while Sylvia and Commander Peepers try to stop them before it is too late.
34	13	"The Cartoon"	Benjamin Balistreri & Dave Thomas	Ben Joseph; Story by : Craig McCracken, Ben Joseph, Francisco Angones, Amy Higgins, Todd Casey & ND Stevenson	Benjamin Balistreri	February 8, 2016	213	0.39
34	13	"The Bot"	Dave Thomas	ND Stevenson; Story by : Craig McCracken, Francisco Angones, Amy Higgins, Todd Casey & ND Stevenson	Mark Ackland	February 8, 2016	213	0.39
Lord Hater orders the Watchdogs to create a propaganda cartoon about him. Lord Dominator instructs her bots to locate planets for her to ransack for Volcanium X. Her most efficient henchbot, Bot 13, finds a vacation planet that holds a massive amount of Volcanium X. It then bumps into Wander, who names it Beep Boop and inveigles it into being his travel friend to have fun.
35	14	"The Family Reunion"	Eddie Trigueros	Amy Higgins; Story by : Craig McCracken, Francisco Angones, Amy Higgins, Todd Casey & ND Stevenson	Vaughn Tada	February 22, 2016	214	0.51
35	14	"The Rival"	Eddie Trigueros	ND Stevenson; Story by : Craig McCracken, Francisco Angones, Amy Higgins, Todd Casey & ND Stevenson	Riccardo Durante	February 22, 2016	214	0.51
Wander and Sylvia hide out in her home planet away from Lord Dominator. Over there, she reunites with her relatives but is annoyed by her Ma believing that she ran away in her past and has to pay the price for returning. When Emperor Awesome enters Lord Dominator's ship, Lord Hater and Commander Peepers question whether they are working together with a secret weapon, or if they are just dating.
36	15	"My Fair Hatey"	Dave Thomas, Eddie Trigueros & Justin Nichols	Andy Bean, Francisco Angones & Amy Higgins; Story by : Craig McCracken, Andy Bean, Francisco Angones, Amy Higgins, Todd Casey & ND Stevenson	Dave Thomas, Eddie Trigueros & Justin Nichols	February 29, 2016	215	0.35
In this musical episode with music and words by Andy Bean, Lord Hater enlists Wander's help to ask Lord Dominator on a date. Meanwhile, Sylvia and Commander Peepers hatch a plan to disable Dominator's ship with Frostonium.
37	16	"The Legend"	Dave Thomas	Francisco Angones; Story by : Craig McCracken, Francisco Angones, Amy Higgins, Todd Casey & ND Stevenson	Mark Ackland, Justin Nichols & James W. Suhr	March 7, 2016	216	0.47
37	16	"The Bad Neighbors"	Eddie Trigueros	Sam Riegel, Francisco Angones & Craig McCracken; Story by : Craig McCracken, Sam Riegel, Francisco Angones, Amy Higgins, Todd Casey & ND Stevenson	Riccardo Durante	March 7, 2016	216	0.47
Wander and Sylvia save a group of kids from a Lord Dominator invasion as the kids tell stories about a familiar mythic hero. Commander Peepers desperately tries to come up with a plan to save the galaxy from Lord Dominator, while Lord Hater obsesses over their annoying new neighbor.
38	17	"The Party Poopers"	Dave Thomas and Benjamin Balistreri	Todd Casey; Story by : Craig McCracken, Francisco Angones, Amy Higgins, Todd Casey & ND Stevenson	Benjamin Balistreri	April 4, 2016	217	0.34
38	17	"The Waste of Time"	Eddie Trigueros	Rachel Vine; Story by : Craig McCracken, Rachel Vine, Francisco Angones, Amy Higgins, Todd Casey & ND Stevenson	Howie Perry	April 11, 2016	217	0.41
Wander fights a massive case of the giggles while trying to impress a race of beings with unusual faces. When Wander and Sylvia accidentally buy Time Orbbles, Sylvia must keep Wander focused or risk being lost in time forever.
39	18	"The Hot Shot"	Dave Thomas	Amy Higgins, Francisco Angones & Craig McCracken; Story by : Craig McCracken, Francisco Angones, Amy Higgins, Todd Casey & ND Stevenson	Dave Thomas	May 30, 2016	218	0.19
39	18	"The Night Out"	Eddie Trigueros	ND Stevenson; Story by : Craig McCracken, Francisco Angones, Amy Higgins, Todd Casey & ND Stevenson	Vaughn Tada	May 30, 2016	218	0.19
Sylvia becomes jealous when a new hero that mimics Wander shows up. However, this "new hero" turns out to be a familiar face. While Lord Dominator waits for her suit to update, she disguises herself and goes out to cause chaos. Eventually, she runs into Sylvia, and they spend the night together.
40	19	"The Search for Captain Tim"	Eddie Trigueros	Francisco Angones; Story by : Craig McCracken, Francisco Angones, Amy Higgins, Todd Casey & ND Stevenson	Riccardo Durante	June 6, 2016	219	0.23
40	19	"The Heebie Jeebies"	Dave Thomas	Todd Casey; Story by : Craig McCracken, Francisco Angones, Amy Higgins, Todd Casey & ND Stevenson	Mark Ackland	June 6, 2016	219	0.23
Lord Hater's beloved pet, Captain Tim, goes missing. In the midst of searching, he meets Ripov, a hunter of Captain Tim's species, and she helps Hater find him. Little does Hater know, Ripov has other plans for Captain Tim. Wander and Sylvia go deep into a forest to uncover an ancient power to stop Lord Dominator. However, Wander becomes paranoid when he believes the forest is haunted by mysterious ghosts called phantomimes.
41	20	"The Sick Day"	Dave Thomas & Benjamin Balistreri	ND Stevenson; Story by : Craig McCracken, Francisco Angones, Amy Higgins, Todd Casey & ND Stevenson	Benjamin Balistreri	June 13, 2016	220	0.27
41	20	"The Sky Guy"	Eddie Trigueros	Francisco Angones & Amy Higgins; Story by : Craig McCracken, Francisco Angones, Amy Higgins, Todd Casey & ND Stevenson	Vaughn Tada	June 13, 2016	220	0.27
When Wander gets sick, he requests that Sylvia completes his morning routine of helping others for him. However, instead of getting bed rest like Sylvia asked him to do, Wander continuously tries to help her with the routine. Wander and Sylvia search for a weapon to stop Lord Dominator in an enchanted shop owned by a wizard named Neckbeard. In the midst of searching, Wander comes across an orb with a planet of many small aliens inside, and he tries to set them free from the orb without Neckbeard noticing.
42	21	"The Robomechabotatron"	Dave Thomas	Sam Riegel; Story by : Craig McCracken, Sam Riegel, Francisco Angones, Amy Higgins, Todd Casey & ND Stevenson	Dave Thomas	June 20, 2016	221	0.41
42	21	"The Flower"	Eddie Trigueros	Rachel Vine; Story by : Craig McCracken, Rachel Vine, Francisco Angones, Amy Higgins, Todd Casey & ND Stevenson	Eddie Trigueros	June 20, 2016	221	0.41
Wander must get himself, Sylvia, Lord Hater, and Commander Peepers to work together to successfully activate the Robomechabotatron, a robot that can help stop Lord Dominator. With nearly every planet in the galaxy destroyed by Lord Dominator, Sylvia fears that everything's hopeless because Wander's sad. In an attempt to feel better, they try to take care of the one living thing any planet around them has to offer: a flower.
43	22	"The End of the Galaxy"	Dave Thomas & Eddie Trigueros	Francisco Angones; Story by : Craig McCracken, Francisco Angones, Amy Higgins, Todd Casey & ND Stevenson	Mark Ackland & Riccardo Durante	June 27, 2016	222	0.33
After Lord Dominator destroys Binglebopolopolis, the secret planet has become the only planet left in the entire galaxy. On the planet, Sylvia forms a resistance to stop Dominator once and for all. Lord Hater, Commander Peepers, and the Watchdogs eventually help the resistance so that they can begin conquering the galaxy again. Meanwhile, Wander tries to figure out why Dominator is evil in the first place and tries to become friends with her.
