= Egg Island, Horseshoe Reef =

Coordinates: 41°09′S 146°25′E

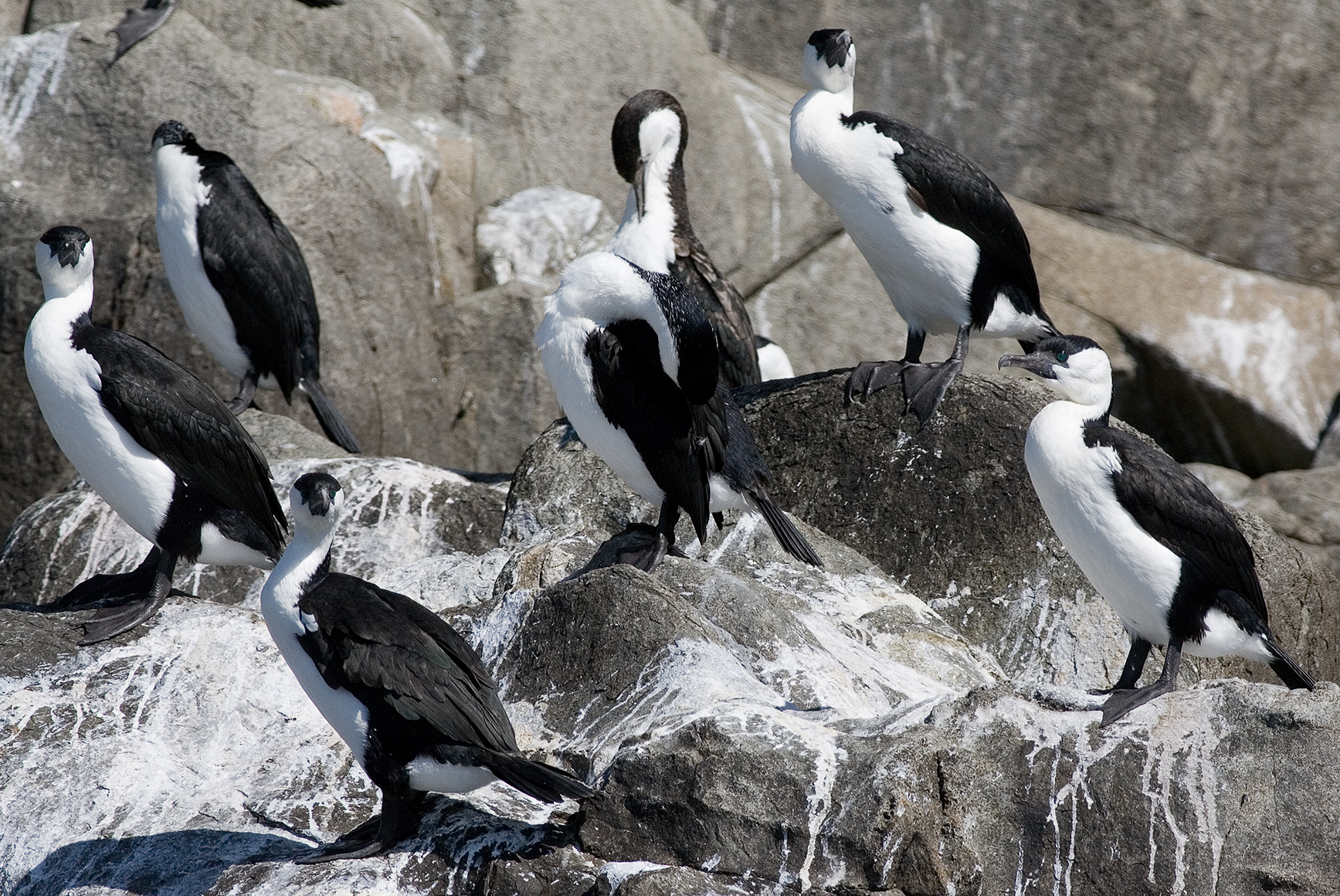
The site is important for black-faced cormorants

Egg Island is a small island, with an area of 0.83 ha, in south-eastern Australia. It is part of the North Coast Group, lying in Bass Strait on Horseshoe Reef near Devonport in north-west Tasmania. It has been identified as an Important Bird Area (IBA) because of its globally significant colony of black-faced cormorants. Wright Island is nearby.

== Fauna ==
Recorded breeding seabird species include little penguin, black-faced cormorant (over 500 pairs), silver gull, crested tern and Caspian tern.
