= Spies in Disguise =

2019 Blue Sky Studios film directed by Nick Bruno and Troy Quane

- Theatrical release poster
- Directed by: Nick Bruno and Troy Quane
- Screenplay by: Brad Copeland; Lloyd Taylor
- Story by: Cindy Davis
- Based on: Pigeon: Impossible by Lucas Martell
- Produced by: Peter Chernin; Jenno Topping; Michael J. Travers
- Starring: Will Smith; Tom Holland; Rashida Jones; Ben Mendelsohn; Reba McEntire; Rachel Brosnahan; Karen Gillan; DJ Khaled; Masi Oka
- Edited by: Randy Trager; Christopher Campbell
- Music by: Theodore Shapiro
- Production companies: 20th Century Fox; Blue Sky Studios
- Distributed by: 20th Century Fox
- Release dates: December 4, 2019 (El Capitan Theatre); December 25, 2019 (United States)
- Running time: 102 minutes
- Country: United States
- Language: English
- Budget: $100 million
- Box office: $171.6 million

Spies in Disguise is a 2019 American animated spy comedy film produced by Blue Sky Studios and distributed by 20th Century Fox. Directed by Nick Bruno and Troy Quane and based on Pigeon: Impossible by Lucas Martell, it stars the voice talents of Will Smith, Tom Holland, Rashida Jones, Ben Mendelsohn, Reba McEntire, Rachel Brosnahan, Karen Gillan, DJ Khaled, and Masi Oka. In the film, the plot involves super secret spy agent Lance Sterling (Smith) who befriends the intelligent young scientist Walter Beckett (Holland), the two must then work together to stop the revenge-seeking cybernetic terrorist Killian (Mendelsohn).

Spies in Disguise first premiered at the El Capitan Theatre in Los Angeles, California in the United States on December 4, 2019, and it was first released theatrically in the United States by 20th Century Fox on December 25, 2019. It received generally positive reviews from critics and it grossed a total box office of $172 million against a total budget of $100 million.

Spies in Disguise was the last film to be produced by Blue Sky Studios before The Walt Disney Company closed down Blue Sky Studios on April 10, 2021.

== Plot ==
Lance Sterling, a cocky secret agent of H.T.U.V. (Honor, Trust, Unity and Valor), is sent to recover an attack drone from Japanese arms dealer Katsu Kimura in Japan. As soon as the buyer, cybernetically enhanced terrorist Killian, arrives, Lance breaks in against the orders of H.T.U.V. director Joy Jenkins, defeats Kimura and his gang, and manages to escape with the briefcase containing the drone. Lance returns to the H.T.U.V. headquarters to confront Walter Beckett, a socially inept MIT graduate and outcast young scientist, for equipping nonlethal weapons into his suit. Walter tries to convince Sterling that there is a more peaceful way rescuing the world but Lance fires him before he can explain his latest invention: "biodynamic concealment".

Lance discovers the briefcase to be empty and is confronted by Marcy Kappel, an internal affairs agent, who reveals footage of Lance – actually Killian in a holographic disguise – leaving with the drone, labeling him as a traitor. Lance escapes the H.T.U.V. and decides to track down Walter to help him disappear. Meanwhile, Killian breaks into the H.T.U.V. covert weapons facility.

While searching Walter's home for his invention, Lance ingests the concoction and transforms into a pigeon by undergoing "chromothripsis". Before Walter and Lance can decide what to do next, Marcy and other H.T.U.V. agents chase the duo through the city, but the duo escape in Lance's spy car. The two track down Kimura at a resort in Playa del Carmen, Mexico. There, they learn of Killian's whereabouts in Venice, Italy before Marcy and the H.T.U.V. can capture them again.

Arriving in Venice, Walter is confronted by the H.T.U.V., who are unaware of Lance's condition. Revealing that she knows about Wendy, Walter's mother who was a police officer who died on duty, Marcy tries to convince him to help turn Lance in, but Walter refuses. Suddenly, a drone distracts the H.T.U.V. and allows Walter and Lance to escape. The two discover the drone carrying the H.T.U.V. agent database, and Walter manages to retrieve it. However, Killian shows up, takes the database and prepares to kill Walter. With help from hundreds of pigeons in the surrounding area, they distract Killian and flee. Disguised as Lance once more, Killian escapes the H.T.U.V., shaking Marcy's suspicions of Lance upon her seeing him with a robot hand.

Whilst underwater in a submarine, Walter reveals he planted a tracking device on Killian and locates him at the weapons facility. Walter manages to perfect the antidote and successfully turns Lance human again. Reaching Killian's hideout, Lance is concerned about Walter's safety and sends him away in the submarine. Once inside, Lance confronts Killian, but is knocked out and captured as Killian reveals he has mass-produced hundreds of drones to target everyone at the agency using the database as revenge for killing his crew and the people he loved, in a past mission led by Lance. Noticing Walter returning in the submarine, Killian destroys it; unbeknownst to them, Walter survives with the help of one of his inventions, the inflatable hug.

Once Walter frees Lance, the two escape and contact Marcy for support as the drones approach H.T.U.V. headquarters in Washington D.C. Walter attempts to hack into Killian's bionic arm but when Killian realizes this, he tries to flee via air with a drone, but Walter catches up. Walter risks his life by trapping Killian in the inflatable hug and deactivates the villain's arm as Walter himself falls, but Lance, who has turned himself back into a pigeon, successfully flies for the first time and carries him to safety with help from other pigeons, while Killian is found and arrested.

Despite rescuing the world, Lance – back in his human form – and Walter are fired for insubordination. However, they are quickly rehired by the H.T.U.V. as the agency could learn from Walter's more peaceful ways of handling villainy.

== Voice cast ==
- Will Smith as Lance Sterling, the world's super secret spy agent who is transformed into a pigeon by Walter
- Tom Holland as Walter Beckett, a 18-year-old socially inept scientific genius who graduated from MIT at age 15 and designs gadgets. He turns Sterling into a pigeon with a new invention of his, but must now help him return to his human form.
  - Jarrett Bruno as a 8-year-old Walter
- Ben Mendelsohn as Killian, a powerful technology-based terrorist mastermind with a left bionic arm that controls an array of weaponized drones that threatens the world
- Rashida Jones as Marcy Kappel, a aggressive security forces agent of internal affairs in pursuit of Lance Sterling, who she believes is a traitor
- Reba McEntire as Joy Jenkins, a director of H.T.U.V. and Sterling's superior
- Rachel Brosnahan as Wendy Beckett, a police officer and Walter's mother who was killed on duty when her son was younger
- Karen Gillan as Eyes, a H.T.U.V. specialist in spectral analysis and quantum optical thermography who is paired with Ears.
- DJ Khaled as Ears, a H.T.U.V. specialist in communications and ultrasonics who is paired with Eyes
- Masi Oka as Katsu Kimura, a Japanese arms dealer and an associate to Killian
- Carla Jimenez as Geraldine, a security agent at H.T.U.V.

Olly Murs appears as a Junior Agent, while Mark Ronson voices an Agency Control Room Technician. The voice of Lance's car, an Audi RSQ e-tron, is provided by Kimberly Brooks. South Korean voice actors So Yeon and Jang Min-hyuk provided the voices of Soo-min and Joon respectively, the protagonists in a South Korean television drama series Walter is a fan of in the film.

== Production ==
=== Announcement ===
On October 9, 2017, it was announced that development was underway on a film based on the animated short Pigeon: Impossible (2009) with both Will Smith and Tom Holland being set to voice both main characters.

Spies in Disguise was the directorial debut of Nick Bruno, and the second for Troy Quane, after having directed the short film The Smurfs: A Christmas Carol (2011).

Spies in Disguise was dedicated to the memory of Joe Kwong, who was working at Walt Disney Animation Studios and Blue Sky Studios at the time of his death.

=== Casting ===
On October 29, 2018, new additions to the voice cast included Ben Mendelsohn, Karen Gillan, Rashida Jones, DJ Khaled and Masi Oka. On July 23, 2019, Reba McEntire and Rachel Brosnahan joined the cast. On September 9, 2019, Carla Jimenez was added as well.

== Music ==
=== Score ===
On June 12, 2018, it was reported that Theodore Shapiro was set to compose the film's score. The film's score album was released by Hollywood Records and Fox Music on December 25, 2019.

=== EP soundtrack ===
On June 11, 2019, it was announced that Mark Ronson would be the film's executive music producer. Head of Fox Music Danielle Diego expressed excitement at working with Ronson, stating that "his unique blend of vintage soul and funk exceptionally captures the soul of [the] film." On November 22, 2019, an original song for the film entitled "Then There Were Two", performed by Ronson and Anderson .Paak, was released. Two days later, an extended play album titled Mark Ronson Presents the Music of Spies in Disguise was announced, featuring five new songs written for the film as well as Rob Base & DJ E-Z Rock's "It Takes Two". The EP was released digitally on December 13, 2019, by RCA Records.

== Release ==
=== Theatrical ===
Spies in Disguise was originally scheduled for a theatrical release date in movie theaters by 20th Century Fox on January 18, 2019, however, the film was delayed to April 19, 2019 and then to September 13, 2019 before finalizing to Christmas Day on Wednesday, December 25, 2019, Spies in Disguise has had held its world premiere at the El Capitan Theatre in Los Angeles, California in the United States on December 4, 2019.

=== Home media ===
Spies in Disguise was first released digitally and physically in the United States on 4K Ultra HD Blu-ray, Blu-ray, DVD, and digital download by Walt Disney Studios Home Entertainment (through Buena Vista Home Entertainment and 20th Century Fox Home Entertainment) on March 10, 2020, and it was first released digitally in the United States on Disney+ on September 23, 2022.

== Reception ==
=== Box office ===
Spies in Disguise grossed a total box office of $66.8 million in the United States, and a total box office $104.9 million in other territories, for a worldwide total box office of $171.6 million.

In the United States, Spies in Disguise was first released theatrically in movie theaters on Christmas Day on Wednesday, December 25, 2019, alongside Little Women, 1917, and Just Mercy, as well as the worldwide expansion of Uncut Gems, and it was projected to gross $19–23 million from 3,502 movie theaters over its five-day opening weekend. The film made $4.8 million on Christmas Day and $4.1 million on its second day. It went on to make $13.2 million during its opening weekend, for a total of $22.1 million over the five-day Christmas Day period, finishing fifth. In its second weekend the film made $10.1 million, finishing sixth. In its third weekend, it grossed $5.1 million, dropping 50.9% from the previous weekend and finishing at 10th place. The film's budget is undisclosed. IndieWire estimated that it may have been $100 million or more, based on all of the previous Blue Sky Studios films.

=== Critical response ===
On the review aggregator website Rotten Tomatoes, 77% of 125 critics' reviews are positive, with an average rating of 6.6/10. The website's consensus reads: "A cheerfully undemanding animated adventure that's elevated by its voice cast, Spies in Disguise is funny, fast-paced, and family-friendly enough to satisfy." Metacritic gave the film a weighted average score of 54 out of 100, based on 22 critics, indicating "mixed or average reviews". Audiences polled by CinemaScore gave the film an average grade of "A−" on an A+ to F scale, while those surveyed by PostTrak gave it an average 3.5 out of 5 stars.

Peter Bradshaw of The Guardian gave the film three out of five stars, calling it an "entertaining family adventure", and praising the vocal work of Smith and Holland.

Kwak Yeon-soo, a reporter at The Korea Times, wrote that the film failed to convey its message because of its "lackluster narrative". Kwak also pointed out that the film tried to attract audiences there by putting references to the South Korean popular culture, and that it ended up exemplifying Walter Beckett's "weird" personality.

=== Accolades ===
Award	Date of ceremony	Category	Recipient(s)	Result	Ref.
Golden Reel Awards	January 19, 2020	Outstanding Achievement in Sound Editing – Feature Animation	Leff Lefferts, Jeremy Bowker, Randy Thom, Bjorn Ole Schroeder, Samson Neslund, David Farmer, Michael Silvers, Larry Oatfield, Chris Manning, Shelley Roden, John Roesch	Nominated	
Annie Awards	January 25, 2020	Outstanding Achievement for Character Design in an Animated Feature Production	José Manuel Fernández Oli	Nominated	
Annie Awards	January 25, 2020	Outstanding Achievement for Music in an Animated Feature Production	Mark Ronson, Theodore Shapiro	Nominated	
Saturn Awards	October 26, 2021	Best Animated Film	Spies in Disguise	Nominated	
