= Nick Bruno and Troy Quane =

American filmmakers

- Occupations: Film directors; Film animators
- Years active: 2006–present (Bruno); 1995–present (Quane); American; Canadian (Quane)

Nick Bruno and Troy Quane are American filmmakers and animators. They are best known for directing the animated films Spies in Disguise (2019) and Nimona (2023), with the latter being nominated for the Academy Award for Best Animated Feature.

== Career ==
Quane began as a 2D animator in 1995 before starting his career at Walt Disney Studios as a storyboard artist on the films The Wild (2006) and Enchanted (2007). He later left the company to serve as a story artist on 9 (2009), Arthur Christmas (2011), and Hotel Transylvania (2012). In 2011, Quane began his directorial career with the film The Smurfs: A Christmas Carol. In 2012, Quane was hired to co-direct the film Kazorn & The Unicorn with Kelly Asbury.

Bruno began his career at Blue Sky Studios as an animator on four Ice Age films: The Meltdown (2006), Dawn of the Dinosaurs (2009), Continental Drift (2012), and Collision Course (2016). He was also an animator on Rio (2011), Epic (2013), Rio 2 (2014), and The Peanuts Movie (2015). In 2019, Quane and Bruno first teamed up to direct the animated comedy film Spies in Disguise, for Blue Sky Studios. On May 22, 2019, Bruno worked on a graphic novel called Urban Legendz with Blue Sky animator Paul Downs and Pixar animator Micheal Yates, and was released around June.

In April 2022, it was announced that they would direct the Netflix animated film Nimona, which was released in June 2023. Bruno and Quane were nominated for the Academy Award for Best Animated Feature, but lost to Hayao Miyazaki's The Boy and the Heron. In September 2023, Bruno was hired to direct a film for Annapurna Animation. In February 2024, Quane expressed interest in making sequels and spin-offs to Nimona. In March 2025, Quane was hired to direct The Wild Robot Escapes for DreamWorks Animation, replacing Chris Sanders, who wrote and directed The Wild Robot, and remains as a screenwriter in the sequel. Before he was hired to direct The Wild Robot Escapes, he was developing an untitled original film at DreamWorks Animation.

== Filmography ==
Both Quane and Bruno

Year	Title	Credited as					Notes / Ref(s)
Year	Title	Animator	Storyboard artist	Director	Story writer	Other	Notes / Ref(s)
2015	The Peanuts Movie	Bruno only	Yes	No	No	Bruno only	Animation Supervisor Bruno only
2016	Ice Age: Collision Course	Bruno only	Quane only	No	No	No	
2019	Spies in Disguise	No	No	Yes	No	Yes	Additional voices
2023	Nimona	No	No	Yes	Yes	Yes	Additional voices

Troy Quane

Year	Title	Credited as			Notes / Ref(s)
Year	Title	Animator	Storyboard artist	Director	Notes / Ref(s)
1997	Beauty and the Beast: The Enchanted Christmas	Yes	No	No	2D Animator - Belle
1998	Pocahontas II: Journey to a New World	Yes	No	No	2D Animator
1999	Mickey's Once Upon a Christmas	Yes	No	No	2D Animator
2000	The Tigger Movie	Yes	No	No	2D Animator
2000	Titan A.E.	Yes	No	No	2D Animator - Uncredited
2001	Osmosis Jones	Yes	No	No	2D Animator
2002	Eight Crazy Nights	Yes	No	No	2D Animator
2006	Curious George	Yes	No	No	2D Animator
2006	The Wild	No	Yes	No	
2007	Enchanted	No	Yes	No	Storyboard Supervisor
2009	9	No	Yes	No	
2011	Arthur Christmas	No	Yes	No	
2011	The Smurfs: A Christmas Carol	No	No	Yes	
2012	Hotel Transylvania	No	Yes	No	
2017	Ferdinand	No	Yes	No	
TBA	The Wild Robot Escapes †	No	No	Yes	

Nick Bruno

Year	Title	Credited as		Notes / Ref(s)
Year	Title	Animator	Director	Notes / Ref(s)
2006	Ice Age: The Meltdown	Yes	No	
2006	No Time for Nuts	Yes	No	
2008	Horton Hears a Who!	Yes	No	Animation Character Leads - The Whos
2008	Surviving Sid	Yes	No	
2009	Ice Age: Dawn of the Dinosaurs	Yes	No	
2011	Rio	Yes	No	
2012	Ice Age: Continental Drift	Yes	No	Animation Supervisor
2013	Epic	Yes	No	
2014	Rio 2	Yes	No	Development Animation Supervisor
TBA	Untitled Annapurna Animation film †	No	Yes	

== Bibliography ==
- Urban Legendz (2019) Bruno only

== Accolades ==
Award	Date of ceremony	Category	Film	Result	Ref.
Visual Effects Society Awards	February 2, 2016	Outstanding Visual Effects in an Animated Feature	The Peanuts Movie	Nominated	
Seattle Film Critics Society Awards	January 8, 2024	Best Animated Feature	Nimona	Nominated	
Alliance of Women Film Journalists Awards	January 19, 2024	Best Animated Film	Nimona	Nominated	
Annie Awards	February 17, 2024	Outstanding Achievement for Directing in a Feature Production	Nimona	Nominated	
Academy Awards	March 10, 2024	Best Animated Feature	Nimona	Nominated	
Hugo Awards	August 11, 2024	Best Dramatic Presentation (Long Form)	Nimona	Nominated	
