= He-Man: Defender of Grayskull =

2005 video game

- Developer: Savage Entertainment
- Publisher: Midas Interactive Entertainment
- Platform: PlayStation 2
- Release: EU: February 25, 2005
- Genre: Action
- Mode: Single-player

He-Man: Defender of Grayskull is a 2005 multi-platform action-adventure game follow up to the 2003 Game Boy Advance game He-Man: Power of Grayskull. The game was developed by Savage Entertainment. Versions for GameCube, Game Boy Advance and Xbox were also in development, but despite being completed, sent to press for review, and even featured on the Xbox 360 Backwards Compatibility list, these versions were never released. An early prototype of the Xbox version, which predates the PlayStation 2 release by almost two years, was released online in September 2021.

== Gameplay ==
He-Man: Defender of Grayskull is an action adventure game view from a third person perspective. It starts the player off with limited powers and slowly allows He-Man to gain them as the levels progress. There is an emphasis on the various combat moves used by He-Man to defeat different enemies. As He-Man fights his way through the obstacles in each level, he adds new techniques and methods to his repertoire. At the start only the two handed sword is available, but later He-Man can swing his one handed sword with a shield combination or wield his magical axe. Each weapon has three basic moves and nine special moves, giving the players a versatile choice to choose from. Some combinations are more effective on certain enemies.

Although He-Man has several abilities, they have a limit. Players need to keep an eye out for two bars on the top screen; the health bar and the Grayskull bar. Just like any other game, once He-Man's health bar reaches zero, the game ends and Skeletor's army prevails. There are several game saving points within the levels. This allows the gamers to keep track of their progress and also at the same time, not lose much when He-Man loses health. The Grayskull bar monitors the special skill and combination attacks which can only performed when the bar is filled up to the limit or a certain level.

There are several supporting characters in the game. The Sorceress keeps on communicating with He-Man telepathically and also provides hints and tips to nudge He-Man in the right direction. Boss enemies are also present, some taken from the popular TV series itself such as Tri-Klops and some which are original, like the Sphinx. Some boss enemies help He-Man in the later levels when he defeats them. Apart from that, Battle Cat, Teela & Man-at-Arms make appearances as well, aiding He-Man in his journey. Battle Cat can be used to ride on to fight off enemies, or can be summoned to attack the enemies while you control He-Man to fire missiles from a distance, using the Tiger Armor. The cast of the 2002 animated series reprise their voice roles.

== Plot ==
Skeletor lures He-Man to Snake Mountain with a false threat, only to strike Castle Grayskull with the full might of his forces during the hero's absence. To prevent Skeletor's from taking the castle, the Sorceress of Grayskull channels all of her power into the castle's defenses, including He-Man's powers, turning him back to Prince Adam. To stop Skeletor, Adam must battle his way out of Snake Mountain and traverse Eternia to reach the castle, regaining his powers along the way.

== Release ==
TDK Mediactive announced the title in May 2003.

In February 2005, European budget publisher Midas Interactive Entertainment announced they had acquired the publishing rights to the title and would release the PlayStation 2 version of the game on the 25th.

== Reception ==
He-Man: Defender of Grayskull received mixed reviews from users and critics. Nintendo Power editors gave the unreleased GameCube version an average rating of 1.9 out of 5. German GamePro Magazine points out in 2005, that the game is three years late and criticizes the game for its PS1 graphics and that "The fun has hidden itself in the furthest corner of castle Greyskull" and recommended that fans rather play with the action figures, than buying the game.

British gaming website Games Xtreme gave the PlayStation 2 version a mixed assessment, describing it as "run of the mill in every imaginable aspect." The review criticized the repetitive gameplay, limited game modes, graphical glitches, and lack of replay value, while praising the inclusion of characters from the animated series and the game's adherence to the cartoon's script and atmosphere. The reviewer concluded that the game was enjoyable in places but ultimately disappointing due to numerous design flaws.
