= Masters of the Universe =

American media franchise

- Franchise logo
- Created by: Mattel
- Original work: Masters of the Universe (1982–1988)
- Owner: Mattel
- Years: 1982–present

Print publications
- Books: Golden, Ladybird, World IP & Kid Stuff books (1983–1990); Dark Horse Books (2012–present)
- Comics: Mattel mini-comics (1982–1989); 1st DC series (1982–1983); German series (1983–1990); Marvel Star (1986–1987); Brazilian series (1986–1988); MVC & Image Comics (2002–2005); MOTUC mini-comics (2011–2015); 2nd DC series (2012–2020); MOTU Dark Horse Comics (2021–present)
- Comic strip: Daily newspaper comic strip (1985–1989)
- Magazines: He-Man and the Masters of the Universe Magazine (1985–1988); She-Ra Princess of Power Magazine (1986–1987); UK MOTU & He-Man Adventure magazines (1986–1990); UK She-Ra magazine (1986–1987); Italy Più & Magic Boy magazines (1984–1990)

Films and television
- Films: The Secret of the Sword (1985); Masters of the Universe (1987); Masters of the Universe (2026)
- Animated series: He-Man and the Masters of the Universe (1983–1985); She-Ra: Princess of Power (1985–1987); The New Adventures of He-Man (1990–1991); He-Man and the Masters of the Universe (2002–2004); She-Ra and the Princesses of Power (2018–2020); Masters of the Universe Revelation / Revolution (2021–2024); He-Man and the Masters of the Universe (2021–2022)
- Television special: He-Man & She-Ra: A Christmas Special (1985)

Games
- Role-playing: FASA – The Masters of the Universe Role Playing Game (1985)
- Video games: Masters of the Universe: The Power of He-Man (1983); Masters of the Universe: The Super Adventure (1986); Masters of the Universe: The Arcade Game (1987); Masters of the Universe: The Movie (1987); He-Man: Power of Grayskull (2002); He-Man: Defender of Grayskull (2005); He-Man: The Most Powerful Game in the Universe (2012); He-Man: Tappers of Grayskull (2016); Masters of the Universe™: Legends Unite (2026)

Audio
- Soundtrack: Masters of the Universe (2026)
- Audio plays: MOTU & POP – Europa German Audio Cassettes (1984–1988); MOTU & POP – Kid Stuff Books, Tapes and Records (1983–1987); Masters of the Universe – John Braden LP (1983)

Miscellaneous
- Toys: Masters of the Universe (original toyline) (1982–1988); Princess of Power (1985–1987); He-Man (1989–1992); Masters of the Universe (modern toyline) (2002–2007); She-Ra and the Princesses of Power (Mattel toyline) (2019); Masters of the Universe Classics & Super7 (2008–2020); Masters of the Universe Origins (2020–present); Masters of the Universe Masterverse (2021–present)

Official website
- mattel.com/mastersoftheuniverse

Masters of the Universe (sometimes referred to as He-Man or She-Ra, or under the acronym MOTU) is an American sword and planet media franchise created by Mattel. The main premise revolves around the conflict between He-Man and Skeletor on the planet Eternia, with a vast lineup of supporting characters in a hybrid setting of medieval sword and sorcery, and sci-fi technology. A spinoff series revolves around He-Man's sister She-Ra and her rebellion against The Horde on the planet Etheria. Since its initial launch, the franchise has spawned a variety of products, including multiple lines of action figures, seven animated television series, several comic series, video games, books, magazines, a daily newspaper comic strip, and three feature films.

== Series overview and main characters ==
Mattel released the original "Masters of the Universe" 5.5-inch action-figure toy line in 1982. The series mythos began through the mini-comics that came packaged with the toys throughout the 1980s. These initial mini-comics were soon followed by serial comic books published by DC Comics. However, the setting and cast of characters became best known through Filmation's animated series He-Man and the Masters of the Universe, which debuted in the fall of 1983 and ran for 130 episodes over two seasons until December 1984.

Masters of the Universe has usually focused on two primary characters, the blond muscular He-Man, "the most powerful man in the universe", and his nemesis, the evil skull-faced, blue-skinned sorcerer Skeletor, and their many moral-themed encounters on the planet Eternia. Set in a hybrid science fantasy world, He-Man battles with Skeletor to prevent him from conquering Eternia and discovering the secrets of Castle Grayskull, a mysterious ancient fortress with a skull-shaped facade, containing great power and magic.

As with many toy franchises that have been transferred to several different media, there are a number of story differences between the various versions of Masters of the Universe. In most continuities from the Filmation series onward, He-Man is the secret identity of Prince Adam, the son of the ruling royal family of Eternia, King Randor and Queen Marlena (a displaced astronaut from Earth). Adam becomes He-Man by holding aloft his magic Power Sword and uttering the words "By the power of Grayskull... I have the power!" and serves as the protector of good on Eternia. He is first given this ability by the Sorceress of Castle Grayskull, a powerful magic user and mystic guardian of the castle, who in many depictions is able to transform herself into the falcon Zoar. Upon Adam's transformation into He-Man, his cowardly green pet tiger Cringer becomes the mighty Battle Cat, a giant armored feline that He-Man often rides into battle.

He-Man's most prominent allies include Man-At-Arms, a mentor, veteran soldier and inventor, and Man-At-Arms' adopted daughter Teela, a spirited and skillful female warrior, often portrayed as captain of the Eternian Royal Guard and a potential love interest of He-Man/Prince Adam. The childlike magician Orko also often features as one of He-Man's closest allies; while other key recurring heroic characters include Stratos, a flying bird-man from the kingdom of Avion, Ram-Man, a stout warrior with springlike legs and a large helmet that encloses his head and upper torso, and Man-E-Faces, an actor with face-changing abilities.

Skeletor is originally described as an evil sorcerer from another dimension and in some later MOTU lore as a disfigured and vengeful relative of the royal family, known as Keldor. From his lair on Snake Mountain, Skeletor commands his "Evil Warriors" to assist in his various schemes to conquer Eternia. These core minions usually include Beast Man, an orange-furred, apelike master of beasts, Mer-Man, an aquatic fishlike ocean warlord, Trap Jaw, an iron-jawed criminal with a mechanical arm that fits an assortment of weapons, Tri-Klops, a mercenary swordsman with a rotating three-eyed visor, and the powerful sorceress Evil-Lyn, one of Skeletor's most feared and competent associates.

The series overall would feature a wide and ever-expanding cast of heroic and villainous characters added to the toy line, the Filmation cartoon, and other media; with the franchise far outshining expectations, continuing to grow through 1983 and 1984.

The release of the animated cartoon movie He-Man and She-Ra: The Secret of the Sword in the spring of 1985 introduced He-Man's twin sister She-Ra, with the accompanying female-focused Princess of Power toy line, which was followed by the She-Ra: Princess of Power animated series that fall. With an inverse power-dynamic from that on Eternia, She-Ra, with her secret alter ego Princess Adora, would join the 'Great Rebellion' to save the oppressed people of Etheria from the ruling Evil Horde.

Stemming from the animated movie, Filmation went on to produce 93 episodes of the series She-Ra: Princess of Power, which ran until the end of 1987, along with the He-Man & She-Ra: Christmas Special. Some of the other main characters of the She-Ra mythos include Glimmer, the magically inclined leader of the Great Rebellion, Bow, a skilled archer and the main male protagonist of the series, and Swift Wind, a winged unicorn and alter ego of She-Ra's trusty steed Spirit. They would fight to free Etheria from the Horde, led by the arch-villain Hordak (the former mentor of Skeletor), and his often featured henchwomen, the cloaked witch Shadow Weaver and the Force Squad captain Catra, amongst many other members of the Horde.

Various He-Man and She-Ra related children's books, magazines, read-along records/cassette tapes, audio adventures, and other merchandise were released globally in multiple countries and languages in the 1980s. The later mini-comics, newspaper strip, Marvel's Star comics, and the UK magazine comics continued the adventures of He-Man and She-Ra past the end of the two Filmation animated series.

The live-action film Masters of the Universe was released in 1987 by Cannon Films, starring Dolph Lundgren and Frank Langella. The film reimagines aspects of the series, with additional toys and comic book releases tying in to the movie and some of its new characters.

Popularity had waned by the end of 1987 and a planned continuation of the original toy line under the heading of "The Powers of Grayskull" was started, but eventually scrapped. The series was to be set in ancient Eternia (Preternia) featuring King Hiss, the villainous leader of the Snake Men (a faction introduced in the later stages of the toyline), and He-Man's heroic magic-wielding ancestor, He-Ro.

He-Man was brought back in 1989 in a space-based cartoon series and toy line known as "The New Adventures of He-Man". Only He-Man and Skeletor returned as major characters to join the battle between Galactic Guardians and Space Mutants on the planet Primus. Jetlag Productions produced 65 episodes of the New Adventures cartoon, with a few mini comics and adventure magazines also created for this new series. Ultimately, the series was not as successful and the franchise went on a hiatus for more than a decade.

After some success with a "Commemorative Series" rerelease of the classic action figures in 2000, Mattel relaunched the toy line with all-new action figures, playsets, and vehicles, sculpted by Four Horsemen Studios in 2002. As part of the relaunch, a new animated series was also created by Mike Young Productions, featuring He-Man and his ensemble of heroic warriors, now called the "Masters of the Universe", battling Skeletor's minions, and later King Hiss, the ancient evil lord of the Snake Men, in season two. Characters such as Mekaneck, Buzz-Off, Roboto, Fisto, Moss Man, Clawful, Whiplash, Two-Bad, Stinkor and several others would have more prominence and gain more elaborate backstories during the series over its 39 episodes. Several volumes of comic books were also produced to go along with the series by Image Comics and MVCreations. Although popular with longtime fans and collectors, the new series failed to catch on with a larger audience and was canceled in 2004.

From 2008 to 2020, Mattel released a new assortment of Masters of the Universe action figures under the title "Masters of the Universe Classics" primarily geared toward the collector's market. The accompanying mini-comics and packaging biographies progressed and added many new elements to the Masters of the Universe lore, featuring themes and characters from all previous incarnations. In 2016 the MOTU Classics toyline was transitioned to the toy manufacturer, Super7, which was eventually superseded by Mattel's own "Masters of the Universe Origins" toyline, from 2019 to the present. During this time, DC Comics relaunched various new, grittier Masters of the Universe comic book series from 2012 until 2020. The comics included crossovers with the DC Comics Universe and ThunderCats.

Netflix and DreamWorks produced an animated series titled She-Ra and the Princesses of Power in 2018, which released five seasons until 2020. The series rebooted the She-Ra Princess of Power franchise with a new anime-inspired art style, a new origin story and an increased focus on the complex relationship between Adora (She-Ra) and Catra.

In 2021 Netflix released a reimagined He-Man and the Masters of the Universe series aimed at a younger audience and using CGI animation. Developed by Rob David, the series featured an updated storyline and a new stylized take on the characters and the world of Eternia. It ran for three seasons from September 2021 to August 2022, and was accompanied by a toyline from Mattel.

Another more adult-orientated animated series was also released by Netflix in 2021, titled Masters of the Universe: Revelation, produced by Kevin Smith, as well as a sequel series, Masters of the Universe: Revolution, in 2024. To go along with the Revelation series on Netflix, the comic book license was picked up by Dark Horse Comics in 2021, debuting with a comic series of the same name. Dark Horse continues to produce Masters of the Universe comics, including a crossover with the Teenage Mutant Ninja Turtles. Also in conjunction with the Netflix series, Mattel produced a new line of premium Masters of the Universe Masterverse action figures.

After years of production issues, a second live-action Masters of the Universe movie was theatrically released on June 5, 2026, directed by Travis Knight for Amazon MGM and starring Nicholas Galitzine as He-Man. The film became available for streaming on July 22, while a related animated web series was released on June 19, 2026, as well as new lines of action figures and movie-related comics.

== History of the franchise: Origin and the 1980s ==
=== Creation of the MOTU franchise ===
Mattel began development of He-Man and the Masters of the Universe in the late 1970s with concepts from Roger Sweet, Mark Taylor, Donald F. Glut, and several other contributors. The catalyst for the creation of He-Man began in 1976, when Mattel's CEO Ray Wagner declined a request to produce a toy line of action figures based on George Lucas's upcoming Star Wars film, with the rights acquired by Kenner instead to massive commercial success. Undeterred, Wagner began a push to develop the next great toy line. (Note: Attempted toy lines included: Kid Gallant, a medieval knight; Robin and the Space Hoods, a sci-fi figure; and the daredevil Kenny Dewitt, pronounced "Can He Do It?")

Roger Sweet, a lead designer working for Mattel's Preliminary Design Department through much of the 1970s and 1980s, according to his book Mastering the Universe: He-Man and the Rise and Fall of a Billion-Dollar Idea, was the first to conceptualize the idea of He-Man. However, authorship of the He-Man character has often been subject to debate. (Note: The general consensus among the fandom is that it was the collaborative efforts of many designers and artists (including Mark Taylor, Roger Sweet, Anthony G. Guerrero, Ted Mayer, Tom Kalinske, and others) that inspired and produced the original toys.) According to various former Mattel designers, Roger Sweet drew inspiration for the designs of his first He-Man prototypes from the fantasy drawings of Mattel packaging designer Mark Taylor, which included a drawing of a He-Man-like character called "Torak – Hero of Pre-History".

As the He-Man concept progressed, Roger Sweet presented three plaster prototype models to Ray Wagner at the Mattel Product Conference in 1980. Dubbed the "He-Man Trio", they consisted of an axe-wielding barbarian, a tank-headed soldier, and a spaceman with a Boba Fett–like helmet. They were molded from modified Big Jim action figures (Battle Cat was also later repurposed from the same toy line's "Big Jim on the Tiger Trail" set). Out of the three concepts, the barbarian version of He-Man was chosen to be the basis of the toy line. (Note: This trio was actually produced in action figure form in the Masters of the Universe Classics toy line in 2012, and given the names 'Vykron', 'Space Ace' and 'Tank Top'.)

"The only way I was going to have a chance to sell this [to Wagner] was to make three 3D models—big ones. I glued a Big Jim figure [from another Mattel toy line] into a battle action pose and I added a lot of clay to his body. I then had plaster casts made. These three prototypes, which I presented in late 1980, brought He-Man into existence. I simply explained that this was a powerful figure that could be taken anywhere and dropped into any context because he had a generic name: He-Man!" —Roger Sweet (Note: Other names considered by the design team were Mighty Man, Megaton Man, Strong Man and Big Man.)

Based on Sweet's prototype, the first production sculpt of the original He-Man was completed by Tony Guerrero, though not yet at the figure's final stage, as this early version of He-Man sported a horned Viking helmet. (Note: This helmeted prototype was later given the name 'Vikor' and produced as its own action figure and distinct character in the Masters of the Universe Classics toy line in 2011) With these overtly barbarian-like features, the properties' influence from Conan the Barbarian is often cited. He-Man co-creator Roger Sweet has stated that he drew at least some inspiration from the paintings of fantasy artist Frank Frazetta, whose catalogue includes many works depicting Conan the Barbarian. In 1980, the rights-holders of Conan the Barbarian had been negotiating with Mattel regarding a toy line for the 1982 Conan movie. However, with Mattel introducing the Masters of the Universe toy line also in 1982, the rights-holders unsuccessfully sued Mattel claiming that the He-Man character was an infringement on that of Conan. So although some influence exists, the Masters of the Universe toy line was never intended for the Conan film.

Under the working title "Lords of Power", further development saw the roster of characters expand past the barbarian version of He-Man to include concepts for Skeletor, Man-At-Arms, Beast Man and Castle Grayskull. These and several other characters were created using the preliminary designs and ideas of artist Mark Taylor. Taylor drew inspiration for the series main villain, Skeletor, from his 1971 sketch titled The King of Styx, and not from his 1980 Demo-Man sketch as often cited. (Note: Demo-Man was later produced as an action figure and incorporated into Skeletor's origin story in 2011 for the Masters of the Universe Classics line. However Mark Taylor later refuted the character's connection to Skeletor himself in an 2016 interview.) Inspiration for Man-At-Arms came from Taylor's Paladin sketch, originally done for the unproduced "Rob-N & The Space Hoods" toy line. (Note: Another sketch utilized by Mark Taylor was that of his Red Beast, which was used for Beast Man (while also taking inspiration from the Big Jim toy line's Gorilla figure). Beast Man was for a time in consideration to be the main villain of the series.) Additional direction towards these early concepts was provided by Mark Ellis, Paul Cleveland, and Derek Gable, among others, with the first vehicle designs provided by Ted Mayer. The toy line's original name "Lords of Power", was changed to "Masters of the Universe" when it was suggested that the former name was too religious in nature (the working name "Fighting Foe Men" was also in consideration for a time). However, even with the finalized Masters of the Universe name and the character designs in hand, the premise behind the toy line had not yet been fully established.

The backstory of He-Man was first conceptualized for special mini-comic books that Mattel marketing director Mark Ellis promised to distributors would accompany the toys. Mattel quickly mocked up the pack-in comic books, with the earliest mini-comic storybooks written in 1981 by Donald F. Glut. In them, He-Man is depicted as a warrior departing his jungle tribe on Eternia, who is recognized by the Sorceress as the hero destined to wield ancient armour and weapons; which he then uses to stop Skeletor from taking control of Castle Grayskull by uniting both halves of the Power Sword.

This basic premise and cast of characters was expanded upon in the follow-up series of mini-comics written by Gary Cohn. However, it was in DC Comics, with He-Man's (standard-sized) debut comic set for release in the spring of 1982, that many of the franchise's most enduring elements would take shape. (Note: He-Man's debut comic story would be titled "From Eternia with Death!" in DC Comics Presents #47, with a cover date of July 1982, arriving on newsstands on April 8, 1982.) Written by Paul Kupperberg, stemming from his meeting with Mattel representative Mark Ellis and project editor Dave Manak, DC Comics would introduce Prince Adam and his transformation into He-Man, as well as Cringer transforming into Battle Cat. (Note: Paul Kupperberg does state however, in a 2010 interview that the concept of the Prince Adam/He-Man dichotomy was already established prior to his meeting with Ellis and Manak.)

However, not all were on board with the push towards comic books, as major distributor, Toys "R" Us, was concerned that young children would either not be able (or not be interested) to read the comics. To counter this Mark Ellis proposed the idea of an animated TV special, which eventually led to a meeting with the head of Filmation Lou Scheimer and the creation of the He-Man and the Masters of the Universe animated series. The idea of a cartoon series promoting a children's toy line had only recently become an option. In 1981, the Reagan administration deregulated and eased the FCC's restrictions on children’s television advertising, allowing animation studios and toy manufacturers to collaborate on cartoons specifically designed to promote toys. This opened the door to one of the biggest shifts in the toy and animation industries in the 1980s, and set the stage for what would be Filmation's most successful series and Mattel's biggest hit of the decade.

Now that work was underway in the lead up to the Filmation cartoon, a series bible was created by author Michael Halperin, which explored the geography of Eternia, the origin of Prince Adam becoming He-Man, the creation of Castle Grayskull and backstories to several other characters. Though providing a solid foundation, some elements of Halperin's bible were not used, and the series bible was later reworked by Robby London and Tom Ruegger, prior to London's writing of the animated series' pilot episode "The Diamond Ray of Disappearance". (Note: Largely unused concepts from Michael Halperin's series bible included Evil-Lyn, Beast Man and Tri-Klops originally being ship-mates of Earth Astronaut Marlena Glenn (Adam/He-Man's mother), before being transformed into evil minions of Skeletor. This idea would only be explored once in a 'Golden Heroic Champions' children's book entitled "New Champions of Eternia". Other elements from Halperin's series bible such as Grayskull's origin as the 'Hall of Wisdom', and Infinita (as a dark opposing planet to Eternia and home to Skeletor), were not widely used, but did appear in some early audio and books by Kid Stuff Records.)

By the end of 1981 and into 1982 with the initial wave of action figures, vehicles and the Castle Grayskull playset in production, the mini-comics ready to be packaged with the toys, the DC comic soon to be released, and the animated Filmation series in the works; Masters of the Universe was ready to make its debut on February 17, 1982 at the American International Toy Fair in New York City, and on retail toy shelves shortly thereafter.

=== Beginning of the Masters of the Universe toy line ===
==== The first action figures, mini-comics and commercials (1981–1982) ====
The Masters of the Universe franchise debuted with the Masters of the Universe toy line that was produced by Mattel in 1981, and was first released to stores in the spring of 1982 as 5½-inch action figures (as opposed to the 3¾-inch size used by other action figure lines at the time). (Note: The 3¾-inch size used by Kenner's Star Wars and Hasbro's G.I. Joe: A Real American Hero action figure lines had become a popular standard size in the early 1980s.) As a major part of the 1980s action-figure boom, Masters of the Universe proved to be very popular, with millions of toys produced and marketed all over the world, and generating over $2 billion in retail sales during its' original run. (Note: Most of the action figures were made in Taiwan and later in Malaysia. However, Mattel also had production facilities in the United States, Mexico, Hong Kong, Italy, France and Spain, and joint ventures with Leo Toys of India, Top Toys of Argentina, Estrela of Brazil, Rotoplast of Venezuela and Takara of Japan.)

Waves of action figures, creatures, vehicles, and playsets were released every year from 1982 until 1987, with the final overseas releases from the original toy line coming from Europe in 1988. (Note: In total, 70 distinct action figures were made, as well as 22 creatures, 2 giants, 14 vehicles, 6 playsets, and 12 accessories.) Each figure would be given a tagline for marketing and packaging on their distinctive blister cards with artwork featuring exploding red rocks with a blue 'Masters of the Universe' logo. (Note: The card art was designed by Bob Nall, in conjunction with Mark Taylor, with the final illustration and logo created by John Hamagami. This look would carry-on throughout the entire vintage line, while card-back of the initial wave would feature a simple illustrated cross-sell of the first eight action figures, but would add additional figures and elements in successive waves.)

The main hero of the line, the "most powerful man in the universe" He-Man, and his evil arch-enemy the "lord of destruction" Skeletor, were the first released in action figure form along with He-Man's main ally, the "master of weapons" Man-At-Arms, and Skeletor's "savage henchman" Beast Man. The first creature in the line, He-Man's green "fighting tiger" Battle Cat was also among the initial releases. (Note: Battle Cat came with a removable mask and saddle armour that "carries He-Man into battle" and was also released as a two-pack with the original He-Man action figure. Both boxed packages featured artwork by Rudy Obrero.)

The second half of the first wave of action figures in 1982 would include the heroic "warrior goddess" Teela, (Note: The only female figure of the first wave, the Teela action figure was originally proposed as representing both the "Goddess" /Sorceress character (when wearing the figure's snake armor) and the "warrior" Teela character (when without the snake armor), as Mattel believed there would not be enough demand for two female action figures in the initial wave.) the heroic "winged warrior" Stratos, the evil "ocean warlord" Mer-Man and the ambiguously aligned "cosmic enforcer" Zodac. (Note: Featured less often than the other characters in the first wave, Zodac was originally listed as an evil character; but would later be portrayed as being neutral within the Masters of the Universe canon. However, Zodac was more often aligned with He-Man and the forces of good in most media, rather than Skeletor and his Evil Warriors.) The original action figures all had six points of articulation, with reuse of existing figure molds (primarily arms, legs and torsos) quite common throughout the duration of the line. Each of the initial eight figures were given an action-feature, in which the waist of the figure could be twisted to release a spring-loaded 'power punch'. (Note: Many of the elements of these original eight action figures would continue throughout the line: the parts re-use, removable weapons and armour, articulation, rubber heads, rubber connectors used to secure the legs and the 'power punch' action feature would all be commonly found in future waves of figures. However new tooling and a bigger emphasis on new and unique action features would become far more prevalent.) Figures were also packaged with unique plastic weapons and armour accessories; with the original He-Man and Skeletor each given one half of the Sword of Power, which could be fit together to form a "key" to open the jawbridge of Castle Grayskull. (Note: The two halves of the Power Sword combining to enter Castle Grayskull was originally planned as a significant part of Masters of the Universe lore, but was dropped early on.)

Alongside the first wave of figures were the Battle Ram and Wind Raider vehicles and the aforementioned "fortress of power and mystery" Castle Grayskull playset, the biggest and most expensive item in the early years of the toy line. (Note: The Battle Ram was described as a "mobile launcher" and featured a wheeled missile-firing vehicle as well as a detachable 'Sky sled'. The Wind Raider, a flying "assault lander" vehicle, used by the Heroic Warriors, featured a grappling hook and winch. The Wind Raider was also made available in a two-pack with He-Man.) These first larger boxed items featured packaging art by Rudy Obrero. (Note: Later packaging illustration would also feature the work of William Garland, William George, Errol McCarthy, Joe Chiodo, Warren Hile, Dave Stevens and Bruce Timm.)

The lore of Masters of the Universe was first explored through the mini-comics that accompanied the action figures. The original four mini-comics, "He-Man and the Power Sword", "The King of Castle Grayskull", "Battle in the Clouds", and "The Vengeance of Skeletor" were created by Mattel in 1981 (written by Donald F. Glut, with artwork by Alfredo Alcala), and featured a story-book style and continuity distinct from the rest of the series. New mini-comics would continue to accompany subsequent figures throughout the duration of the line, with 49 distinct comics issued from 1981 until 1987.

In the first mini-comic, "He-man and the Power Sword", He-Man is introduced as a wandering barbarian, who leaves behind his jungle tribe on Eternia and is given special armour and weapons by the Sorceress. (Note: The Sorceress is depicted with green skin in her debut appearance and in this and other early appearances, the character is often shown wearing the snake-armor that came with the Teela action figure (instead of her later, more familiar falcon-inspired attire). This "green" Sorceress would later become a separate character, known as the "Goddess" in the Masters of the Universe Classics line in 2009.) The world of Eternia is initially depicted as dealing with the aftermath of a great war, the events of which have opened a rift between dimensions, allowing the evil warlord Skeletor to travel to Eternia. This inaugural incarnation of Skeletor sets his sights on obtaining both halves of the Power Sword (originally split in two in these early mini-comics), in order to gain entry into Castle Grayskull (which is inhabited by the ghostly Spirit of Castle Grayskull).

He-Man (not yet with the dual identity of Prince Adam) is supported in these initial mini-comic stories by his heroic allies: Battle Cat (without the dual form of Cringer), Man-At-Arms (depicted as clean-shaven, like his original action figure), Teela (with either blonde or red hair, and often accompanied by a unicorn charger), and Stratos (who is erroneously shown on the side of evil in the first mini-comic). To battle He-Man and his heroic warriors, Skeletor, in turn enlists the help of the Beast Man (with all red fur, rather than the later orange colouring) and Mer-Man (looking decidedly different than his action figure in head sculpt and in some of his attire). (Note: Despite being one of the original eight figures released in the first wave, the character Zodac would not appear in these, or any of the standard 49 mini-comics released in the original toy line.)

Television commercials for the Masters of the Universe collection also began airing in 1982, often featuring children playing with the action figures and Castle Grayskull playset in-front of an adult father. One early commercial featured a distinct animated segment by Filmation, prior to the release of the cartoon series in 1983, with many of the later series' voice cast present.

==== DC Comics – 1980s series (1982–1983) ====
To support the new toy line, He-Man and the Masters of the Universe would make an early appearance in the July, 1982 issue of DC Comics Presents #47, in the story "From Eternia With Death", followed by a special insert comic, titled "Fate is the Killer", in many of DC's titles with a cover date of November 1982. (Note: DC Comics Presents #47 had a cover date of July 1982, but was actually available on newsstands on April 8, 1982. The special insert follow-up story "Fate is the Killer", that was released in 16 different DC Comics titles dated November 1982, actually hit newsstands primarily in August 1982 (the earliest issue containing the insert was "The Daring New Adventures of Supergirl" #1, which was released on July 20, 1982).) In these first two DC MOTU stories, Superman ends up on Eternia, teaming up with He-Man to combat Skeletor and his minions. He-Man's original DC comic run finished up with a three-issue miniseries, dated from December 1982 to February 1983 (the miniseries and the two preceding stories were all written by Paul Kupperberg). (Note: Actual release dates of the three issues of the DC Comics Masters of the Universe miniseries were in August, September and October 1982. Artwork (pencils) on the miniseries was provided by George Tuska, while the previous two books included artwork from Curt Swan and Dave Hunt.)

These issues expanded and laid the foundation for much of the lore of Masters of the Universe, most notably the Eternian Royal Family, which introduced Prince Adam and his transformation into He-Man into the series. This version of Adam was depicted wearing a blue vest and portrayed as a carefree philanderer, rather than his later more wholesome and clumsy pink-vest-wearing character. Unique to these issues, Adam transforms inside the "Cavern of Power" (instead of raising his sword in-front of the more familiar Castle Grayskull), and the Sorceress (still depicted wearing the snake armor from the Teela action figure) is often referred to as "The Goddess" throughout the series. Man-E-Faces and the falcon Zoar are also introduced in the miniseries, though Zoar is not yet an alternate form of the Sorceress. Other entries into the Masters of the Universe mythos introduced in these early DC comics are Cringer as the alter ego of Battle Cat (and with the ability to speak), Teela as the daughter of Man-At-Arms (though not yet as the adopted-daughter), Stratos as the leader of the Bird-people of Avion, Zodac as a neutral overseer riding through the cosmos on his flying chair, and Adam's mother, Queen Marlena, as an astronaut hailing from Earth. (Note: Writer Paul Kupperberg developed many of these additions to the Masters of the Universe lore during multiple conferences with DC project editor Dave Manak and Mattel's Mark Ellis.)

==== Second wave of action figures and mini-comics (1983) ====
By 1983 the popularity of the franchise was growing, with new characters introduced in the second wave of Mattel's Masters of the Universe toy line. Many of these new figures had more emphasis on unique and more elaborate action features than the first wave. These would include He-Man's allies, the "heroic human battering ram" Ram Man, with spring-loaded legs, and Man-E-Faces with three "human...robot...monster" faces, changed by rotating a dial on the figure's head.

Skeletor's Evil Warriors would also gain reinforcements with Tri-Klops, a swordsman with a three-eyed rotating visor, who was described on his packaging as "evil & sees everything", and Trap Jaw, "evil & armed for combat" with alternate weapons to place in his arm socket and a movable serrated jaw. Later in the second wave they would be joined by the "evil warrior goddess" Evil-Lyn, and Faker, the "evil robot of Skeletor", who was a blue-skinned clone of He-Man (re-using the same mold). (Note: Both Evil-Lyn and Faker would retain the spring-loaded waist "Power Punch" feature from the first wave of figures, with no new action features added. The figures would also differ from their later depictions, as neither the yellow-tone of the Evil-Lyn figure or the blue colour of Faker would carry over into Filmation. As the final two figures released late in 1983, both characters would fail to appear in the associated second wave of mini-comics.) The packaging of the action figures would now feature card-backs with captions and illustrated scenes by artist Errol McCarthy unique to each character, as well as details on each figure's action feature and up to twelve additional cross-sell action figures displayed. This format would become the standard until the end of the toy line.

In addition, three 'creatures' also joined the toy line in 1983, with the "fighting falcon" Zoar and Skeletor's "barbarian bird" Screeech, a purple recast of Zoar. (Note: Both Zoar and Screeech utilized a pre-existing bald eagle mold taken from the Big Jim toyline's "Eagle of Danger Peak" set.) Notably Skeletor would also gain his feline mount with Panthor the "savage cat", an adaptation of Battle Cat's toy mold with flocked purple fur. (Note: Various two-packs combining Zoar, Screeech and Panthor with action figures were also made available as gift sets during this wave, as were three-pack sets of action figures for both the Heroic and Evil Warriors. Box art for the larger items in this wave such as these creatures, the gift sets and the vehicles/playset were illustrated by William Garland and once again by Rudy Obrero.) Also released in this second wave were the Attak-Trak motorized "battle machine" vehicle, and the Point Dread & Talon Fighter playset, which included both the Talon Fighter vehicle and the small Point Dread "frontier outpost" playset, part of which could be attached to Castle Grayskull. (Note: The Point Dread & Talon Fighter playset also came with a vinyl record and a larger-sized comic-style book titled "The Power of Point Dread/Danger at Castle Grayskull".)

Seven new mini-comics were produced by DC Comics for the second wave of MOTU figures, which were written by Gary Cohn, with artwork by Mark Texeira, and presented in true comic book style, rather than the story-book format of the previous mini-comics. (Note: These mini-comics were "He-Man Meets Ram-Man", "The Ordeal of Man-E-Faces", "The Terror of Tri-Klops", "The Menace of Trap Jaw", "The Magic Stealer", "The Power of... Point Dread", and "The Tale of Teela".) This new batch would continue some of the same continuity that was set in the first four mini-comics, and provide introductions to the new action figure characters such as Ram-Man, Tri-Klops, Man-E-Faces, Trap Jaw and Zoar (though their depictions were in line with earlier design concepts and differed from their final production figures and the later Filmation look of the characters). King Randor and Queen Marlena would appear in these pre-Filmation stories, but the comics still did not feature the prominent characters of Prince Adam, Cringer, Orko, and Evil-Lyn. (Note: Many of the characters were not yet depicted in their more familiar forms: Randor and Marlena both looked far older than they would in the forthcoming Filmation cartoon, Teela retained her blonde hair, and Man-At-Arms was still without facial hair. The Sorceress remained in snake-armour attire in this second wave of mini-comics and was presented as a separate character from that of the falcon Zoar. She was also often shown outside of Castle Grayskull while still in human form; something she would not often do in the Filmation series or later comics.) However, the concept of Teela as the secret daughter of the Sorceress, and now the adopted daughter of Man-At-Arms was first introduced at this time in the mini-comic "The Tale of Teela". (Note: "The Tale of Teela" mini comic, provides a backstory to Teela as a "magically cloned" daughter of the Sorceress (referred to as the Goddess throughout the story), created by Skeletor and adopted by Man-At-Arms. Though introducing the concept of a special connection between the Sorceress and Teela, the clone backstory was never mentioned again, and the primary idea seems to have been to explain the intended dual-action figure nature of the "Warrior Goddess" Teela figure.)

It has also been discovered that a "Special Edition" He-Man action figure was offered through a "buy-3-get-one-free" mail offer in limited quantities in 1983. (Note: This "Special Edition" He-Man was later adapted into a character known as Wun-Dar, in the Masters of the Universe Classics toy line in 2010, as well as the Masters of the Universe Revelation series in 2021.) The figure was a repaint of the original He-Man figure with brown hair, darker tights, black boots and belt, with or without a seemingly random assortment of maroon-coloured weapons. (Note: The maroon coloured weapons were recoloured from an assortment of weapons that were originally included with Castle Grayskull and could also be found packaged with early releases of Man-E-Faces (dubbed by fans as "Man-E-Weapons").) Also known as "Savage He-Man" and erroneously as "Wonder Bread He-Man", the origins of the figure have long been subject to debate. (Note: The figure was originally thought to have been offered through a promotion from Wonder Bread (instigating the nickname "Wonder Bread" He-Man), which was actually a promotion for Masters of the Universe trading cards in 1986. Other theories included an early Conan the Barbarian figure, a Buzz-Off prototype, or early Prince Adam and Faker figures; but the "buy-3-get-one-free" offer has become the most widely accepted origin.)

=== Peak MOTU: the Filmation animated series era ===
==== He-Man and the Masters of the Universe – Filmation animated series (1983–1984) ====
Masters of the Universe was off to great start, and by the fall of 1983, the franchise was about to enter its' most successful era with the launch of the animated series He-Man and the Masters of the Universe. Created by Filmation, under the direction of executive producer Lou Scheimer (along with Hal Sutherland and Arthur Nadel), the series made its' television debut on September 5, 1983, with the episode "The Diamond Ray of Disappearance". He-Man and the Masters of the Universe was one of the first animated series produced directly for weekday syndication, as opposed to reruns primarily based on Saturday mornings. The series was a resounding success, one of the most popular children's cartoons of the 1980s, drawing as much as 10 million viewers per episode in the United States, with an addition 7 million in the United Kingdom. He-Man and the Masters of the Universe would run two seasons, totalling 130 episodes, from September 1983 to December 1984, airing in 37 countries worldwide. (Note: Each season of 65 episodes stretched across 13 weeks from September to December in both 1983 and 1984.)

The series is set on Eternia, which is ruled by King Randor, (voiced by Lou Schiemer) from the Royal Palace in the capital city of Eternos, with his wife Queen Marlena (astronaut Marlena Glenn from Earth) and their son, Prince Adam (voiced, along with He-Man, by John Erwin). Prince Adam (now depicted in his familiar pink vest), attempts to disguise his secret identity as He-Man, by pretending to be somewhat lazy and irresponsible. As he narrates the introductory title sequence, Adam is shown transforming into He-Man by holding aloft his magic sword and saying the words, "By the power of Grayskull... I have the power!!!" for the first time; as well as transforming his cowardly pet tiger Cringer into the mighty Battle Cat (as voiced by Allen Oppenheimer).

In the same introductory sequence, it is revealed that He-Man's secret is known only by three others: the Sorceress of Castle Grayskull (voiced by Linda Gary), now adorned in the more familiar birdlike costume, and taking the form of Zoar the falcon when outside the castle; Man-At-Arms (voiced by Allen Oppenheimer and now sporting a moustache), is portrayed as a scientific inventor, veteran warrior and mentor to Adam; and Orko (voiced by Lou Scheimer), making his debut as a mainstay in the franchise, is presented as a floating childlike Trollan magician, who is often used for comic relief and as a point-of-view character for children.

Rounding out the main cast of heroes is Teela, the Captain of the Royal Guard, the adopted daughter of Man-At-Arms, and unbeknownst to her, the secret child of the Sorceress. Teela (voiced by Linda Gary) is not privy to He-Man's true identity and serves as a competitive and semi-antagonistic potential love interest of Adam/He-Man. (Note: In Filmation Teela is only ever depicted with red hair and is never seen wearing the snake armor that came with her action figure.) Other heroic allies featured with some frequency are Stratos (the flying leader of the Bird-people of Avion, voiced by Lou Scheimer) and Ram-Man (portrayed by John Erwin as a dim-witted, but likable stout bouncing warrior).

He-Man's arch-nemesis, the evil wizard Skeletor (in his most iconic portrayal as a shrill, cackling and more comedic villain by voice actor Alan Oppenheimer), continues in his quest to conquer Castle Grayskull, learn of its secrets, and his desire to take over and rule all of Eternia. Skeletor often hosts his rogues gallery inside his headquarters, Snake Mountain, gathered around his throne of bones and peering through a magic crystal orb to spy on He-Man and his allies. Skeletor's malevolent plots to conquer Eternia or enter Grayskull often include summoning the help of monstrous beasts and obtaining powerful magic artifacts. Skeletor's main henchmen often consist of the dangerous magic-user Evil-Lyn (voiced by Linda Gary), making her entrance into the MOTU mythos as Skeletor's most capable counterpart; the bumbling Beast Man (voiced by John Erwin), who possesses the ability to control various creatures through telepathy; and the equally inept Trap Jaw (voiced by Lou Scheimer), who retains his arsenal of weapons that fit into his arm-socket. Skeletor's other original minions in the cartoon also include Mer-Man (with a distinctive gurgling voice portrayal by Alan Oppenheimer), Tri-Klops (with a robotic voice provided by Lou Scheimer), and Skeletor's purple pet feline Panthor. (Note: Some of Skeletor's Evil Warriors would appear only once in the Filmation cartoon, such as Faker (created by Skeletor as a magical clone of He-Man, before being tossed into the bottomless abyss outside Castle Grayskull), Jitsu (known as "Chopper" in the script), Dragoon, Fang Man, Strongarm and Icer (the only "one-off" henchman of season two).)

Joining Skeletor's Evil Warriors and making several appearances later in the series are the cunning and crab-like Clawful, the reptilian Whiplash, the spider-like Webstor, and the Snakeman Kobra Khan. (Note: These henchmen would often be portrayed as more competent than some of Skeletor's earlier, more inept minions. Clawful (voiced by Lou Scheimer) debuts at the end of season one, and is portrayed in the Filmation series with quite a different look and personality than his action figure and other incarnations of the character. Whiplash would appear more frequently than all later additions to Skeletor's roster and was voiced by John Erwin. The stealthy Webstor was also voiced by Erwin, and often formed a menacing duo with Kobra Khan (also voiced by Lou Scheimer), who is able to spray sleeping gas from his cobra-like hood.) Closer to the end of the second season, Skeletor would add additional villains to his ranks, such as Two-Bad, with his two often arguing heads, the dimwitted Spikor, and the scientist Modulok. (Note: All three villains were voiced by Lou Scheimer. Modulok's origin story as a scientist named Galen Nycroft is explored in the episode "Mistaken Identity", mutated into a two-headed monster-like being, he is rarely shown with his second head. Modulok would defect to the Evil Horde in the later She-Ra: Princess of Power episode "Gateway to Trouble".) Other villains not allied with Skeletor would appear throughout the series as well, such as the powerful wizard Count Marzo, the plant-demon Evilseed, the clever Batros, the turban-wearing Kothos, the haunting Shokoti, and the rabbit-like space pirate Plundor. (Note: Though none received action figures in the original toy line, the list of one-off villains featured in He-Man and the Masters of the Universe is quite extensive. Besides those listed, some of the others include Darkdream, the Enchantress, the Game Master, General Tartaran, Jarvan, Negator, Nepthu, Monteeg, Lord Masque, Morgoth, Azrog, Spydra and monsters such as the dragon Shadowing, Bakull, the Creeping Horak, Yog and Sh'Gora.)

Many of He-Man's recurring allies would be featured as well, such as Zodac, Man-E-Faces, Delora, Lizard-Man, the Trollans Dree-Elle and Uncle Montork, Squinch and the Widgets, Melaktha, and the wise and ancient dragon Granamyr. (Note: Some of these pre-existing characters would have slightly altered backstories for Filmation: Zodac (voiced by Lou Scheimer) was a leading member of a group of Cosmic Enforcers; Man-E-Faces (also voiced by Scheimer), was presented as a villain tormenting the Widgets, before reforming and becoming Eternia's greatest actor; and Delora, of the Bird-People of Avion, is presented as Stratos' sister, rather than his wife as in the earlier comics (Delora is sometimes interchanged in MOTU lore with another female Avonian, Hawke). Others such as Lizard-Man, the Royal Archaeologist Melaktha, the Trollans and the Widgets were Filmation creations and did not receive vintage action figures. Writer Larry DiTillio originally created Granamyr for a 'Tunnels & Trolls' role playing game module entitled "The Isle of Darksmoke", bringing and adapting the character into MOTU.) Season two would see more of Mattel's action figures making their animated debuts on the side of He-Man, such as Buzz-Off, Roboto, Fisto, Mekaneck, Moss Man, and Sy-Klone. (Note: Many of these characters would receive little character development in Filmation, but information was provided for some: Buzz-off was the leader of the Bee-People of the Mystic Mountains (voiced by Allen Oppenheimer), Roboto is uniquely presented as a robotic alien explorer marooned on Eternia (also voiced by Alan Oppenheimer), Fisto was originally a powerful loner and adversary of He-Man before joining forces (voiced by Lou Scheimer, but like most of Scheimer's voice work, is credited as Erik Gunden) and Meckaneck is shown as a loyal warrior with a bionic neck, in search of his lost son (also by Lou Scheimer). Voiced by Scheimer as well are Moss Man (a transforming plant being and spy) and the spinning tornado warrior, Sy-Klone, who appears in two episodes with little to no backstory.) Throughout the series a multitude of minor characters, beasts and magical items would also appear, often only for a single episode. (Note: Many Filmation created allies would make only one or two appearances throughout the two seasons, such as Kol Darr, Chad and his pet Buzbee, Kittrina of the Cat-Folk, Garth of the insect people, Moak the mole-creature, Zilora of the Snake Clan, the singer Celice, Randor's father King Miro and many others.) Several prominent locations around Eternia like the Mystic Mountains and the Sands of Time would appear frequently, as would vehicles such as the Wind Raider, Sky Sled, Attak-Trak and Skeletor's Collector. (Note: Apart from the usual settings in Eternos City, Castle Grayskull and Snake Mountain, other Eternian locations like the Temple of the Sun, the Kingdom of Avion, the Vine Jungle, the Evergreen Forest, the Ice Mountains, and the Crystal Sea were also featured. Some of the other vehicles appearing in the series were the Mattel created Battle-Ram, Talon Fighter, Roton, Stridor, Land-Shark, Dragon-Walker, Road-Ripper, and the Filmation exclusive Basher, Doom-Buster and War-Sled.) The Attak-Trak vehicle in particular was portrayed as a sentient, talking robotic vehicle (voiced by Lou Scheimer) and had a van-like appearance, differing from its' Mattel toy line counterpart.

With the FCC's loosening of regulations in 1981, the Filmation series pushed the boundaries for the narrative scope of children's TV programming in the time period. Groups like Action for Children's Television lobbied against cartoons featuring muscular superheroes who engaged in on-screen combat. Though in most instances with He-Man, simply outwitting one's opponent, or wrestling-style moves and throws were utilized instead of direct violence. There was also longstanding criticism of He-Man and the Masters of the Universe and similar cartoons advertising and directly marketing a line of toys to children. In opposition to the negative controversy, Filmation executives made sure that a "life lesson" or "moral of the story" was played at the end of each episode, which was tied to the central theme of the story in question. (Note: Donald F. Roberts was hired as an educational consultant to help bring this morality to the series. In the United Kingdom, however, the closing "morals" were often edited out of the original broadcasts.) Tasked by Lou Scheimer with making the series much more than just advertising for the toy line, prominent writers on the show included Robby London, Larry DiTillio, David Wise, Michael Reaves, Robert Lamb, Douglas Booth, Rowby Goren, Janis Diamond, J. Brynne Stephens, Mark Scott Zicree, Mel Gilden, and many others; including an episode by D.C. Fontana, and early script work from J. Michael Straczynski and Paul Dini. (Note: Episode direction was provided by Gwen Wetzler, Marsh Lamore, Lou Kachivas, Steve Clark, Ernie Schmidt, Ed Friedman, and others.) Unlike many studios at the time, Filmation did not outsource its' animation department, hiring local artists for the duration of the series. (Note: Tom Sito served as one of the main storyboard artists, along with artists and designers Tom Tataranowicz, Warren Greenwood, Don Manuel, Bob Arkwright, Herb Hazelton, Rich Arons, Victoria Jensen and Gerald Forton, as well as many other contributors.) The theme song and the musical score was composed by Shuki Levy and Haim Saban; while only four voices actors would portray the vast array of characters throughout the series: John Erwin, Alan Oppenheimer, Linda Gary and executive producer Lou Scheimer (credited as Erik Gunden). (Note: Lou Scheimer's daughter Erika, and his wife Jay would also provide occasional voice acting on the show, as would an uncredited George DiCenzo, prior to taking the role of Hordak in the She-Ra spin-off series.)

He-Man and the Masters of the Universe, though still very popular, would air the series' final episode, "The Cold Zone", on December 8, 1984, and was not renewed for a third season in 1985. Instead Filmation's focus was placed on the spinoff series She-Ra: Princess of Power, which was set in the same universe and followed the same continuity. She-Ra began with the animated movie He-Man and She-Ra: The Secret of the Sword, released theatrically in the spring of 1985 and featuring many of the main characters from both Filmation series. Multiple He-Man and the Masters of the Universe characters continued to appear in guest roles throughout the She-Ra: Princess of Power series, as well as the He-Man & She-Ra Christmas Special. The very last appearance of Filmation's He-Man and Skeletor is in one of the final She-Ra episodes, titled "Assault on the Hive", airing December 13, 1986. With no true conclusion to the Filmation He-Man series produced, the 110th episode "The Problem With Power", though it aired a month prior to the final episode in 1984, is often cited as the best episode of series and a more fitting finale, with He-Man carrying Teela off into the sunset.

==== Filmation-era MOTU action figures and mini comics (1984–1985) ====
Sales of the toy line continued to increase with the exposure of the animated series, and new waves of figures and vehicles, as seen in the Filmation cartoon, were produced during this peak of Masters of the Universe's popularity. The third wave of the original Masters of the Universe toy line in 1984 would introduce the first new versions of the two main characters, as "Battle Armor" He-Man and "Battle Armor" Skeletor, who could be "damaged" when the mechanism on the figure's chest was tapped. (Note: These new renditions of He-Man and Skeletor did not appear in the animated series or the mini comics, only appearing in promotional artwork and various children's books released at the time. Several new characters in the Filmation series, however, did find releases in these third and fourth waves of action figures.)

Making their toy-line debuts in 1984 were He-Man's allies the "heroic spy in the sky" Buzz-Off, a bee-like insectoid warrior with wings, the "heroic hand-to-hand fighter" Fisto, with an oversized spring-loaded fist, and the "heroic human periscope" Mekaneck, with an extendable bionic neck. (Note: Mekaneck was actually released at the tail end of 1983, but is still considered a 3rd wave figure.) The first action figures for the "heroic secret identity of He-Man" Prince Adam, and the "heroic court magician" Orko (utilizing a pull-cord feature that would make the figure spin around), were also produced in this third wave.

Skeletor's evil warriors received new recruits as well in 1984, in the crab-like form of Clawful, the "warrior with the grip of evil" with his oversized pincer for a hand, the "evil master of martial arts" Jitsu, with a gold chopping hand action feature, the "evil master of snakes" Kobra Khan, who could be filled with water to spray "poison" mist on his enemies, the "evil master of escape" Webstor, with a working grappling hook and pulley system, and lastly, the "evil tail-thrashing warrior" Whiplash, a reptilian with a rubber tail. (Note: Additional three packs of both Heroic and Evil Warriors continued to be released with updated figures in both 1984 and 1985, as were various two-packs of figures sold by JCPenney in plain cardboard boxes, with uncoloured artwork.)

Vehicles produced in the third wave include the Dragon Walker, Road Ripper, Roton and the hybrid vehicle/creature Stridor. (Note: The Dragon Walker is a motorized "sidewinding beast/vehicle" with unique sideways locomotion. The Road Ripper "warrior carrier" could zip across the floor with a fast-action pull cord. Skeletor's "evil assault vehicle" Roton, had a round rotating outer disc. Stridor, the "heroic armored war horse" had no articulation, other than its' movable guns and tail. Stridor was often paired in promotional images with Fisto, and the two were also released together in a two-pack. Other multi-packs included "Battle Damage" He-man with either Battle Cat or the Road Ripper, "Battle Damage" Skeletor with either Panthor or Screeech, and a rare "Battle for Eternia" set featuring Man-E-Faces, "Battle Damage" Skeletor and Panthor. Box art for this wave was primarily done by William George and William Garland.) A "Weapons Pak" was also released, containing extra "arms & armor" in alternate colour schemes, as were two collectors cases to store and carry the action figures. (Note: The "Weapons Pak" included blue coloured versions of He-Man's Power Sword and axe, yellow-coloured Beast Man armour with an extra whip, black Zodac armour and gun, an extra weapon for Man-E-Faces and darker-grey versions of some of the weapons included with Castle Grayskull. The Collectors Cases were large vinyl cases featuring artwork of the characters in battle, and containing plastic trays to hold the action figures, coming in both regular and jumbo sizes.) The major playset for 1984 was Skeletor's evil stronghold, Snake Mountain (looking quite unlike the Filmation version, with a giant ghoulish face molded into the plastic and a voice-distorting wolf-headed microphone).

During this Filmation-era, the characters in series three of Mattel's MOTU mini-comics would begin to resemble their cartoon counterparts more closely (like the Sorceress in her falcon-attire), and contained many stories loosely adapted from episodes of the animated series' first-season such as "The Dragon's Gift", "Masks of Power" and others. (Note: The "Dragon's Gift" mini-comic (featuring the dragon Granamyr with a green-ish hue, instead of red), would more closely resemble its' related Filmation episode than the other comics. Though the "Masks of Power" comic had the exact same title as the episode, the story was heavily modified, with many of the other adapted stories featuring entirely different titles and characters.) The mini-comics were mostly written by series bible author Michael Halperin and edited under the supervision of Lee Nordling. Alfred Alcala would return to provide art for several of the comics, and artist Larry Houston would also begin his run on the series. While most of the new figures from the toy line would appear in the 1984 mini-comics, they were not given introductions or as much focus as in the previous wave. Original mini-comic characters (without action figures) were often featured instead, such as Prince Dakon and the evil Geldor in "The Secret Liquid of Life", as well as Princess Rana and the Kobold-master Lodar in "Slave City". (Note: Other 1984 mini-comics included "Siege of Avion", "He-Man and the Insect People", "The Clash of Arms", "Double Edged Sword", "The Temple of Darkness", and "The Obelisk"; with Prince Adam, Cringer, Buzz-Off, Mekaneck, Fisto, Stridor, Kobra-Khan, Jitsu, Webstor, Clawful, and Whiplash all making their mini-comic debuts. Orko, although part of this wave, would not appear in any of the 1984 mini-comics.)

By the end of 1984 Masters of the Universe was said to have conquered the toy market, and 1985 would prove to be one of the peak years of the franchise, with the toy line bringing in hundreds million dollars worldwide. The fourth wave would debut 13 new action figures, and again include new versions of He-Man and Skeletor with deluxe action features: "Thunder Punch" He-Man (whose backpack could be loaded with plastic cap discs to create a loud "bang" when turning He-Man's waist) and "Dragon Blaster" Skeletor (which included a "dreadful" water-squirting dragon chained to the armor of the "evil leader"). (Note: Though never seen in the Filmation series, "Thunder Punch" He-Man and "Dragon Blaster" Skeletor would make respective appearances in the mini-comics The Treachery of Modulok" and "Skeletor's Dragon". These versions of Skeletor and He-Man were the first figures to be packaged on larger-sized deluxe blister cards, showcasing character artwork on the front of the card by William George (with the back of the cards continuing to feature artwork by Errol McCarthy). In addition, special "Thunder Punch Ammo" packs (with 27 cap rings) were also sold separately to replenish the "heroic leader" He-Man's "loud power punch".)

Heroic warriors included in this wave were the "heroic spy and master of camouflage", Moss Man, a green-flocked and pine-scented reuse of the Beast Man mold, Roboto, the "heroic mechanical warrior", with visible moving gears and multiple weapons that could be inserted into his arm socket, and Sy-Klone, the "heroic fist-flinging tornado", whose torso would spin around 360 degrees when turning the dial on his waist. Evil warriors in 1985 consisted of Spikor, the "untouchable master of evil combat", who was covered in purple rubber spikes with a trident for an arm, the "double-headed evil strategist" Two-Bad, whose spring-action arms allowed the figure to punch himself in either of his two heads, and Stinkor, the "evil master of odors"; a foul-smelling redeco of the Mer-Man mold. (Note: The Stinkor figure was produced with a distinctive and unpleasant smell, said to have been created by mixing patchouli oil into the plastic (with some vintage figures still retaining their scents for decades). Stinkor was the only new character from the 1985 line that would not make an appearance in any Filmation cartoon.)

Vehicles and creatures produced in this fourth wave were the "heroic combat vehicle" Bashasaurus, with a large club-like battering arm, Land Shark, an "evil monster/vehicle" with a chomping shark mouth, Night Stalker the "evil armored battle steed", Skeletor's giant mechanical spider, the "evil stalker" Spydor, and Battle Bones, a "collector's carry case" and dinosaur skeleton-creature hybrid. (Note: Not appearing in the mini-comics or Filmation, Night Stalker, was a recolour of the previous year's Stridor, and was also offered in a two-pack set with Jitsu. The other two-pack out of this group was Land Shark packaged with "Battle Armor" Skeletor. William George was the artist for most of 1985's packaging artwork for the boxed releases.)

The largest addition to the 1985 Masters of the Universe toy line came in the form of the Evil Horde, a new faction in opposition to both He-Man and Skeletor, who were set to debut in the animated He-Man and She-Ra: The Secret of the Sword motion picture. Though they would be positioned as the primary adversaries of She-Ra, all but one of initial Evil Horde figures were produced for the Masters of Universe line, instead of the new Princess of Power toy line. (Note: The Horde villainess Catra was the only original Evil Horde member produced for the Princess of Power toy line in its' 1985 debut. All other Masters of the Universe Horde figures would have a 'The Evil Horde' batwing logo present above the character's name and tagline on their blister cards.) The new major villain and "ruthless leader of the Evil Horde" Hordak would make his action figure debut in this wave, followed by his underlings, Mantenna the "evil spy with the pop-out eyes", the "evil master of power suction" Leech, with suction-cup hands and mouth, and Grizzlor, the "hairy henchman of the Evil Horde", with actual faux fur. Also released as part of the Evil Horde was Modulok, the "evil beast with a thousand bodies", a unique two-headed figure with 22 segmented body parts that could be taken apart and reassembled into more than 1,000 different combinations. (Note: Modulok had already appeared in the He-Man and the Masters of the Universe Filmation cartoon on the side of Skeletor, but was shown in his accompanying mini-comic "The Treachery of Modulok", leaving Skeletor and joining the Horde (as would also be seen in the upcoming She-Ra: Princess of Power animated series). The figure would be sold in its' own unique box, rather than the usual blister card.) Hordak's lair, the Fright Zone, was released as a playset as part of this wave in 1985, though this "trap-filled stronghold of terror" would bare no resemblance to the mechanical/industrial-looking Fright Zone as seen in the animated She-Ra series. (Note: A unique "Hordak / Grizzlor" action adventure set two-pack was also produced in 1985 in low numbers, with the two action figures accompanied by an audio cassette and premium-style comic booklet entitled "The Power of the Evil Horde!". The audio featured the music and voice actors from Filmation, and provided an alternate introduction to the Horde, as opposed to the one depicted in the The Secret of the Sword animated movie.)

Series four of the mini-comics in 1985 were no longer based on the animated episodes and began to depart from some aspects of Filmation's continuity. (Note: The mini-comic "The Battle of Roboto", would give an entirely different origin of Roboto from what was depicted in Filmation. Some characters and vehicles debuting in these mini-comics would not appear in Filmation at all, such as Stinkor from "The Stench of Evil", Battle Bones from "Skeletor's Dragon" and Spydor from "Spikor Strikes"; although the Filmation created character of Orko would finally make his first mini-comic appearance in "Hordak - The Ruthless Leader's Revenge!".) Unlike the previous wave, many new figures and vehicles would prominently feature in their accompanying mini-comics, with each member of the Evil Horde appearing in their own titular comic. (Note: The Horde members were introduced in the mini-comics: "Hordak - The Ruthless Leader's Revenge!", "Mantenna and the Menace of the Evil Horde", "Leech - The Master of Power Suction Unleashed!", "Grizzlor - The Legend Comes Alive!" and "The Treachery of Modulok!". These comics would contrast some of the continuity and timeline soon to be presented in the She-Ra: Princess of Power animated series and The Secret of the Sword animated movie.) These stories would shift focus to the Horde's attempts to attack He-Man and invade Eternia, rather than anything related to the soon to debut She-Ra: Princess of Power animated series. (Note: Christy Marx wrote several of the 1985 mini-comics, while Lee Nordling remained as editor. Larry Houston continued to provide artwork on some of these issues, while other contributors included Bruce Timm, Peter Ledger, Mike Sekowsky, Michael Lee, Charles Simpson, Stan Sakai and others.)

=== She-Ra – Animated movie, Filmation series and toy line ===
==== The introduction of She-Ra and The Secret of the Sword animated feature (1985) ====
In 1984, working in tandem, Mattel and Filmation decided to diversify the Masters of the Universe line beyond its traditional realm of "male action figures", in the hopes of bringing in a young female audience as well. Thus, a spin-off animated series and all new line of dolls/action figures for girls was put forth into development. A warrior-woman heroine in the same vein as He-Man was first conceptualized by producer Lou Scheimer, and sketched-out visually by Mattel designers Justine Dantzer and Noreen Porter, as well as Filmation's Diane Keener. After a few earlier iterations, writer Larry DiTillio would name the character She-Ra and create much of her backstory; with elements that were similar to He-Man, yet unique in her own right and with respect to her femininity. (Note: The concept of She-Ra, was first proposed as "Leela", the twin sister of Teela (instead of Adam/He-Man), riding on a silver-winged reindeer. When changed from Teela's sister to He-Man's sister, and rejecting the name "She-Ro" (based on "He-Ro"); writer Larry DiTillio suggested the name "He-Ra" (derived from the Greek goddess Hera, as a combination of the 'He' from He-Man with 'Ra', the Ancient Egyptian Sun God), before settling on She-Ra with Mattel and Filmation.) In conjunction with Mattel's new 'Princess of Power' toy line, Filmation's new animated series titled She-Ra: Princess of Power would begin to take shape, attempting to showcase characters that would appeal to young girls as role models, without losing the interest of boys; providing something for everyone.

In the series bible (developed by Larry DiTillo, along with J. Michael Straczynski), She-Ra would be revealed as Princess Adora, the long-lost twin sister of Prince Adam/He-Man, living on Eternia's sister planet of Etheria. Etheria had been subjugated by the Evil Horde, under the leadership of Hordak, the main antagonist of the new series, whose frightening demonic/vampiric visage was wreathed with a cowl of bones. (Note: The concept of Hordak went through many iterations that saw contributions from Ted Mayer, Dave Capper, Curtis Cim, Charles Zembillas, Gerald Forton and Herb Hazelton; with Roger Sweet stating that Hordak’s face was based on a witch doctor’s mask.) In joining the rebellion against the evil ruling Horde Empire, the premise of She-Ra's conflict on Etheria is the inverse to that of He-Man on Eternia; in which He-Man and his allies were part of the ruling class, defending against Skeletor's attempts to conquer Eternia.

She-Ra and the world of Etheria would be introduced in the animated feature He-Man and She-Ra: The Secret of the Sword, which was released in theaters on March 22, 1985. (Note: The Secret of the Sword movie was actually created by trimming, combining and enhancing the first five episodes of the upcoming She-Ra: Princess of Power animated series, that had already been produced, but would not air until September later that year.) Though not rating high with critics, the film was a box-office success, grossing three times its budget, making over $7.5 million in its' theatrical run. The Secret of the Sword would feature most major characters from He-Man and the Masters of the Universe and introduce many of the new characters and concepts behind the forthcoming animated series.

A He-Man and She-Ra: The Secret of the Sword promotional comic book was distributed to theatres across North America, and a soundtrack featuring the single "I Have The Power" by Erika Scheimer, Haim Saban and Shuki Levy (with additional vocals by Noam Kaniel), was also released in conjunction with the film.

==== She-Ra: Princess of Power – Filmation animated series (1985–1987) ====
She-Ra- Princess of Power (1985 Filmation animated series) logo

Filmation's She-Ra: Princess of Power first aired "The Sword of She-Ra Part 1: Into Etheria" on September 9, 1985. This, along with the following four episodes had previously been cut and compiled to form The Secret of the Sword animated movie from earlier that spring. She-Ra: Princess of Power was produced by Filmation in lieu of continuing He-Man and the Masters of the Universe for a third year; however, He-Man, Skeletor, and other characters from the prior series would often appear throughout the She-Ra animated series. She-Ra: Princess of Power would run for two seasons, with 93 episodes and a Christmas Special, from September, 1985 to December, 1987.

She-Ra was born as Princess Adora on Eternia, Prince Adam/He-Man's twin sister and daughter of King Randor and Queen Marlena. As an infant, Adora is kidnapped by Hordak (the primary villain of the series), who was leading an attack on Eternia alongside Skeletor, then serving as Hordak's apprentice. She is taken to the world of Etheria, a planet ruled by The Horde, and the main setting of the She-Ra series. Adora is raised within the Fright Zone (the Horde's techno-industrial base of operations on Etheria) and brainwashed into being the Horde's Force Captain by Hordak and his dark-magic wielding confidant Shadow Weaver. After encountering her brother He-Man, who was sent on a mission by the Sorceress to find his long-lost sister on Etheria, Adora acquires the Sword of Protection and seeks to learn the true evil nature of the Horde. Transforming into She-Ra for this first time and seeing the error of her ways, she becomes a member of the Great Rebellion; a small band of rebels living in the Whispering Woods (representing magic and the natural world), fighting to free Etheria from the tyrannical rule of Hordak and his Evil Horde (representing technology and the destruction of nature).

Like Prince Adam's transformation into He-Man, Princess Adora transforms into She-Ra via her Sword of Protection, which is nearly identical to He-Man's Sword of Power, but with a jewel embedded in its hilt. (Note: The Sword of Protection would first appear in the season two He-Man and the Masters of the Universe episode "Origin of the Sorceress", as presented by Kuduk Ungol to Teela-Na upon her ascension to Sorceress of Castle Grayskull.) Adora's transformation is similarly triggered by holding her sword over her head, but with her own unique invocation: "For the honor of Grayskull... I am She-Ra!". She-Ra then transforms her horse Spirit into the flying unicorn Swift Wind (akin to Cringer/Battle Cat). Though possessing great strength similar to He-Man, She-Ra is shown to have additional powers, such as the ability to heal with her touch, communicate with animals via telepathy, and transform her sword into different items (such as a lasso, shield, or flaming blade).

Portrayed by voice actor Melendy Britt, Adora keeps her identity as She-Ra a secret from even her primary allies in the Great Rebellion: Glimmer (voiced by Linda Gary), a spirited magic user with the ability to manipulate light and invisibility, and the skilled archer Bow (voiced by George DiCenzo), the main male heroic character of the series. The few that are aware of She-Ra's true identity include her brother He-Man, her steed Spirit/Swift Wind, Bow's timid companion Kowl (an owl/koala-like creature with large rainbow-colored ears for wings), the absent-minded magician Madame Razz and her wise-cracking sidekick, Broom. (Note: He-Man was again portrayed by John Erwin during his appearances in the She-Ra series; while Madame Razz was voiced by Erwin's fellow He-Man and the Masters of the Universe alumni, Linda Gary (Alan Oppenheimer would also return for the appearances of Skeletor, Cringer/Battle Cat and Man-At-Arms). Erik Gunden (a pseudonym of Filmation's executive producer Lou Scheimer) voiced Kowl, Broom and Spirit/Swift Wind; with Scheimer often altering the pitch of his voice using a harmonizer during recordings.) Also aware of the secret is the mystical Light Hope (voiced by Lou Scheimer), who resides high atop Mount Skydancer in the Crystal Castle, and serves as a "Sorceress of Grayskull–type" guide to She-Ra.

Other frequently appearing allies of She-Ra are Glimmer's mother—the winged Queen of Bright Moon, Angella, the powerful sorcerer queen of Mystacor, Castaspella, the ruler of the Kingdom of Snows, Frosta (with the ability to control ice and snow), and the small munchkin-like forest-dwelling Twiggits (mainly consisting of Sprocker, Spritina, and Sprag). (Note: Queen Angella, Frosta and Spritina the Twiggit are all portrayed by Erika Scheimer; while Lou Scheimer, under the pseudonym Erik Gunden, voices the other two main Twiggit characters Sprag and Sprocker. The voice of She-Ra, Melendy Britt, also provides the voice of Castaspella in the She-Ra: Princess of Power series.) A special hidden character, Loo-Kee (voiced by Erika Scheimer), was also a regular feature of the cartoon series, and can be found camouflaged somewhere in the background of nearly every episode; emerging at the end of the episode, revealing to viewers where he had been hiding and relaying the moral of the story.

The primary villainous faction of the series, the Evil Horde is led by Hordak (voiced by George DiCenzo, portrayed with a snorting laugh and temperament slightly more fearsome than that of Skeletor), an adept sorcerer who often choses technology over magic, transforming his body parts into mechanized weapons and objects such as cannons and rockets. Hordak rules over Etheria from within the industrial monstrosity known as the Fright Zone, high up on his throne in the Doom Tower, issuing commands to his underlings in the Horde (whose members are often depicted wearing a bat-like insignia). Frequently at Hordak's side are his powerful magic-using second-in-command, Shadow Weaver (a floating red-robed witch with a hidden face), and his bat-like spy, Imp, a diminutive shape-shifter, who enjoys snitching on fellow Horde members. (Note: Shadow Weaver's voice was portrayed by Linda Gary, and Imp was portrayed by Erika Scheimer. Neither character would receive an action figure in either the Masters of the Universe or Princess of Power toy lines. It would take until the Masters of the Universe Classics line in 2012 and 2014, respectively, that the first figures of these prominent characters would be released.)

The Horde on Etheria is revealed to be part of a larger interstellar Horde Empire that continues expand its' grip, enslaving the people of Etheria through Hordak's legions of armored robot-like Horde Troopers, mechanized vehicles, and his special task force of henchman known as the Force Squad. The Force Squad, is headed by a 'Force Captain', a position originally held by Adora, and now taken up by Catra (voiced by Melendy Britt), a raven-haired villainess with a special mask that gives her the ability to turn into a panther. Catra's Force Squad roster consists of the bug-eyed Mantenna (whom Hordak loves to torment and drop through a trap-door), Grizzlor (the prison operator on Beast Island), the amphibian-like Leech (with the ability to drain his opponent's life-force), and the pincer-clawed scorpion-woman, Scorpia. (Note: Linda Gary was the voice of Scorpia, while the other three Force Squad minions: Mantenna, Leech and Grizzlor were all portrayed by Erik Gunden (aka Lou Scheimer) using various voice modulating effects.)

As the series progressed, the Horde would feature additional members, including Skeletor's former scientist henchman Modulok, his robotic creation Multi-Bot, the Horde technician Entrapta (an evil inventor with deadly braided hair), the octopus-woman Octavia, the Horde zookeeper Vultak, the robotic Horde Trooper commander Dylamug, as well as the future Snake Men, Rattlor and Tung-Lashor. (Note: Melendy Britt voiced Octavia; Linda Gary voiced Entrapta; George DiCenzo was the voice of Tung-Lashor and Vultak; while the others (Rattlor, Dyalmug, Multi-Bot and Modulok) were all portrayed by Erik Gunden (Lou Scheimer). Entrapta would be the 2nd Horde Villain released in the Princess of Power toy line (after Catra), however, Octavia, Dylamug and Vultak did not receive actions figures until Masters of the Universe Classics over 25 years later.) The overarching interplanetary supreme leader of the Horde Empire, Horde Prime, who held leadership over both Hordak and Skeletor, was also introduced during the She-Ra Filmation series. (Note: Making several appearances in the She-Ra: Princess of Power series, Horde Prime was depicted as a gigantic figure shrouded in mist, only revealing his massive metallic arm and glowing red eyes. The character was first mentioned by his son, Prince Zed, in the season one episode "The Peril of Whispering Woods", and would debut a few episodes later aboard his flagship the 'Velvet Glove', in "Horde Prime Takes a Holiday" (as portrayed by Erik Gunden/Lou Scheimer). With Prince Zed referring to Hordak as 'uncle', it was speculated that Hordak was the brother of Horde Prime, but never confirmed. An alternate version of the character's full appearance would be revealed in a Masters of the Universe / Princess of Power "Twins of Power" one-shot comic book released by London Editions Magazines in the UK in 1986.)

The Great Rebellion would also gain additional members and allies, such as the swashbuckling pirate Sea-Hawk (Adora's love-interest in the series), the mermaid princess of the underwater kingdom of Salineas, Mermista, the carefree flower-loving Perfuma, net-tossing trapper Netossa, the peacock-feathered far-seeing Peekablue, butterfly-like Flutterina, and the space-faring scout Sweet Bee. (Note: George DiCenzo was the voice of Sea-Hawk; Linda Gary voiced Sweet Bee; Melendy Britt was Mermista; Erika Scheimer performed the voices for Peekablue, Perfuma, Flutterina and Huntara; while a second season addition to the voice cast, Diane Pershing, provided the voice for Netossa and Spinnerella.) A few animals and creatures would appear in the series on the side of the Rebellion as well, such as Bow's horse Arrow, the giant swan Enchanta, Crystal Sun Dancer and Sorrowful the Dragon. As the He-Man and the Masters of the Universe cartoon was no longer in production, a few MOTU toy line characters would appear in the She-Ra series instead; such as the water spraying elephant-man Snout Spout (referred to as "Hose Nose" in his debut appearance), the Meteorbs Comet Cat and Dinosorb, Hordak's Mantisaur, and the Rock People Rokkon and Stonedar. (Note: A third Rock Warrior, a female known as Granita, appeared along with Rokkon and Stonedar in the series, but would not receive an action figure until 2018 in Super7's Masters of the Universe Classics Collector's Choice line.) Some of the other notable one-off heroes and villains include Spinnerella, Huntara, General Sunder, False-Face, the Red Knight, Glimmer's father King Micah, Catra's pet Clawdeen, Kowl's cousin Red-Eye, the Star Sisters and Colonel Blast (based on an early concept version of the character Rio Blast).

A dual-branded television special, "He-Man & She-Ra: A Christmas Special", would air in December of 1985 and feature numerous characters from both Filmation series. The special would feature Orko and Skeletor visiting Earth, with Skeletor learning of the concept of Christmas and saving two Earth children from the Horde in a rare change of character. (Note: He-Man & She-Ra: A Christmas Special would also debut two groups of transforming robotic characters known as the Manchines and the Monstroids; though the Monstroids would bear no resemblance to the Masters of the Universe toy line's Horde 'Monstroid' creature.)

Though successful, She-Ra: Princess of Power struggled to achieve the same ratings as its' predecessor, yet retained much of the same production team at Filmation. Prominent writers on the animated series included Larry DiTillio, J. Michael Straczynski, Francis Moss, Robert Lamb, Don Heckman, and Bob Forward. (Note: Some of the other writers on She-Ra: Princess of Power include Mike Chain, Carol Baxter, Brooks Watchel, J. Larry Carroll, Steven J. Fisher, Philip Kassel, Michael Utvich, Michael Chase Walker, Leslie Wilson and Chris Weber.) Storyboard artists Tom Sito and Tom Tataranowicz would also direct several episodes of the series, amongst many other directors and artistic contributors. (Note: Episode direction was also provided by Gwen Wetzler, Richard Trueblood, Mark Glamack, Marsh Lamore, Bill Nunes, Lou Kachivas, Steve Clark, Bill Reed, Ernie Schmidt, Bob Arkwright and Ed Friedman; as produced by Arthur Nadel. Additional artistic contributions were made by Keith Tucker, Jim Shull, Herb Hazelton, Alice Hamm, Rick Quiroz, Diane Keener, Michael Swanigan, Don Manuel, Gerald Forton, William Barry, Fred Carillo, Pat Wong, Larry Eikelberry, Ed Haney, Lew Ott, Charles Zembillas, Bruce Timm, Dale Hendrickson and many others.) The musical score was again composed by Shuki Levy and Haim Saban, with Erika Lane (another Lou Scheimer pseudonym) assisting with She-Ra's theme. Both primary She-Ra writer/creators Larry DiTillio and J. Michael Straczynski would not be a part of She-Ra's second season in 1986, which would consist of additional 28 episodes (as opposed to the 65 of the first season). Season two of She-Ra: Princess of Power premiered on September 13, 1986, shifting from daily syndication to a Saturday morning format, airing through late 1986 and 1987. With a decline in the series popularity She-Ra: Princess of Power would air its final episode, "Swifty's Baby", on December 12, 1987, with no real finale for either the She-Ra or He-Man Filmation series.

==== Princess of Power toy line (1985–1987) ====
Released in 1985, Mattel's toy line Princess of Power (sometimes abbreviated as POP) featured almost exclusively female characters, with an emphasis on doll-like comb-able hair and partial soft-goods outfits. Described as "fashion action dolls", Mattel attempted to fuse the appeal of Masters of the Universe with their successful Barbie line, adding many "Fantastic Fashions" clothing and accessory packs to complement the figures. The Princess of Power toy line ran from 1985 to 1987, for which Mattel would release a total of 22 action figure/dolls (with 12 creatures/vehicles, 2 playsets, and 16 clothing accessories).

The 1985 Princess of Power figures included "the most powerful woman in the universe" She-Ra, her "special friend" Bow (the only male figure in the POP line), the "guide who lights the way" Glimmer, "the know-it owl" Kowl, Angella the "angelic winged guide", Frosta the "ice empress of Etheria", Castaspella the "enchantress who hypnotizes", the "glamorous double agent" Double Trouble, and the "jealous beauty" Catra, the main female antagonist of the toy line. (Note: Double Trouble does not appear in the Filmation cartoon series, appearing only in the mini-comics and a few children's books in the 1980s. The character would be reimagined and gain a more prominent role in the She-Ra and the Princesses of Power series in 2019.) The other preeminent villains of the She-Ra series, Hordak and the Evil Horde were released by Mattel under the Masters of the Universe branding instead. She-Ra's main play-set for 1985 was Crystal Castle, a "shimmering castle of fantasy and fun for She-Ra and her friends!". Enchanta, a large swan creature/vehicle, was also produced in the first wave of toys, as were several winged-horses to accompany the figures: Swift Wind for She-Ra, Arrow for Bow, and Storm for Catra.

In 1986, a new "Starburst" version of She-Ra was accompanied in the second wave by her allies the "beautiful flying lookout" Flutterina (with fluttering butterfly-like wings), Mermista the "Mist-i-fying mermaid", the "watchful feathered friend" Peekablue (with fanning peacock-like "feathers"), Perfuma the "scent-sational flower maiden", and the "honey of a guide" Sweet Bee (with glow-in-the-dark antennae and wings). Opposing them was a new "Scratchin' Sound" version of Catra, who was joined by her "glamorous" feline pet Clawdeen, and the fellow Horde-villainess Entrapta, "the tricky golden beauty" (with long-braided hair to trap her rivals). "Crystal" translucent plastic versions of Swift Wind and the flying horses Sun Dancer and Moonbeam were released in wave two, along with the Butterflyer and Sea Harp vehicles, and the Crystal Falls play-set.

Never reaching the heights achieved by the Masters of the Universe toy line in the mid-1980s, the third and final wave of Princess of Power in 1987 saw diminished sales and production with the releases of "Bubble Power" She-Ra, and a "Royal" version of her steed Swift Wind; along with "Shower Power" Catra, and a "Silver" version of her horse Storm. Also in this final wave were She-Ra's friends: the "captivating beauty" Netossa (whose cape becomes a capturing net), the "dizzying defender" Spinnerella (with swirling scooter), and the petite raccoon-like Filmation character Loo-Kee, who "hides & sees all in Etheria". (Note: Several prominent and recurring characters from the She-Ra cartoon did not receive action figures in either the original POP or MOTU toy lines, such as She-Ra's alter-ego Princess Adora, Madame Razz, Broom, Light Hope, the Twiggits and Sea-Hawk; as well as the Horde villains Shadow Weaver, Scorpia, Imp, Octavia, and Vultak.)

Similar to the Masters of the Universe toy line, the Princess of Power line featured 12 mini-comics, which were packaged with the figures. (Note: Nearly all of the She-Ra mini-comics were pencilled by artist Jim Mitchell, with a few written by Tina Harris. Other contributors include Stan Sakai, Charles Simpson, Eric Frydler and Todd Kurosawa.) The first mini-comic, entitled "The Story of She-Ra", briefly mentions She-Ra's origin and kidnapping by Hordak on Eternia; however the rest of the comics primarily focus on Catra as the villain and downplay her connection to the Evil Horde. Several children's books, comics, magazines, and read-along record/cassette-tape books were also released worldwide in conjunction with the Princess of Power toy line from 1985 to 1988.

=== Live-action movie and the final years of the original toyline ===
==== Later years of the original Masters of the Universe toy line (1986–1987) ====
In 1986, the action figures released for Mattel's fifth wave of Masters of the Universe no longer had the promotional juggernaut that was the He-Man and the Masters of the Universe animated series behind them; yet sales in 1986 would reach a franchise high of 400 million dollars, and more items would be released than any year prior.

Though the franchise was beginning to move past the original animated series, promotion for Masters of the Universe was still present in Filmation's spin-off series She-Ra: Princess of Power, which continued airing new episodes in 1986 featuring several new characters from the MOTU toy line. Appearing in the episode "The Rock People", some of the first figures released that year were the comet warriors: the "young heroic battling boulder" Rokkon, and Stonedar, the "heroic rock people leader"; both with the ability to transform into meteor/boulder-like forms. (Note: Several origin stories were presented for Rokkon and Stonedar in the accompanying mini-comic "Rock People to the Rescue", with alternate origins appearing in the She-Ra Filmation series, UK comics, German audio cassettes and Ehapa comics. The creation of the transforming Rokkon and Stonedar figures is credited to both Ted Mayer and Roger Sweet.) They were followed by the elephant-headed Snout Spout, the "heroic water-blasting firefighter", as well as the "heroic transforming gunslinger" Rio Blast, and Extendar, the "heroic master of extension", whose head, arms, torso and legs were all extendable. (Note: Featured in the mini-comic "Eye of the Storm", Snout Spout first appeared as 'Hose Nose' in the She-Ra: Princess of Power episode "Small Problems", then under his correct name in two additional episodes and the Christmas Special. Rio Blast and Extendar did not appear in Filmation; though Colonel Blast, a prototype version of Rio Blast, was seen in the She-Ra episode "The Wizard". Rio Blast was featured in his accompanying mini-comic "The Fastest Draw in the Universe", while Extendar appeared in several of the fifth wave of mini-comics.)

The Evil Horde would gain additional figures with Multi-Bot, the "evil robot of a thousand bodies" (similar to the prior Modulok figure with interchangeable body-parts), the "transforming evil warrior vehicle" Dragstor (with a wheel on his chest and a rip-cord to send the figure racing across the floor), and a Horde Trooper, the only generic troop/soldier figures of the toy line, with a collapsable torso and the tagline "Evil Horde collapsing robot". (Note: Horde Troopers were ubiquitous in most forms Horde-related media, with the accompanying mini-comic "The Hordes of Hordak" featuring them specifically. Dragstor and Extendar were introduced in the mini-comic "The Warrior Machine" as victims of cybernetic Horde experiments. While Multi-Bot was introduced as a creation of Modulok in the mini-comic "The Menace of Multi-Bot", and unlike Dragstor and Extendar, did appear in a few episodes of She-Ra: Princess of Power as well as the Christmas Special.) The Evil Horde also obtained their first vehicle/creature hybrids in the toy line, with "the evil insectoid steed" Mantisaur, and Monstroid "the ultimate battling monster". Another Horde play-set was added early in 1986, the Slime Pit, an "evil pit of gruesome ooze"; which came with a canister of green slime to pour into a dinosaur-like skull, which then oozed out onto an action figure that was trapped in the 'Pit' by a giant claw. (Note: Additional canisters of "The Evil Horde Slime" were also sold separately. The Slime Pit featured a pack-in mini-comic entitled "Escape From the Slime Pit!", in which Hordak's slime turned living beings into his zombie-like slaves. The Slime Pit was designed by Ted Mayer with box art by William George.)

The Horde's "ruthless leader" Hordak would be released in a new golden-armoured deluxe form as 'Hurricane' Hordak with "wicked whirling weapons"; while the two mainstays of the toy line, He-Man and Skeletor would also receive deluxe figures with new "arm-swinging action" and weapons in the form of 'Flying Fists' He-Man, and 'Terror Claws' Skeletor. (Note: These new weapons for the deluxe figures were introduced in the accompanying mini-comics "The Flying Fists of Power" for 'Flying Fists' He-Man, "The Terror Claws Strike" for 'Terror Claws' Skeletor, and "Between a Rock and a Hard Place" for 'Hurricane' Hordak. Like previous deluxe figures, the new weapons and designs did not feature in any of the Filmation series.)

The mini-comics released with these later waves of action figures would continue to introduce new characters, creatures and vehicles, progressing the Masters of the Universe story beyond what had been seen in either Filmation series (as would Marvel's Star Comics, the UK London Editions Comics, and Germany's Ehapa Comics). (Note: Steven Grant wrote several of fifth and sixth wave of mini-comics, with Lee Nordling remaining on as editor. Other art and writing contributors included Jim Mitchell, Bruce Timm, Red Grant, Tim Kilpin, Eric Frydler, Mike Vosburg, Larry Houston, Phil White, Tom Luth, Charles Simpson, Stan Sakai, Chris Carlson and more.) One of the main storylines for the post-Filmation era, was the introduction of a new major villain faction known as the Snake Men; first appearing in the mini-comic "King of the Snake Men". The "dreadful disguised leader of the Snake Men" King Hiss would make his debut, with two characters that had previously appeared as members of the Horde in the She-Ra: Princess of Power animated series: Tung Lashor, the "evil tongue-shooting Snake Men creature", and Rattlor the "evil Snake Men creature with the quick-strike head". (Note: The Snake Men (apart from Kobra Khan) would all feature large Snake Men logos above their names and taglines on their blister cards. Some of the other figures would also begin to feature additional artwork (by William George, and later Bruce Timm) on the front of their blisters cards more regularly from this wave onwards.) As depicted in the mini-comics, Skeletor's former Evil Warrior, Kobra Khan, would join Rattlor and Tung Lashor under the leadership of the ancient Eternian King Hiss; whose Snake Men army rose from Eternia's past, joining forces with Skeletor to once again rule Eternia. (Note: The Snake Men story would continue in the mini-Comic "Snake Attack!", while additional Snake Men were added to the roster the following year in the form of Sssqueeze and Snake Face in the mini-comic "Revenge of the Snake Men".)

Another major mini-comic storyline of this period included the introduction of the three-towered fortress of Eternia in the mini-comic, "The Ultimate Battleground". (Note: "The Ultimate Battleground" mini-comic was packed-in with the Eternia play-set, with the box art by William George. George would provide most box art during these finals waves (apart from Joe Chiodo who did the artwork for Mantisaur, and Warren Hile on the later 'Powers of Grayskull' Dinosaurs).) Eternia would debut as a massive final play-set for the MOTU toy line during the Christmas season late in 1986. The 'Eternia' play-set stood as one of the biggest play sets ever released (for any toy line), complete with a motorized monorail circling the three towers.

Also that same year, "the land and sky disc launcher" Blasterhawk, and "the road rocket" Laser Bolt were made for He-Man's heroic warriors; while Skeletor gained a "dragonfly attack vehicle" known as the Fright Fighter. At a less expensive price point, three accessory packs of smaller vehicles and weapons were produced, which consisted of the Megalaser, Jet Sled, and Stilt Stalkers. (Note: These smaller accessories were released on blister cards similar to the action figures. The Jet Sled would also be released in a rare gift set with the original He-Man; while other gift sets from this era include a 'Flying Fists' He-Man and 'Terror Claws' Skeletor two-pack, as well as the original Hordak figure packed-in with Mantisaur.) Following the increased popularity of transforming toys at the time (such as Hasbro's Transformers and Tonka's GoBots), several small transforming egg-shaped creatures, known as Meteorbs, were added late into the line in 1986 as well. (Note: The Meteorbs were adapted into the Masters of the Universe toy-line from Japanese transforming eggs from Bandai called Tamagoras. Re-dubbed as "Comet Creatures That Transform", they included the Heroic Meteorbs: Tuskor, Cometroid, Astro Lion, Comet Cat and Ty-Grrr; as well as the Evil Meteorbs: Orbear, Rhinorb, Crocobite, Dinosorb and Gore-illa. Two of the Meteorbs, Comet Cat and Dinosorb, had previously appeared in the She-Ra: Princess of Power episode "Assault on the Hive"; while both factions of the Meteorbs appeared in their entirety in the second issue of Marvel's Star Comics series.)

The sixth series of action figures in 1987 would finally include action figures for the longtime MOTU staple characters King Randor, the "heroic ruler of Eternia", and the "heroic guardian of Castle Grayskull", the Sorceress. However, as with the previous wave, the 1987 mini-comics would continue on the adventures past the two Filmation animated series, introducing new characters not seen in the cartoon, such as the "heroic master of capture" Clamp Champ, and two spinning-top-like Energy Zoids: the "heroic master of hyper-spin" Rotar and the "evil speed twisting robot" Twistoid. The Snake Men would be joined in wave six by the "evil long-armed viper" Sssqueeze, and the Medusa-like Snake-Face, the "most gruesome of the Snake Men"; while the Horde would gain Mosquitor, the "evil energy-draining insectoid", and a new version of the "ruthless leader" Hordak in the form of "Buzz-Saw" Hordak, with a "blaster blade" that would shoot out of the figure's chest.

After receiving no new additions in the previous wave, Skeletor's Evil Warriors would increase their ranks with Blast-Attak, a "blast-apart robotic warrior" that would literally blast-apart using a trigger cable, the "evil ninja warrior" Ninjor, a re-release of the 2nd wave figure Faker, and the "evil ghost of Skeletor" Scare Glow, that would glow in the dark. A few deluxe action figure accessories were released late in 1987 as well: consisting of the Beam Blaster and Artilleray set, Scubattack, Tower Tools, and the Cliff Climber.

Also late into the line in 1987 were three new characters from the Masters of the Universe live-action movie: Blade, the "evil masters of swords", Saurod an armoured "evil spark-shooting reptile", and the dwarf-like inventor Gwildor, the "heroic creator of the Cosmic Key". These characters' entry into the MOTU mythos was explained in one of the last original mini-comics entitled, "The Cosmic Key".

==== Masters of the Universe live-action film (1987) ====
In 1987, a live-action He-Man film was made by Cannon Films titled Masters of the Universe, released in the United States on August 7, 1987. The film was directed by Gary Goddard and starred Dolph Lundgren in the title role of He-Man, Frank Langella as Skeletor, with Courteney Cox, Robert Duncan McNeill, and James Tolkan in supporting roles (as Julie Winston, Kevin Corrigan, and Detective Lubic, respectively). The other characters from the original cartoon to appear in the film are Evil-Lyn (Meg Foster), Man-At-Arms (Jon Cypher), Teela (Chelsea Field), Beast Man (Tony Carroll), and the Sorceress (Christina Pickles). A new character, Gwildor (Billy Barty), is included in place of Orko, as the special effects of the time were deemed insufficient and too costly. Skeletor's henchmen Blade (Anthony De Longis), Saurod (Pons Maar), and Karg (Robert Towers) were also introduced, in place of other more familiar villains from the established continuity, such as Tri-Klops, Mer-Man, and Trap Jaw.

In the film, Skeletor has finally conquered Eternia after stealing the Cosmic Key from the locksmith Gwildor, allowing him to gain entry into Castle Grayskull and imprison the Sorceress. The heroes He-Man, Man-At-Arms, and Teela are joined by Gwildor and escape to the planet Earth using Gwildor's prototype Cosmic Key. Stranded on Earth, they are faced with the task of retrieving their Cosmic Key (which has fallen into the hands of the unwitting humans Julie Winston and Kevin Corrigan) and returning to Eternia, before Skeletor can gain the full power of Castle Grayskull. Skeletor sends his minions to Earth with the mission of recovering the Cosmic Key prototype, as the war between good and evil is transferred to Earth, before returning to Eternia for a final battle between He-Man and a golden-clad godlike Skeletor in the film's climax.

Numerous parts of the previously accepted history of the series are omitted in the film, including all references to Prince Adam, Battle Cat, Orko, King Randor, and Queen Marlena. Many reviews of the motion picture criticized its departures from the cartoon, although the movie was produced as an adaptation of the toys only, with Filmation having no involvement in the film. It is also implied that Castle Grayskull itself is the ruling point of Eternia rather than any royal city. The story concentrates more on the science-fiction elements of the franchise rather than the fantasy and the majority of the story takes place on Earth rather than on the world of Eternia. Also departing from all other depictions, He-Man uses a gun in some scenes, instead of his Power Sword, and he is rarely shown displaying his superhuman strength in the film. Although He-Man twice utters his catchphrase "I have the power!" while holding the sword aloft in the iconic manner, he does omit the prefacing clause "By the power of Grayskull".

The film was a critical and commercial failure, and received generally negative reviews from critics.

Although Mattel had hoped that the movie would boost sales of the toy line, it instead had little effect on the line's falling sales, and the MOTU toy line was finally discontinued in early 1988 under mounting financial difficulties. A sequel to the film was written, but by 1989 Cannon Films was in such severe financial troubles that it could no longer afford to pay the license fees to Mattel. Due to film's poor reception, thus the script was transformed into the action film Cyborg, starring Jean-Claude Van Damme.

==== The Powers of Grayskull and the end of the original toy line (1987–1988) ====
A proposed exploration of the distant past of Eternia, dubbed "Preternia", formed the basis of what was meant to be the next incarnation of the toy line, titled "The Powers of Grayskull". However only a few toys were ever released in new "Powers of Grayskull" packaging. The first to appear on shelves under the new branding in 1987 were three hybrid mechanical/dinosaur creatures: Turbodactyl, the "heroic reptile with 'jet' wings" (in the form of a Pterodactyl); Bionatops, the "heroic bionic dinosaur" (in the form of a Triceratops), and Tyrantisaurus Rex, "the most terrifying dinosaur in the land of Preternia" (in the form of a purple Tyrannosaurus). Two rare 'giant figures' also found limited release in a few European markets under the "Powers of Grayskull" banner in 1988. Standing about 17 inches tall (as opposed to the standard 5.5 inch MOTU action figure), with rooted doll-like hair, was Tytus the "heroic giant warlord", and Megator, the "evil giant destroyer".

The Powers of Grayskull storyline began in the final MOTU mini-comic of the original toy line, titled '"The Powers of Grayskull—The Legend Begins!", which was intended as the first of a three-part series; however, only this inaugural issue was released. The mini-comic brought He-Man into Eternia's ancient past, followed by Skeletor, to encounter the Preternia versions of King Hiss and his Snake Men (who was serving a mysterious "Unnamed One"). This first (and only) comic in the series culminated with a shadowy introduction to "the Greatest Sorcerer of all". This sorcerer was to be revealed as He-Ro, an ancestor of He-Man, raised by his mentor Eldor (prototype figures for both of these characters would appear in catalogues and promotional material for the 'Powers of Grayskull', but were never put into production). According to the mini-comic writers, it was intended that the central antagonist to oppose He-Man and He-Ro would be Keldor, a character revealed similarly late in the line to have been He-Man's uncle (and strongly hinted to have been the former identity of Skeletor). (Note: Whether or not Keldor was also supposed to be the "Unnamed One" that King Hiss would serve is not clear. Although in an interview writer Steven Grant vaguely recalls that the intention was that the Unnamed One would be a greater evil who, as the Emperor was to Darth Vader, was intended to be the one who caused Keldor to become Skeletor. The He-Man and the Masters of the Universe reboot in 2002, would fully introduce Keldor as the uncle of Adam/He-Man into MOTU lore.)

Though effectively over in North America by the end of 1987, the original Masters of the Universe toy line had two more European-only releases in Italy and Spain in 1988, with the final action figures being light-emitting "Laser Power" and "Laser Light" battery-powered versions of He-Man and Skeletor (in which the figures would bear somewhat more of a resemblance to their live-action movie counterparts). Further action figures, creatures and vehicles were proposed, leading to working prototypes for concepts such as the Evil Robot, Gigantisaur, the Gyrattacker and others, but were never produced. (Note: Six additional figures were initially planned as part of the 1988 line; but remained only as concepts, entirely created from pre-existing parts, never making it to the prototype stage. Apart from the character Strobo (who appeared in the Fall 1988 MOTU Magazine comic), the other concept figures: Terroar, Plasmar, Lord Gr'Asp, Slamurai and the Snake Trooper were not given names until they were eventually released as exclusives in the Masters of the Universe Classics line from 2017 to 2019.)

=== MOTU – Other comics, books, games and media (1983–1990) ===
==== Marvel comics, daily newspaper strips, and fan-club magazines (1985–1988) ====
In the years after the animated series ended, generally going along with the established Filmation continuity, Marvel Comics would release a younger-skewing Star Comics Masters of the Universe series that ran from 1986 to 1988 bimonthly and produced 13 issues; featuring many of the later characters introduced in the toy line, as well as new ones such as Lieutenant Andra.

Apart from the standard comic-book format, there was a He-Man and the Masters of the Universe Magazine, a U.S.-based fan-club magazine featuring puzzles, fan letters, feature stories, and comic strips (running 16 issues, 1985–88; She-Ra also with a similar magazine, running six issues). This magazine series featured well-rendered covers and posters by artist Earl Norem and a character design contest, with the winner, Nathan Bitner, revealed in the spring 1986 issue. Bitner's creation, Fearless Photog, was never realized in the 1980s and an action figure was not produced until the Masters of the Universe Classics collector's toy line in 2012.

Daily Masters of the Universe comic strips were also in newspaper syndication from 1985 until 1989. The strips were primarily written by Chris Weber and edited by Karen Willson, with distribution in the U.S. and worldwide in countries such as Brazil, India, Greece, and the former Yugoslavia. The newspaper strips were generally lesser known to the wider fan base until 1,639 of the 1,674 daily strips were finally collected in hardcover format with He-Man and the Masters of the Universe: The Newspaper Comic Strips, released by Dark Horse Books in 2017.

==== International publications (1983–1990) ====
Various comics and magazines containing Masters of the Universe–related content were also released outside the United States, in the United Kingdom, Germany, France (as Musclor et les Maîtres de l'univers), Finland, Argentina, Brazil, Spain, Italy, and several other countries in the late 1980s. One of the most notable was produced by Egmont's London Editions in the United Kingdom, which published 72 issues biweekly of their By The Power Of Grayskull...Masters Of The Universe comic magazine headed by Brian Clarke from 1986 to 1988.

Original comic-book content was created in Germany as well, first by Interpart/Condor for 18 issues from 1984 to 1987, then in Egmont's Ehapa Masters of the Universe comics for 21 issues from 1987 to 1989, with promotional content also appearing in several German Micky Maus comics from the time period. Both the German and British comics were often translated to provide content for other countries (although Italy's Più and Magic Boy magazines provided some original material, as did various South American publishers, notably Estrela and Editora Abril in Brazil). In addition, a few promotional comics and mini comics were also produced by Mattel for various European department stores, often featuring reworked versions of existing comic stories, with few exceptions.

==== Children's books (1983–1990) ====
Masters of the Universe and the Princess of Power featured in many children's books from the 1980s, with one of the main producers of these titles, Golden Books, publishing several series of hard and softcover children's books from 1983 to 1986. The first few releases of the Golden books material is more in line with the early Mattel mini comics, with the later books following the Filmation cartoon series. New elements were also introduced by Golden Books, notably the character of Goat-Man in the book Secret of the Dragon's Egg in 1985. World I.P. also produced annual Masters of the Universe and Princess of Power storybooks in the UK from 1984 until the New Adventures line in 1990. Most World I.P. storybooks would loosely follow the established Filmation continuity, although the 1984 annual edition was written in a pre-Filmation style, naming prominent characters Orko and King Randor as "Gorpo" and "King Miro", respectively. Euredif France produced several Maîtres de l'Univers volumes as well, almost all of them directly based on various episodes of Filmation's He-Man and the Masters of the Universe series. Also notable in the 1980s were the various combination book, record, and cassette tape read-along adventure stories. These included many small hardcover book and cassette tapes produced by Ladybird Books out of the UK, several record and tape read-along book sets from Kid Stuff Records in the U.S., and two book and audio adventures by Mattel, packed in with a rare action-figure two-pack and with the Point Dread and Talon Fighter playset.

==== Games, audio plays, Power Tour, and other media (1983–1988) ====
Several video game adaptations of the franchise were released from 1983 through to 1987. Masters of the Universe: The Power of He-Man was released by Intellivision for Atari 2600 and Intellivision in 1983. Two games, Masters of the Universe: The Arcade Game and Masters of the Universe: The Super Adventure, were developed by Adventure Soft and released by U.S. Gold for Amstrad CPC, BBC Micro, Commodore 64, and ZX Spectrum in 1987, although the Commodore 64 version of Masters of the Universe: The Arcade Game was retitled Masters of the Universe: The Ilearth Stone. A video game based on the 1987 live-action movie, Masters of the Universe: The Movie, was released by Gremlin Graphics for Amstrad CPC, Commodore 64, MSX, and ZX Spectrum also in 1987. Additionally, various Masters of the Universe board games were released throughout the 1980s, and role-playing game publisher FASA produced The Masters of the Universe Role Playing Game in 1985 with sets of die-cast miniatures created by Grenadier Models.

Throughout the 1980s, a wide array of He-Man merchandise was released, including coloring books, activity books, Panini Sticker books, toothbrush holders, costumes, bed sheets, and many other items. Several read-along audio plays were created by Kid Stuff and by Pickwick/Ladybird in the United Kingdom. Notably, a complete Masters of the Universe audio-play adventure LP record was released by Kid Stuff Records in 1983, written and produced by John Braden, with a new He-Man theme song and original voice acting.

Also notable were a series of audio plays, released on cassette tapes in Germany by Europa from 1984 to 1988, selling over 4.6 million copies. The series consisted of 37 episodes of more than 40 minutes in length, each on their own tape, with an additional 10 Princess of Power cassettes, and 3 special promotional episodes. Though presenting a distinct continuity, the audio plays would continue to add to the expanding Masters of the Universe mythos, introducing the world of Anti-Eternia, with an evil alternate universe version of He-Man.

Home video releases of Filmation's animated series were produced by RCA/Columbia on VHS and Betamax for 11 volumes with red framed box art, before switching to their Magic Window brand with The Secret of the Sword movie in 1985, for 14 additional He-Man and the Masters of the Universe volumes, 12 She-Ra: Princess of Power VHS releases and 2 LaserDiscs. Two of these tapes were turned into feature-length compilations of episodes titled "The Greatest Adventure of All", and "Skeletor's Revenge", with new animated segments featuring the Sorceress and Skeletor respectively joining the episodes together. Golden Books, Germany's Ocean and Select, and various others also released Masters of the Universe video content in the 1980s.

A Masters of the Universe "Power Tour" live stage show toured across the United States and Canada in 1987, with 19 consecutive performances at New York's Radio City Music Hall. Directed by Tony Christopher, husband-and-wife team Jack and Leslie Wadsworth portrayed He-Man and She-Ra, while Khalos Planchart and Eric Van Baars played lead villains Hordak and Skeletor, respectively. The production also featured lesser used characters such as Rio-Blast, Clamp-Champ, Snout-Spout, Rokkon, Ninjor, Blast-Attak, and songs by an original character, Songster (performed by Doug Howard).

== History of the franchise: 1990s, 2000s and 2010s revivals ==
=== New Adventures and He-Man revival ===
==== The New Adventures of He-Man animated series (1990–1991) ====
The New Adventures animated series

In 1990, a couple of years after the ending of the original Masters of the Universe product line, a second He-Man animated series titled The New Adventures of He-Man was created by Jetlag Productions to promote Mattel's short-lived attempt to revive the MOTU brand with a new toy line, simply titled He-Man. The new series is radically different from the original fantasy-oriented milieu, shifting to an almost purely science-fiction setting that sees He-Man transported to the futuristic planet of Primus. He-Man (with a new, more slender appearance and sporting a ponytail; voiced by Doug Parker) leads the heroic Galactic Guardians; while Skeletor (also with a completely new look; voiced by Campbell Lane), bases himself on the mutant world of Denebria, forming an alliance with Flogg and his band of Evil Mutants, who are hellbent on conquering Primus for themselves. The series contains continuity links to the original Masters of the Universe and was intended as a continuation of the existing mythology, although some fans see it as a separate canon from the original series due to the differences in style and character portrayal.

Other than He-Man and Skeletor, the Sorceress of Castle Grayskull is the only character from the original series to make regular appearances in the new series, acting as a spiritual guide to He-Man from afar. Other established characters featured in the pilot episode, "A New Beginning", include King Randor and Queen Marlena, who finally learn of the dual identity of Prince Adam and He-Man. Teela also makes a later appearance in the series in the episode "Once Upon a Time", although she bears little resemblance to her former Filmation counterpart.

Main characters introduced in this series are He-Man's new allies: the wise sage Master Sebrian, his assistant Mara, and the lead Galactic Guardians Captain Hydron and Flipshot. Other frequently appearing heroic characters include the young shepherd girl Drissi, her little brother Caz, the scientists (Alcon, Gepple, Krex, and Meldoc), the robots Gleep and UR, Grot the gardener, councilman Werban, the cyclops Meliac, and the remaining Galactic Guardians: Sagitar, Tuskador, Spinwit, and Artilla; with the final members Kayo, Vizor, and Nocturna rarely featuring in the show (although they did appear in the comics and series intro). Skeletor's allies in Flogg's band of Evil Mutants consist mainly of Flogg's incompetent second-in-command Slush-Head, Skeletor's new love interest Crita, and other mutants such as Quakke, Staghorn, B.H., Hoove, Karatti, Optik, and Lizorr.

The New Adventures of He-Man cartoon series first aired September 17, 1990, lasting 65 episodes, until the episode "The Final Invasion", which aired on December 14, 1990, and, unlike Filmation, did provide some closure to the series. The majority of the cartoon episodes were written by Jack Olesker, resulting in a somewhat tighter continuity than the prior series.

==== He-Man toy line (1989–1992) ====
The He-Man toy line, debuting in 1989, a year earlier than the animated series, featured four waves of action figures (produced in slightly smaller scale to the previous line); totaling 28 distinct figures in all, with seven vehicles, two playsets, and two accessory items. Neither The New Adventures animated series or toy line proved nearly as popular as the originals, and the line ended with little fanfare in 1992.

He-Man series was also featured in its own series of four mini comics and in a monthly comic magazine titled He-Man Adventure, which ran for about six issues, before returning to adventures on Eternia and was published by Egmont's London Editions Magazines in the UK; World I.P. also produced a New Adventures–themed annual in 1990. These publications differed somewhat from the animated series with the addition of the character Darius (who did not appear in the cartoon series) in a major role as leader of the Galactic Council; the transition of the "Power of Castle Grayskull" into the Starship Eternia; and several of the figures sporting alternate names in some media and toy-line releases, such as Flipshot as Icarius, Flogg as Brakk, and Slush-Head as Kalamarr.

=== He-Man on hiatus: Proposed series, commemorative releases and other media (1993–2001) ===
The Masters of the Universe franchise would not produce any new media for almost a decade, although at least two new series were proposed. Both were to feature alternate versions of He-Ro (now as the son of He-Man), as a sequels to the original animated series. One of which was pitched by Lou Scheimer to DIC Entertainment in 1996, but remained unproduced.

During this hiatus, Masters of the Universe also began a following on the early days of the internet, with sites developed by Kevin Herbert (one of the first), Adam Tyner (with the Scrolls of Grayskull newsletter), Busta-Toons (with focus on the Filmation animated series), and many others; eventually ending up with the expansive He-Man.org site being created. Various popular internet memes were also created, with Masters of the Universe being reviewed by popular YouTube channels and parodies such as Unemployed Skeletor or Wil Wheaton's "Skeletor Reads Angry Tweets" segment. Masters of the Universe would also appear many times on the Adult Swim stop-motion comedy series Robot Chicken (which introduced a comedic character named Mo-Larr). Both He-Man and Skeletor remained in pop culture, and were mentioned on the long-running animated series The Simpsons on a few occasions.

In 2000, however, Mattel did act on the growing nostalgia for the 1980s action figures by rereleasing replicas of many of the figures, under the banner of the Masters of the Universe Commemorative line. BCI Eclipse LLC (and later Mill Creek Entertainment) would expand on this, later releasing all episodes of the Filmation He-Man and the Masters of the Universe on DVD in Region 1 in 2005/2006; followed by She-Ra: Princess of Power and JetLag's New Adventures of He-Man series. Each volume contained an extensive array of special features, including original documentaries produced for the DVD set that featured interviews from many series creators and writers such as Lou Scheimer, Larry DiTillio, Paul Dini, and others. On April 25, 2022, the complete series was released for the first time on DVD in the UK by Fabulous Films.

=== Early 2000s Masters of the Universe franchise relaunch ===
==== Masters of the Universe 200X toy lines (2002–2007) ====
In 2002, Mattel relaunched Masters of the Universe with a new toy line featuring sculpts designed by Four Horsemen Studios, to be followed by a new animated series (both later referred to as Masters of the Universe '200X'). The new toy line was made surprisingly faithful to the original line, with the characters gently "reimagined" and updated in terms of sculpting detail rather than radically reinterpreted. Sixty action figures were released in all, with 10 creature figures, seven vehicles, and three playsets (eight smaller-scale figures were also produced in a McDonald's Happy Meal promotion).

One point of contention for many fans of the original Masters toy line was the redesign of He-Man's Power Sword. According to Four Horsemen, this was due to their original re-sculpts being intended for a continuation of the original storyline in which Skeletor had obtained both halves of the Power Sword (hence the new Skeletor figure's dual blades with clear "good" and "evil" hilt designs), necessitating a new sword to be built by Man-At-Arms and endowed with the properties of the original by the Sorceress. However, Mattel decided to reboot the continuity for a new generation of children, and thus the "new" Power Sword design became the "original" version for the new continuity. Another issue was the overreliance on releasing alternate versions of He-Man (13 in total), Skeletor (10), Man-At-Arms (5), and a few other main characters, rather than further classic, reimagined, and original characters from the accompanying animated series (such as Randor, The Sorceress, Clawful, or Chief Carnivus, to name a few); making many of the non-He-Man or Skeletor figures hard to come by for both collectors and children. These factors likely contributed to the cancelation of the line in 2004 and ultimately not achieving the success of its 1980s counterpart.

The line's faithfulness to the original series made it very popular with collectors, however, suggesting it would have been better served as a collector-based line, akin to DC Direct. This theory was borne out in the wake of the discontinuation of the mass-market toy line, with NECA taking the rather unprecedented step of continuing the toy line through action-figure-size mini-statues scaled and sculpted to be aesthetically compatible for display alongside the Mattel toys. NECA would produce 22 "staction figures" in total, allowing fans to fill in their collections with other Four Horsemen redesigned characters that had yet to be produced as figures when the toy line was canceled. According to a December 8, 2005, interview with a Mattel representative on he-man.org, NECA offered to produce fully articulated action figures for Mattel without taking any credit, but permission was denied. Instead, NECA was only permitted to produce non-articulated statues, which they did from 2005 to 2007.

==== He-Man and the Masters of the Universe – 2002 animated series (2002–2004) ====
A new animated series was produced to accompany the toy line, made by Mike Young Productions and lasting for 39 episodes, with the series making its premiere on Cartoon Network's Toonami on August 16, 2002, and airing its final episode on January 10, 2004. This series involved much tighter continuity and a somewhat greater depth of characterization than its Filmation predecessor. A similar but slightly modified premise to the original Filmation series, this version of He-Man (voiced by Cam Clarke, with Prince Adam portrayed as physically younger and smaller than He-Man) was part of an ensemble of Eternian heroes/protectors known officially as "The Masters of the Universe". Under the leadership of Man-At-Arms (voiced by Garry Chalk), this team originally consisted of He-Man/Adam (with his pet Cringer/Battle Cat, no longer able to speak), Teela, Orko, Stratos, Ram-Man, Mekaneck, and Man-E-Faces, and later joined by Buzz-Off, Roboto, and Sy-Klone. King Randor was now a general (rather than king, from an Eternian royal lineage), pronounced ruler of Eternia by the Elders of the Hall of Wisdom, which have gone into hiding inside the depths of Castle Grayskull. Skeletor (voiced by Brian Dobson), now confirmed as Randor's brother Keldor, finally breaks through the great barrier wall (after decades of trying) and attacks The Masters with his evil forces, mainly consisting of Evil-Lynn, Beast-Man, Mer-Man, Trap-Jaw (now a cybernetically repaired henchman, formerly known as Kronis), Tri-Klops (now an inventor/scientist, somewhat akin to an evil Man-At-Arms), Claw-ful (now a very large and extremely dim-witted thug), and Whiplash (now also of larger size and of the subterranean Caligar race). Backstories of occasional characters such as Fisto, Moss-Man, Webstor, Zodak (regarded a different character as opposed to the earlier Zodac), Two-Bad (portrayed as two bounty hunters known as Tuvar and Baddhra, magically combined into one being by Skeletor's magic), and Stinkor (finally making an appearance in cartoon continuity as the mutated form of Odiphus) are all expanded upon. On-and-off villains Count Marzo and Evilseed return, while new characters such as Dekker, Carnivus, Ceratus, Lord Dactys, Prahvus, the Faceless One, and the giants Chadzar, Belzar, and Azdar are also introduced in this series.

The series was originally title He-Man and the Masters of the Universe like the original 1983 series, being retitled Masters of the Universe vs. the Snake-Men towards the end of the first season, in addition sidelining Skeletor as chief villain in favor of King Hiss, leader of the reptilian Snake Men (Kobra-Kahn, General Rattlor, Tung-Lashor, Snake-Face, and Sssqueeze), with He-Man and many of the characters now bearing a new "Snake-Armor" look. He-Man's ancestor King Grayskull and his Sorceress wife Veena also debuted in this season against his nemesis Hordak (now an ancient sorcerer). Hordak and the Evil Horde were to be the main antagonists for the third season if the show had continued, but it was not renewed. The 40th and final episode was produced as a comic-book "special feature" on the last DVD set of the series, which was part of a three-volume release, originally by BCI Eclipse in 2008 (and later in a collected release by Mill Creek Entertainment in 2009 and 2012).

==== Masters of the Universe 200X comics (2002–2005) ====
From 2002 to 2005, Image Comics and MVCreations published several series of comics and one-shots that mirrored tales of Masters of the Universe; the comic series elaborated and added to the mythos by introducing characters that never appeared in the 39 episodes of the television series. The first issues were seen in the summer of 2002 in the form of special promotional/preview issues, with three miniseries continuing on after: "The Shards of Darkness" in fall 2002, followed by "Dark Reflections" and "Rise of the Snake Men" in 2003. After delving into the backstories of Skeletor's henchmen Beast-Man, Mer-Man, Trap-Jaw, and Tri-Klops in a four-issue "Icons of Evil" series, a short-lived ongoing series, solely produced by MVC, continued on for eight issues in 2004. Along with these, a handful of special or "pack-in" one-shots and trade paperback collected volumes were also produced.

==== MOTU 200X video games (2002–2005) ====
A video game based on the '200X' Masters of the Universe series, titled He-Man: Power of Grayskull, was developed by Taniko and published by TDK Mediactive in October 2002 for the Game Boy Advance, which also featured an introductory mini comic. A follow-up developed by Savage Entertainment and published by Midas Interactive Entertainment, He-Man: Defender of Grayskull, was released for PlayStation 2 in February 2005.

=== Collectors' toy lines and comics (2008–2020) ===
==== Masters of the Universe Classics toy line (2008–2016) ====
In 2007, a new incarnation of Masters of the Universe was announced, with the first action figure, King Grayskull, released at San Diego Comic-Con in 2008. Originally conceived as an extension of the 200X toy line, this new Classics line was aimed primarily at the adult toy collector market with a 7″ scale, and were often available only through subscriptions (from MattyCollector).

Updated versions of previous figures were sculpted by the Four Horsemen, as well as characters that had never before appeared in action figure form, such as Filmation's Queen Marlena, Fang-Man, Lizard-Man, Count Marzo, Granamyr, and She-Ra: Princess of Power's Adora, Madame Razz, Scorpia, Shadow Weaver and Sea Hawk. The New Adventures of He-Man' and the Mike Young Productions 200X series also received previously un-produced figures such as Mara, Crita, Chief Carnivus, Keldor and Dekker.

As the line progressed, characters from all versions of MOTU lore were included, from prototypes, concept and box art such as He-Ro, Eldor, Demo-Man, Gygor and Sky High to characters from books, comics, and magazines like Despara, Strobo, Goat-Man, Geldor and the long-awaited Fearless Photog. There were also newly created characters, exclusive to the Classics toy line, such as Draego-Man, Cy-Chop, Castle Grayskullman, Sir Laser-Lot and the Mighty Spector. Figures were also released in two-packs with corresponding Superheroes and villains from the DC Comics Universe.

Masters of the Universe Classics surpassed the original 1980s toy line in terms of length, running continuously for seven years with more than 150 different figures produced. In 2016, Mattel ended production on the MOTU Classics and MattyCollector's Club Grayskull series, with the production company Super7 taking over the Masters of the Universe license and the remainder of the Classics series.

==== MOTU Classics mini-comics (2012–2015) ====
Starting in 2012, Dark Horse Comics produced three mini-comics included in Mattel's Masters of the Universe Classics line of toys. The Dark Horse mini-comics begin a new story set in the "Classics" timeline, but based on the "The Powers of Grayskull The Legend Begins" mini-comic from the 1980s, re-telling and completing the previously unfinished three part saga. Writer Tim Seeley stated that these comics were intended to blend the different He-Man continuities and select the best stories and ideas from MOTU history.

DC Comics took over the Masters of the Universe Classics mini-comics from Dark Horse in 2013, publishing five more mini comics, with stories from Scott Neitlich (artwork by Wellinton Alves and Axel Giménez). These mini-comics provide a sequel to the 1986 mini-comic, "The Search for Keldor", proceed to join into the New Adventures of He-Man continuity, and bring in Dare (aka He-Ro II), from the proposed, but unmade "Son of He-Man" concept from the 1990s.

==== Super7 toy line continuation (2016–2020) ====
Super7 produced several 3¾" figures (in the style of the classic Kenner Star Wars action figures) and figures in the style of the M.U.S.C.L.E./Kinkeshi figures. Super7's releases included figures from their animation special The Curse of the Three Terrors, followed by the 7"-scale Masters of the Universe "Ultimates" line (while also providing a continuation of the prior Classics and Club Grayskull toy lines). Super7 also produced retro figures in the very similar form to the original 1980s toy line in 5½-inch scale; which included many 'Filmation' styled versions of the vintage figures (along with unreleased figures such as He-Ro and Eldor). Super7's final addition to the MOTU Classics toyline was a 'made to order' exclusive Snake Mountain playset in 2020.

==== Return to DC Comics (2012–2020) ====
A Masters of the Universe comic book series was relaunched by DC Comics in 2012, aimed at an older more mature audience than prior iterations of the franchise. First appearing as a series of digital comics, followed by a six-issue mini-series, as well as one-shot origin issues for He-Man, Skeletor and Hordak. After a crossover mini-series with superheroes from the DC Comics universe in 2013, an ongoing series ran for 19 issues through 2014, before being replaced by the "He-Man: The Eternity War" 15-issue series in 2015/2016. These issues brought forth a new backstory for She-Ra (as Despara), delved deeper into Skeletor's past and moved the storyline further along than previous entries, with Adam/He-Man succeeding his father on the Eternian throne, and Teela as the new guardian of Castle Grayskull.

DC and Mattel later produced He-Man/ThunderCats, a crossover with another heroic 1980s action figure line, ThunderCats, for six issues in 2016–2017, which also included crossover action-figures within the Masters of the Universe Origins line. A six-part crossover series with DC Comics' Injustice was released in 2018, with the final MOTU DC property, "He-Man and the Masters of the Multiverse" from November 2019 until May 2020, both written by Tim Seeley. This final series used elements from multiple sources in MOTU lore, including more obscure references such as the Tappers of Grayskull game app and Anti-Eternia He-Man from the German Europa audio cassettes from the 1980s.

=== She-Ra returns – She-Ra and the Princesses of Power (2018–2020) ===
On December 12, 2017, DreamWorks Animation SKG and Netflix announced a new reboot series based on She-Ra Princess of Power series from the 1980s. The series was executive produced by award-winning author, ND Stevenson (creator of Nimona and Lumberjanes). The series' first season of thirteen episodes was released on Netflix November 13, 2018.<r She-Ra Retake Comics |website=hemanworld.com |author=Atkin, John|date=December 17, 2014 |access-date=July 9, 2026}}ef name="IGN">Alex Gilyadov (May 18, 2018). "First Look at Netflix's She-Ra and the Princesses of Power". IGN.</ref> The DreamWorks series features a new animation style and alternate backstories for many of the characters, many of whom are presented as younger in age and with a more diverse makeup than in the previous 1980s Filmation series. Adora/She-Ra is again presented as a former member of the Horde, befriended by re-imagined versions of Glimmer and Bow (with new voice actors Aimee Carrero, Karen Fukuhara and Marcus Scribner, respectively). Under the direction of Glimmer's mother Queen Angella of Bright Moon, the three embark upon re-uniting the Princesses of Etheria, which include Perfuma, Mermista, Entrapta and Frosta, each with re-imagined characters as well. Also appearing in the series are Swift Wind (without the alter ego of Spirit and with a completely different take on the character's personality), Light Hope (as a female hologram generated by the "First Ones"), Sea Hawk (now presented as a more comical glory-seeking associate of Mermista), Castaspella (as the sister of Angella's husband King Micah), Madame Razz (as an older and confused forest dweller with knowledge of Mara, a prior "She-Ra"), Netossa and Spinnerella.

The evil Horde returns as the villainous overlords of Etheria, and although Hordak remains leader of the Horde, Catra is often presented as the primary antagonist (now voiced by AJ Michalka), with a much stronger relationship established between her and Adora. Shadow Weaver (Lorraine Toussaint) and Scorpia (Lauren Ash) also play prominent roles within the series, and cadets Lonnie, Rogelio and Kyle are introduced (possibly inspired by previous Filmation characters). Overarching galactic villain Horde Prime and a re-imagined shape-shifting Double Trouble enter the series in later seasons, and other previously established villains appearing in lesser roles are Admiral Scurvy, Tung Lashor, Grizzlor, Imp and Octavia. Although no longer directly linked to He-Man or the Masters of the Universe, Eternia, Castle Grayskull and Adora's kidnapping as a child are referenced.

Season two of She-Ra and the Princesses of Power was released on Netflix on April 26, 2019, with a shorter seven-episode run; soon followed by season three, on August 2, and season 4, on November 4 of that same year. While firmly establishing a new continuity, these seasons make further connections to previously established lore and characters, and include Geena Davis voicing the role of Huntara in season three. The series aired its fifth and final season on May 15, 2020. Several dolls, chapter books and graphic novels were also released in relation to this series in 2019 and 2020.

== Current and other recent Masters of the Universe properties ==
=== Netflix animated series (2021–2024) ===
==== Masters of the Universe: Revelation and Revolution (2021–2024) ====
In August 2019, Kevin Smith announced at the 2019 Power Con that he and Netflix were developing a new series titled Masters of the Universe: Revelation that was proposed to be a direct sequel to the original He-Man and the Masters of the Universe animated series.

On February 14, 2020, the full voice cast was confirmed, which included Mark Hamill providing the voice for Skeletor, Chris Wood voicing Prince Adam and He-Man, Sarah Michelle Gellar as Teela, and Lena Headey as Evil-Lyn. The series features many characters never before seen in animated form, such as Scareglow, Blast-Attak, Andra and He-Ro; incorporating a wide range of Masters of the Universe lore over its long history and varied incarnations.

The first 5 episodes made its debut on Netflix on July 23, 2021, with the remaining 5 releasing on November 23, 2021. A third season titled Masters of the Universe: Revolution premiered on Netflix in January 2024, concluding the series after 5 additional episodes.

==== He-Man and the Masters of the Universe – 2021 CGI revival ====
In December 2019, it was announced that Netflix would be developing a new Masters of the Universe series using CGI animation. Rob David developed the series, producing it alongside Adam Bonnett, Christopher Keenan, Jeff Matsuda and Susan Corbin, while Bryan Q. Miller served as the story editor on the series. Animation services were provided by House of Cool and CGCG Inc.

Aimed at a younger audience, the series featured an updated storyline and a new stylized take on the characters and the world of Eternia. It ran for three seasons with 26 episodes from September 2021 to August 2022, and was accompanied by a toyline from Mattel.

=== 2026 live-action reboot film and web series ===
==== Masters of the Universe 2026 film ====
A second live-action film based on the Masters of the Universe franchise was released on June 5, 2026 and directed by Travis Knight for Amazon MGM Studios and Mattel Films. The film depicts a ten-year-old Prince Adam sent to his mother's home planet of Earth and separated from his Power Sword. Once the sword is retrieved, Adam returns to Eternia two decades later to become He-Man, and team-up with his friends and allies against the evil forces of Skeletor.

Nicholas Galitzine stars as He-Man, Camila Mendes as Teela, Alison Brie as Evil-Lyn, Idris Elba as Man-at-Arms, and Jared Leto as Skeletor. (Note: Other cast members include James Purefoy as King Randor, Morena Baccarin as The Sorceress, Charlotte Riley as Queen Marlena, Jóhannes Haukur Jóhannesson as Fisto, Jon Xue Zhang as Ram-Man, James Wilkinson as Mekaneck, Stephen Adentan as Moss Man, Christiaan Bettridge as Dian, Sam C. Wilson as Trap Jaw, James Apps as Spikor, Hung Dante Dong as Karg, Kojo Attah as Tri-Klops and Hafthor Bjornsson as Goat Man.) Though praised by many fans and critics, the box office for the theatrical release proved to be disappointing, however the film reached the top spot globally on the Amazon Prime streaming service shortly after its' release to the platform on July 22, 2026.

===== Proposed films and development hell (2007–2023) =====
Since 2007, a reboot of Masters of the Universe had been in the works but went through development hell with various studios, directors and writers connected to the project. Originally Variety reported in 2007 that Grayskull: Masters of the Universe would be produced by Joel Silver, and written by Justin Marks, and employing visual special effects to a large degree, as was done with the 2007 war film 300. Warner Bros. announced in 2009 that John Stevenson, was slated to direct the upcoming feature with scripting duties by Evan Daugherty. In September 2009, Sony took over the rights from Warner Bros. after Mattel and Silver couldn't agree on creative direction for the film.

Sony and Escape Artists' Todd Black, Jason Blumenthal and Steve Tisch were now developing the project for Columbia, with screenwriters Mike Finch and Alex Litvak to draft a new script and Jon M. Chu was in talks to direct the film, but would later drop out. Other writers such as Richard Wenk, Terry Rossio, Christopher Yost and Jeff Wadlow were all mentioned as being in talks to write or rewrite the film for Sony. In 2016, it was reported that McG would direct the film and also oversee a rewrite of the latest script by Alex Litvak and Mike Finch. On June 24, 2016, Kellan Lutz tweeted on his Twitter page that he had a meeting with both McG and Mary Viola about taking the role of He-Man. McG commented on the film saying, "I think we want to honor the fan base, first and foremost, We also need to be cognizant of the incredible resonance of what Kevin Feige is doing with Marvel, and the balance of full-bodied entertainment. That it's both credible and emotional, action-packed, and the story of a hero's journey. It's the genesis of He-Man, it's the becoming of He-Man. We want it to be clicking on all cylinders in that regard. We're not going to stop until we get it right." On April 26, 2017, Sony confirmed that the film would finally be released on December 18, 2019. However, after the anncouncement, McG was no longer directing the film and it was reported that David S. Goyer had been brought in to write and direct, however, in 2018 he too stepped away.

In April 2018, another Variety report stated that Aaron and Adam Nee were set to direct the film, and in 2019 it was reported that Art Marcum and Matt Holloway would rewrite a new draft. Also in 2019, Noah Centineo stated that he was in talks to play He-Man and Sony announced that the film's release date was changed to March 5, 2021. Though by 2021, the film was taken off the release schedule and Centineo had exited the project.

On January 28, 2022, it was announced that Netflix had officially acquired the film from Sony and that Kyle Allen would now play He-Man. It was also revealed that David Callaham had written a new draft of the screenplay along with the Nee Brothers, while production was set to begin in 2023. On July 18, 2023, it was announced that Netflix has canceled the film and Mattel was looking for a new studio to buy the project. By the end of 2023, Amazon MGM Studios had officially acquired the rights to the film.

==== Masters of the Universe: Tales From Eternia – 2026 web series ====
On June 19, 2026, the 2D animated web series Masters of the Universe: Tales From Eternia was released on YouTube. The series of 20 short four minute episodes was produced by Mattel Studios in partnership with Snipple Animation.

=== Future and proposed properties ===
==== Proposed live-action She-Ra television series ====
On September 13, 2021, Amazon announced that a live-action She-Ra series is in development with DreamWorks Animation serving as an executive producer. The series will be a new, standalone story with no connections with Netflix's original animated series She-Ra and the Princesses of Power. It was announced that Nicole Kassell will direct the series and Heidi Schreck will serve as both a writer and executive producer.

=== Current Masters of the Universe toy lines ===
==== Masters of the Universe Chronicles and Core series (2026–present) ====
In conjunction with the 2026 live action movie, Mattel began producing action figures, vehicles and playsets in various scales for the film: Masters of the Universe Chronicles in a larger 1/12 6.5" scale, and the "Core" series in a 5" scale (slightly smaller in overall size than the traditional 5.5" Origins line, but with more detail).

==== Masters of the Universe Masterverse (2021–present) ====
Serving as a successor to the Masters of the Universe Classics line in the 7" scale, and in conjunction with the Masters of the Universe Revelation Netflix series, this line of premium Masters of the Universe Masterverse action figures debuted in 2021 and continues to be produced by Mattel, showcasing various incarnations of the series as well as a New Eternia line.

==== Masters of the Universe Origins (2019–present) ====
Mattel began producing Masters of the Universe action figures once again, debuting the Origins line at San Diego Comic-Con in 2019 with a Prince Adam and He-Man two-pack. The figures in the vintage 5.5" scale, but with more articulation, were designed to aspire to both adult collectors and children, with a retail release across the globe in 2020. The look of the playsets, vehicles and figures, along with the packaging is presented in the style of the original line from the 1980s and include all new mini-comics. The main line of Origins include 1980s Filmation cartoon inspired action figures, figures from the 200X animated series, the 2026 live-action movie, as well as figures based on concept art and entirely new creations. Mattel has also released an action figure crossover line combining Origins with the Teenage Mutant Ninja Turtles franchise, titled Turtles of Grayskull, as well as crossovers with ThunderCats, Transformers, WWE, Stranger Things and Rulers of the Sun.

==== Masters of the Universe Minis and other modern toylines (2013–present) ====
Along with the MOTU Classics series, MOTU Minis and Giants figures were produced from 2013 to 2015. Mattel would bring back the Minis line in 2020 with several waves of figures, multipacks and vehicles. Mega Construx would release Masters of the Universe themed building block figures and toys, beginning in 2017, including a Castle Grayskull set. Funko Pop has also produced Masters of the Universe themed characters since 2018, and highly detailed 1/6 and 1/12 scale figures have been released by Mondo since 2019. A Barbie Signature series of Masters of the Universe dolls was released by Mattel in conjunction with the 2026 live action movie.

=== Current MOTU comics, books, games and other recent media ===
==== Dark Horse comics (2021–present) ====
Dark Horse Comics released a prequel comic series to the Masters of the Universe Revelation animated series on Netflix, in 2021, as well as a follow-up miniseries for the animated sequel Masters of the Universe Revolution in 2024. Dark Horse continues to produce Masters of the Universe comics with an ongoing series, a tie-in mini-series related to the 2026 movie and a crossover with the Teenage Mutant Ninja Turtles, titled 'Turtles of Grayskull'.

==== Books, Manga and magazines (2015–present) ====
Dark Horse Books continues to produce various hardcover anthology books with collaborative efforts from Val Staples, James Eatock, Josh de Lioncourt, Danielle Gelehrter, Eric Marshall, Jukka Issakainen, David Clark, Aidan Cross, Leanne Hannah and others. Volumes include the "Art of He-Man and the Masters of the Universe," "He-Man and the Masters of the Universe Minicomic Collection," "He-Man and She-Ra: A Complete Guide to the Classic Animated Adventures," "He-Man and the Masters of the Universe: The Newspaper Comic Strips", "He-Man and the Masters of the Universe: A Character Guide and World Compendium." and "The Toys of He-Man and the Masters of the Universe". Hardcover books featuring more recent Masters of the Universe properties have also been produced for the Masterverse and Origins toy lines, Netflix's 2021 CGI animated series, the Revelation and Revolution series, as well as the 2026 movie.

Since 2019, Golden Books has produced He-Man, She-Ra and Skeletor themed children's books in their Little Golden Books series, and Scholastic has published graphic novels and chapter books for both She-Ra and the Princesses of Power and the 2021 He-Man and the Masters of the Universe CGI series. The 2021 CGI series also featured 'Tales of Eternia' books published by Amulet Books. In 2026 Mattel Press released the first Masters of the Universe young adult novel entitled "Teela: Daughter of Eternos", as well as children's books also related to the 2026 film.

TokyoPop is also producing a 'Legends of Eternia' Manga-style tie-in prequel series to the 2026 Masters of the Universe movie.

==== Video games (2012–present) ====
Throughout the 2010s and 2020s, several new video games based on the franchise were released. An Android and iOS game, He-Man: The Most Powerful Game in the Universe, was developed by GlitchSoft and published by Chillingo and Mattel in late 2012; later followed by 2016's He-Man Tappers of Grayskull by Animoca Brands for the same platforms (which also includes an updated She-Ra's Adventure version). That same year, Mattel published a Frima Studio developed game for its View-Master virtual reality headset for mobile devices. In 2025, two mobile games inspired by Revelation soft-launched: Gambit Games' card battler Battle for Eternia and Antler Interactive's horde survivor Guardians of Grayskull. On June 2, 2026, Mattel and Amber debuted the endless runner Skeletor: Until Next Time. Inspired by the new film, Amazon Game Studios and Bandit Island Games released the Legends Unite deck-building game for Amazon Luna on June 9, 2026.

On April 26, 2022, Mattel and Gamefam released a Roblox game titled He-Man and the Masters of the Universe: You have the Power (later renamed Combat Simulator) to promote the then ongoing Netflix series. A second Roblox game, Battle for Grayskull, themed around the 2026 movie, was launched in October of that year in partnership with Twin Atlas. Mattel and Loot Foundry similarly debuted the He-Man Heroes game through Fortnite Creative in August 2025. The franchise has had official collaborative appearances in Bloons Tower Defense 6, Call of Duty: Modern Warfare II, Fortnite, Funko Fusion, Hot Wheels Unleashed, Jetpack Joyride, Raid: Shadow Legends, Stumble Guys and Toy Soldiers: War Chest.

On August 19, 2025 Limited Run Games and Bitmap Bureau announced the side-scrolling beat 'em up He-Man and the Masters of the Universe: Dragon Pearl of Destruction for PlayStation 4, PlayStation 5, Xbox Series, Nintendo Switch, and Windows. The game is set for release on February 4, 2027.

==== Other MOTU media (2017–present) ====
Masters of the Universe was featured in the third episode of the first season of the Netflix series The Toys That Made Us in 2017 and in 2018 with the release of the Power of Grayskull: The Definitive History of He-Man and the Masters of the Universe documentary, also on Netflix.
