= Masters of the Universe: The Movie =

1987 video game

- Box art for the Amstrad CPC version
- Developer: Gremlin Graphics
- Publisher: Gremlin Graphics
- Designer: Rob Toone
- Programmer: Christian P. Shrigley
- Artist: Terry Lloyd
- Composer: Ben Daglish
- Platforms: Amstrad CPC; Commodore 64; MSX; ZX Spectrum
- Release: EU: 1987
- Genres: Action-adventure game Run and gun
- Mode: Single-player

Masters of the Universe: The Movie is an action-adventure game developed by Gremlin Graphics, and published in 1987. It is based on the American film Masters of the Universe (1987), directed by Gary Goddard. The film and the game are part of the Masters of the Universe media franchise.

A promotional photo of Dolph Lundgren as He-Man and Frank Langella as Skeletor illustrates the video game packaging, which is taken from promotional artwork drawn and painted by Drew Struzan. The MSX version of the game is titled Masters of the Universe.

Two other Masters of the Universe video games were published in the same year: Masters of the Universe: The Arcade Game and Masters of the Universe: The Super Adventure.

== See also ==
- 1987 in video gaming
