= DC Universe vs. Masters of the Universe =

2013 comic book crossover series

Publication information
- Publisher: DC Comics
- Format: Limited series
- Publication date: August 2013 – January 2014
- No. of issues: 6
- Main character(s): Justice League; Masters of the Universe

Creative team
- Written by: Keith Giffen
- Artist: Dexter Soy

DC Universe vs. Masters of the Universe is a fictional 2013 comic book intercompany crossover series featuring DC Comics' Justice League and Mattel's Masters of the Universe, written by Keith Giffen with art by Dexter Soy published by DC Comics.

== Reception ==
DC Universe vs. Masters of the Universe had mostly positive reviews.
