= Scooby-Doo! Who's Watching Who? =

2006 video game

- North American PSP cover art
- Developers: Savage Entertainment (PSP); Human Soft, Inc. (DS)
- Publisher: THQ
- Platforms: PlayStation Portable, Nintendo DS
- Release: NA: October 11, 2006; EU: November 17, 2006; AU: November 23, 2006
- Genre: Action-adventure
- Mode: Single-player

Scooby-Doo! Who's Watching Who? is a third-person action-adventure video game developed by Savage Entertainment and Human Soft, Inc. and published by THQ for the PlayStation Portable and Nintendo DS. It is based on the Scooby-Doo franchise, and was released in October and November 2006.

== Summary ==
Scooby and the gang solve mysteries against a competing group of ghost hunters on a reality TV show titled "Ghost Scene Investigators." Gameplay mostly consists of controlling Scooby-Doo in 2D platforming levels. Additional non-platforming scenarios in the game include: controlling Fred in the Mystery Machine, helping Shaggy eliminate obstacles during door-chase sequences, and assisting Velma with investigating clues. Levels within the game include: Haunted Hotel, Sugarland, Abandoned Air Field, Ocean Land, and Wolf's End Lodge.

== Reception ==
Scooby-Doo! Who's Watching Who? received "mixed or average" reviews by critics according to review aggregator Metacritic. It received an average rating of 54 out of 100 on PSP and an average rating of 56/100 on DS.

Reception

Aggregate score
Aggregator	Score
Metacritic	56/100 (DS); 54/100 (PSP)

Review scores
Publication	Score
Eurogamer	2/10 (DS)
GameZone	7.1/10 (DS); 7.4/10 (PSP)
IGN	7/10 (DS)
Nintendo Power	6.5/10 (DS)
