= Masters of the Universe: The Power of He-Man =

1983 video game

- Intellivision box art
- Developer: Mattel
- Publisher: Mattel
- Designers: Mike Sanders; Jossef Wagner
- Programmers: Intellivision; Rick Koenig; Ray Kaestner; 2600; Mike Sanders; Jossef Wagner
- Composers: Intellivision; Joshua Jeffe; 2600; Patricia Lewis Du Long
- Platforms: Intellivision, Atari 2600
- Release: Intellivision: NA: November 1983; 2600: NA: December 1983
- Genres: Horizontally scrolling shooter, action
- Mode: Single-player

The Power of He-Man on the Atari 2600

Masters of the Universe: The Power of He-Man is a horizontally scrolling shooter and action game designed for Intellivision by Mike Sanders and Jossef Wagner and published by Mattel in 1983. It is based on the multimedia franchise of the same name and marks the first video game in the series. Mattel released an Atari 2600 version under their M Network brand.
