= Masters of the Universe: The Super Adventure =

1986 video game

- Developer: Adventure Soft
- Publisher: U.S. Gold
- Platforms: BBC Micro; Commodore 64; ZX Spectrum
- Release: 1986
- Genre: Text adventure
- Mode: Single-player

Masters of the Universe: Super Adventure, also known as Masters of the Universe in Terraquake, is an interactive fiction video game developed by Adventure Soft and published by U.S. Gold in 1986. The game is part of the Masters of the Universe media franchise. The game was adapted for the BBC Micro, Commodore 64, and ZX Spectrum home computers.

Two other Masters of the Universe video games released the same year, the other two being Masters of the Universe: The Movie and Masters of the Universe: The Arcade Game.
