= He-Man: The Most Powerful Game in the Universe =

2012 video game

- App Store icon
- Developer: GlitchSoft
- Publisher: Chillingo
- Platforms: iOS, Android
- Release: iOS: WW: 25 October 2012; Android: WW: 26 August 2013
- Genre: Action-adventure
- Mode: Single-player

He-Man: The Most Powerful Game in the Universe is a 2012 handheld video game developed by Canadian studio Glitchsoft and released by Chillingo. Players control He-Man, travelling through seven regions of Eternia, with the possibility of summoning allies such as Man-At-Arms, the Sorceress and Orko in battle against Skeletor and the Evil Horde. Bosses include Skeletor himself, Beast Man, Trap Jaw, Mer-Man and Hordak.

He-Man attacks enemies, scoring a "7 hit" combo and earning gems to spend on power-ups between levels.

Later updates to the game included She-Ra as a second playable character, and King Hiss as a new boss.

In 2013, the game was released on Android under the title He-Man: The Most Powerful Game.

== Reception ==
Reception

Aggregate scores
Aggregator	Score
GameRankings	67.63%
Metacritic	69/100

Review scores
Publication	Score
IGN	6.8/10
Gamezebo	4/5
Pocket Gamer	9/10
Multiplayer.it	8.5/10
Slide to Play	3/4
TouchArcade	4.5/5

The game gained a mixed reception from critics. It currently holds a score of 69 out of 100 on Metacritic, based on eleven reviews, and a score of 67.30% on GameRankings, based on ten reviews.

IGN's Justin Davis was unimpressed, scoring the game 6.8 out of 10 and concluding that "beating up on Merman and the rest of Skeletor's thugs is fun, but He-Man isn't fast or fluid enough to truly stand as an App Store great. The game is a great nostalgia trip, and at its best it recalls greats like Gunstar Heroes. But it never quite overcomes its control issues or its by-the-numbers design."

On the other hand, Pocket Gamer's Harry Slater was extremely enthusiastic, scoring the game 9 out of 10; "GlitchSoft's new iOS cartoon adventure has all the hacking, slashing, and furry pants any child of the '80s could want, plus enough sly winks and in-jokes to satisfy the He-Man diehards. Throw in a clever control scheme and a decent challenge, and you're left with an utterly brilliant blast from the past [...] He-Man: The Most Powerful Game in the Universe is a brilliantly put-together action-platforming romp, with a knowing sense of humour and enough winks and nods to keep fans of the original cartoon grinning from ear to ear. Fun, funny, and wonderfully constructed, He-Man: The Most Powerful Game in the Universe is a fitting homage to your childhood memories."

TouchArcade's Spanner Spencer also responded positively, scoring the game 4.5 out 5, and arguing "it is rife with lavish quirks, nods and winks toward those of us who grew up taking this stuff so seriously, but can now look back at it with a wry and friendly smile. By casually lampooning itself, He-Man: The Most Powerful Game in the Universe is entirely accessible to both the young and old alike."

Gamezebo's Nadia Oxford was also impressed, scoring the game 4 out of 5, despite its shallowness; "He-Man: The Most Powerful Game in the Universe is a whole lot of brainless sword-swinging, and sometimes that's all you want out of a game. The levels are repetitive and the enemies have no AI to speak of, but slicing through the robot tide admittedly gives you a comforting sense of progression [...] He-Man: The Most Powerful Game in the Universe is shallow and straightforward, but it's fun. In fact, it's the most fun you can have with He-Man outside of re-watching your grainy VHS collection or engaging in grownup He-Man roleplay."

SlideToPlay's David Oxford scored the game 3 out of 4, concluding "He-Man: The Most Powerful Game in the Universe isn't a perfect game, but it's fun to play despite its flaws. Moreover, if you're a big fan of He-Man and the Masters of the Universe, you'll enjoy it that much more."
