= Savage Entertainment =

American video game developer

- Founded: Los Angeles, California, 1997
- Defunct: 2011
- Fate: Closed by parent company
- Headquarters: 4079B Redwood Ave. Los Angeles, California, 90066
- Key people: Tim Morten, Chacko Sonny
- Parent: Loyalize (2011)
- Website: savageentertainment.com

Savage Entertainment was an American video game developer founded in 1997 by Tim Morten and Chacko Sonny.

== History ==
Savage Entertainment was founded in 1997 by Tim Morten and Chacko Sonny. They have handled multiple ports of games, and have also developed full titles independently. Savage has also created simulators for various branches of the US government, including the Army, the Department of Homeland Security, and the Defense Advanced Research Projects Agency (DARPA). One of its titles, Star Wars: Battlefront II (PSP), placed in the top 20 in sales according to the NPD Group for 2005.

== Games developed ==
- James Bond 007: Agent Under Fire (Xbox) (2002)
- James Bond 007: Nightfire (created two driving levels) (2002)
- He-Man: Defender of Grayskull (PlayStation 2) (2005)
- Star Wars: Battlefront II (PSP) (2005)
- Scooby-Doo! Who's Watching Who? (PSP) (2006)
- Medal of Honor: Vanguard (PS2) (2007)
- Transformers: The Game (PSP) (2007)
- Wall-E (PSP) (2008)
- Rock Revolution (PlayStation 3) (2008)
- Transformers: Revenge of the Fallen (PSP) (2009)
- Marvel: Ultimate Alliance 2 (PSP) (2009)

== Cancelled games ==
- He-Man: Defender of Grayskull (GameCube and Xbox ports)
- Destroy All Humans! Big Willy Unleashed (PS2 and PSP ports)
- Saints Row: Undercover (PSP)
