= Masters of the Universe: The Arcade Game =

1987 video game

- Developer: Adventure Soft
- Publisher: U.S. Gold
- Platforms: Amstrad CPC, BBC Micro, Commodore 64, ZX Spectrum
- Release: 1987
- Genre: Platform
- Modes: Single-player, Multiplayer

Masters of the Universe: The Arcade Game is a platform game developed by Adventure Soft for the Amstrad CPC, BBC Micro, Commodore 64, and ZX Spectrum and published by U.S. Gold in 1987. The game is part of the Masters of the Universe media franchise. The Commodore 64 version is titled He-Man and the Masters of the Universe: The Ilearth Stone.

In the same year, U.S. Gold also published Masters of the Universe: The Super Adventure.
