= He-Man: Power of Grayskull =

2002 video game

- Developer(s): Taniko
- Publisher(s): TDK Mediactive
- Composer(s): Allister Brimble
- Platform(s): Game Boy Advance
- Release: NA: October 29, 2002
- Genre(s): Action
- Mode(s): Single-player

He-Man: Power of Grayskull is an isometric action game for the Game Boy Advance, published by TDK Mediactive in 2002.

== Reception ==
Reception

Aggregate score
Aggregator	Score
Metacritic	50/100 (8 reviews)

The game was received generally mixed reviews from video games critics.
