= John Powell (film composer) =

English film music composer and music conductor

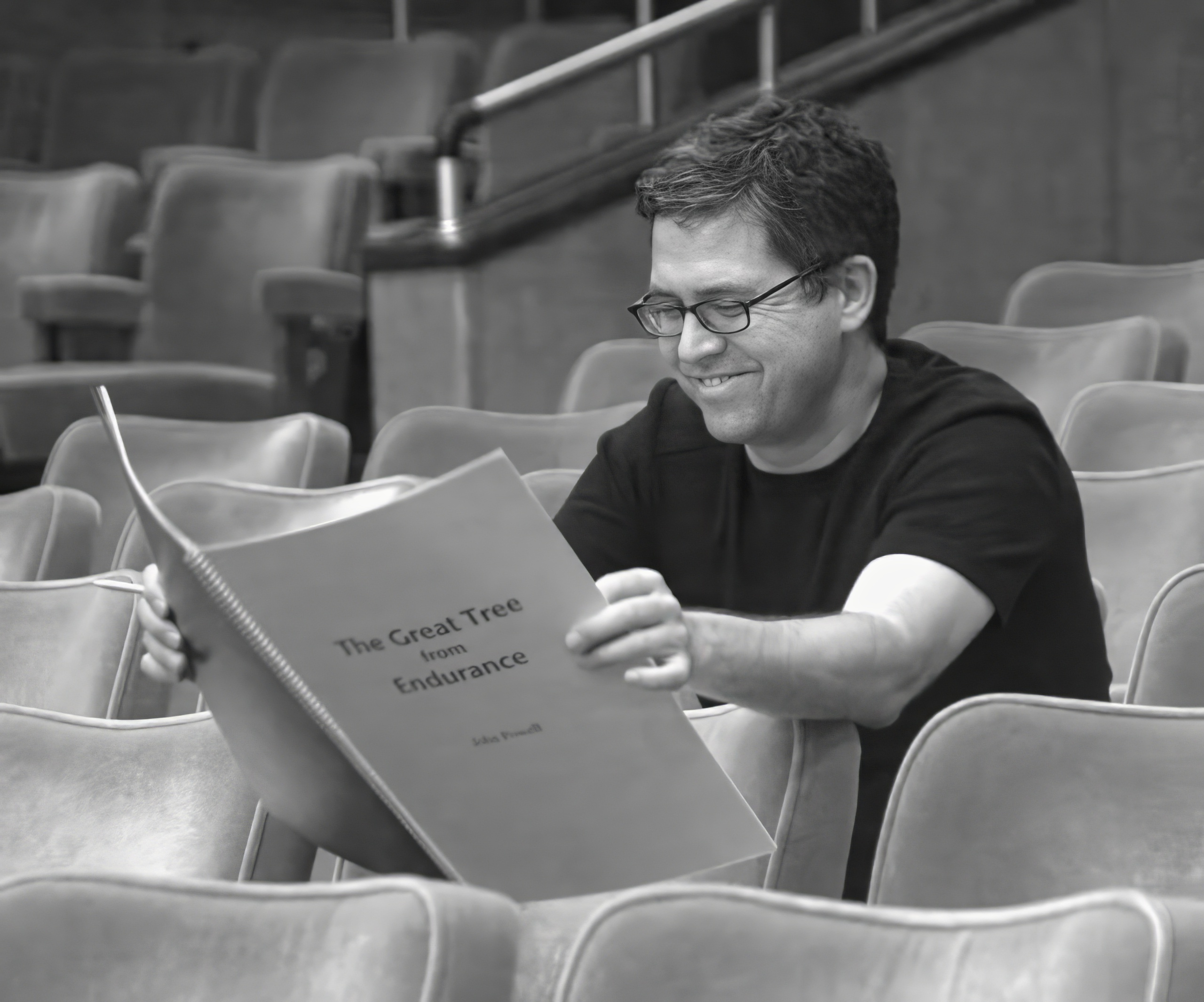
- John Powell at his concert rehearsal, March 2008

Background information
- Born: 18 September 1963 (age 63); London, England
- Origin: East Sussex, England
- Genre: Film score
- Occupations: Music composer; music conductor
- Years active: 1989–present
- Label: 5 Cat Studios
- Website: johnpowellmusic.com

John Powell (born 18 September 1963) is an English composer and conductor of film scores. Based in Los Angeles since 1997, he has composed music for over 70 feature films including Face/Off, I Am Sam, the Bourne franchise, The Italian Job, Mr. & Mrs. Smith, X-Men: The Last Stand, Hancock, Pan, Solo: A Star Wars Story, Don't Worry Darling, Wicked and its sequel Wicked: For Good, ten DreamWorks Animation films, eight Blue Sky Studios films, and three Illumination films.

Powell's work on Happy Feet, Ferdinand, Solo: A Star Wars Story, Wicked, and the live-action remake of How to Train Your Dragon earned him six Grammy Award nominations. Additionally, he earned two Academy Award for Best Original Score nominations for the original How to Train Your Dragon and Wicked.

Powell was a member of Hans Zimmer's music studio, Remote Control Productions and has collaborated frequently with other composers from the studio including Harry Gregson-Williams on Antz, Chicken Run, and Shrek in addition to Zimmer himself on Chill Factor, The Road to El Dorado, and the first two Kung Fu Panda movies. He also collaborated with film directors Carlos Saldanha, Dean DeBlois, Chris Sanders, Jon M. Chu, George Miller, John Woo, Ron Underwood, Doug Liman, Charles Stone III and Paul Greengrass.

== Early life and education ==
Powell was born in London. As a child, he played the violin and viola. He studied the violin at Trinity College of Music in central London (now Trinity Laban Conservatoire of Music and Dance in Greenwich). There, he met John Ashton Thomas, who orchestrated many of Powell's scores. Powell played for Faboulistics, an amateur rock and roll band.

After finishing college, he composed music for commercials, which led to a job as an assistant to the composer Patrick Doyle on several film productions including Much Ado About Nothing. In 1995, Powell along with Gavin Greenaway founded Thinking Music, an independent commercial music house which has produced scores for more than 100 British and French commercials and independent films.

== Career ==
Powell's first score was for Season 4 of the TV series Stay Lucky. He moved to Los Angeles in 1997 and scored his first major film, Face/Off. It was followed by Antz in 1998, the first film produced by DreamWorks Animation. He and fellow British composer Harry Gregson-Williams scored it, marking the duo's first score for an animated film. In 2000, Powell collaborated with Zimmer on the score for The Road to El Dorado. Later in 2000, he teamed with Gregson-Williams again to compose the score to Chicken Run and then again on Shrek in 2001. Gregson-Williams composed all of the subsequent Shrek films and the sequel to Chicken Run. In 2001 Powell scored Evolution, I Am Sam, Just Visiting and Rat Race.

In 2002 Powell was hired to score The Bourne Identity for director Liman after Carter Burwell left the project. Powell returned to score the series' other two films, The Bourne Supremacy and The Bourne Ultimatum, under Greengrass, a British director. Powell collaborated with Liman again to score Mr. & Mrs. Smith (2005). In 2005 he also scored Robots for Blue Sky Studios and scored many of the studio's subsequent films until 2017's Ferdinand.

In 2006, he scored Greengrass' United 93. He composed music for his second Blue Sky film Ice Age: The Meltdown, replacing David Newman, who scored the first Ice Age film; as well as X-Men: The Last Stand and Happy Feet, for which he won a Film & TV Music Award for Best Score for an Animated Feature Film. In 2007, he scored The Bourne Ultimatum. In 2008 he and Zimmer worked together again, scoring Kung Fu Panda for DreamWorks Animation and Powell wrote music for Jumper, Dr. Seuss' Horton Hears a Who!, Hancock, and Bolt. In 2009 he scored the third film in the Ice Age series; Dawn of the Dinosaurs.

In 2010, Powell composed the score to How to Train Your Dragon, earning a nomination for the Academy Award for Best Original Score. It was his sixth DreamWorks Animation film, although the first time he composed an entire score himself. In 2010, he scored Greengrass' Green Zone and Knight and Day. In 2013, Powell took a sabbatical year from film scoring. In April 2014, after completing his scores to sequels Rio 2 and How to Train Your Dragon 2, he announced he would take another break to compose concert music, including a 45-minute oratorio to commemorate the 100-year anniversary of World War I. The piece, "A Prussian Requiem", with a libretto by Michael Petry, premiered on March 6, 2016 at The Royal Festival Hall in London with José Serebrier conducting the Philharmonia Orchestra.

Powell composed the score for Solo: A Star Wars Story (2018), collaborating with John Williams, who wrote Han Solo's theme. In 2019, Powell scored How to Train Your Dragon: The Hidden World, the final film in the How to Train Your Dragon series. In November 2023, it was announced that Powell would compose and produce the musical score for the 2024 Netflix and Locksmith Animation film That Christmas. In January 2024, it was announced that Powell would return to compose and produce the musical score for the 2025 live-action remake of How to Train Your Dragon. In August 2024, it was confirmed that Powell would compose and conduct the incidental score for the two-part film adaptation of Wicked, in collaboration with the musical's composer Stephen Schwartz.

== Filmography ==
=== Film ===
==== 1990s ====
Year	Title	Director(s)	Note(s)
1997	Face/Off	John Woo	Also soundtrack album producer Additional music composed by Gavin Greenaway; Originally composed by Mark Isham; John Powell's first musical score for a feature film
1998	With Friends Like These...	Philip Frank Messina	Also music conductor
1998	Endurance	Leslie Woodhead	Also music producer and soundtrack album producer Additional music composed by Geoff Zanelli
1998	Antz	Eric Darnell and Tim Johnson	Also soundtrack album co-producer Co-composed with Harry Gregson-Williams; Additional music composed by Greenaway, Zanelli and Steve Jablonsky; Powell's first musical score for an animated feature film
1999	Forces of Nature	Bronwen Hughes	Also soundtrack album producer Additional music composed by Greenaway
1999	Chill Factor	Hugh Johnson	Also a soundtrack album co-producer Co-composer with Hans Zimmer; Additional music composed by Klaus Badelt, James S. Levine, James McKee Smith, Jeff Rona, and Zanelli

==== 2000s ====
Year	Title	Director(s)	Note(s)
2000	The Road to El Dorado	Eric "Bibo" Bergeron, Don Paul and Jeffrey Katzenberg	Also soundtrack album co-producer Co-composer with Zimmer; Additional music composed by Badelt, Greenaway, James McKee Smith, and Zanelli
2000	Chicken Run	Peter Lord and Nick Park	Also soundtrack album producer Co-composed with Gregson-Williams; Additional music composed by Greenaway, Don L. Harper, Alastair King, James McKee Smith, Zanelli, and Jablonsky
2001	Just Visiting	Jean-Marie Poiré	Also soundtrack album producer Additional music composed by Nick Glennie-Smith, James McKee Smith, and Zanelli
2001	Shrek	Andrew Adamson and Vicky Jenson	Also soundtrack album co-producer Co-composed with Gregson-Williams; Additional music composed by King, James McKee Smith, and Toby Chu
2001	Evolution	Ivan Reitman	Also soundtrack album producer Trailer music composed by Daniel Nielsen; Additional music composed by Greenaway and James McKee Smith
2001	Rat Race	Jerry Zucker	Also soundtrack album producer Originally composed by Elmer Bernstein; Additional music composed by James McKee Smith and John Ashton Thomas
2001	I Am Sam	Jessie Nelson	Also soundtrack album producer
2002	D-Tox	Jim Gillespie	Also soundtrack album producer Additional music composed by Glennie-Smith, James McKee Smith, William Ross, and Geoff Zanelli
2002	The Bourne Identity	Doug Liman	Also soundtrack album producer Originally composed by Carter Burwell; Additional music composed by James McKee Smith and Joel Richard
2002	Drumline	Charles Stone III	Also soundtrack album co-producer
2002	The Adventures of Pluto Nash	Ron Underwood	Also soundtrack album producer Additional music composed by James McKee Smith, Joel J. Richard and John Ashton Thomas
2002	Two Weeks Notice	Marc Lawrence	Also soundtrack album producer
2003	Agent Cody Banks	Harald Zwart	Also soundtrack album producer Additional music composed by James McKee Smith and John Ashton Thomas
2003	The Italian Job	F. Gary Gray	Also guitarist and soundtrack album producer Additional music composed by T.J. Lindgren, James McKee Smith, Rupert Parkes, and John Ashton Thomas
2003	Gigli	Martin Brest	Also soundtrack album producer Originally composed by Carter Burwell; Trailer music composed by Daniel Nielsen
2003	Paycheck	John Woo	Also soundtrack album producer Additional music composed by T.J. Lindgren, James McKee Smith and John Ashton Thomas
2004	The Bourne Supremacy	Paul Greengrass	Also soundtrack album producer Trailer music composed by Daniel Nielsen
2004	Mr. 3000	Charles Stone III	Also soundtrack album producer Originally co-composed with Vernon Reid
2004	Alfie	Charles Shyer	Also soundtrack album producer Co-composer with Mick Jagger and David A. Stewart
2005	Be Cool	F. Gary Gray	Also instrumental piece performer for "Cool Chill" as well as guitarist and score producer Additional music composed by Dylan Berry
2005	Robots	Chris Wedge	Also soundtrack album producer Trailer music composed by Daniel Nielsen
2005	Mr. & Mrs. Smith	Doug Liman	Also music conductor and soundtrack album producer Trailer music composed by Nielsen
2006	Ice Age: The Meltdown	Carlos Saldanha	Also soundtrack album co-producer Originally composed by David Newman; Co-composed with Will Edwards; Trailer music composed by Nielsen; Additional music composed by James McKee Smith and John Ashton Thomas
2006	United 93	Paul Greengrass	Also soundtrack album producer
2006	X-Men: The Last Stand	Brett Ratner	Also a soundtrack album producer Additional music composed by James McKee Smith and John Ashton Thomas
2006	Happy Feet	George Miller	Also a song arranger, a song producer and a soundtrack album producer Nominated for a Grammy Award for Best Score Soundtrack Album for Motion Picture, Television or Other Media; Additional music composed by John Ashton Thomas
2007	The Bourne Ultimatum	Paul Greengrass	Also soundtrack album producer Additional music composed by James McKee Smith, Joel J. Richard, John Ashton Thomas, and Islam Sabry
2007	P.S. I Love You	Richard LaGravenese	Also guitarist and soundtrack album producer Additional music composed by John Ashton Thomas and Scott Liggett
2008	Jumper	Doug Liman	Also soundtrack album producer Additional music composed by James McKee Smith and John Ashton Thomas
2008	Dr. Seuss' Horton Hears a Who!	Jimmy Hayward and Steve Martino	Also soundtrack album producer Additional music by James McKee Smith, John Ashton Thomas, and Paul Mounsey
2008	Stop-Loss	Kimberly Peirce	Also music conductor, solo guitarist, and soundtrack album producer
2008	Kung Fu Panda	John Stevenson and Mark Osborne	Also soundtrack album co-producer Co-composer with Zimmer; Additional music composed by James McKee Smith and Henry Jackman
2008	Hancock	Peter Berg	Also soundtrack album producer Trailer music composed by Ernst Meinrath; Additional music composed by Jackman, James McKee Smith, and John Ashton Thomas
2008	Bolt	Chris Williams and Byron Howard	Also soundtrack album producer Walt Disney Animation Studios theme music composed by Wilfred Jackson; Additional music composed by James McKee Smith, Mounsey, and John Ashton Thomas
2009	Ice Age: Dawn of the Dinosaurs	Carlos Saldanha	Also soundtrack album producer Additional music composed by James McKee Smith and Mounsey

==== 2010s ====
Year	Title	Director(s)	Note(s)
2010	Green Zone	Paul Greengrass	Also soundtrack album producer
2010	How to Train Your Dragon	Chris Sanders and Dean DeBlois	Also soundtrack album producer Nominated for an Academy Award for Best Original Score; Additional music composed by Mounsey
2010	Fair Game	Doug Liman	Also soundtrack album producer Additional music composed by Mounsey
2010	Knight and Day	James Mangold	Also soundtrack album producer Additional music composed by Beth Caucci, Mounsey, and James McKee Smith
2011	Mars Needs Moms	Simon Wells	Also soundtrack album producer Additional music composed by Mounsey, Beth Caucci, Victor Chaga, and Michael Z. Gordon
2011	Rio	Carlos Saldanha	Also whistler and soundtrack album co-producer Additional music composed by Dominic Lewis and Mounsey
2011	Kung Fu Panda 2	Jennifer Yuh Nelson	Also soundtrack album co-producer Co-composer with Zimmer; Additional music composed by Mounsey, James Carlson, Lorne Balfe, and Dominic Lewis
2011	Happy Feet Two	George Miller	Also soundtrack album producer Additional music composed by Mounsey and Hélène Muddiman
2012	Dr. Seuss' The Lorax	Chris Renaud	Also songwriter, guitarist, and soundtrack album producer Additional music composed by Mounsey, Caucci, and Chaga
2012	Ice Age: Continental Drift	Steve Martino and Mike Thurmeier	Also soundtrack album producer Additional music composed by Mounsey, Caucci, Chaga, and Muddiman
2014	Rio 2	Carlos Saldanha	Also soundtrack album co-producer Additional music composed by Anthony B. Willis and Mounsey
2014	How to Train Your Dragon 2	Dean DeBlois	Also soundtrack album producer Additional music composed by Anthony Willis and Mounsey
2015	Pan	Joe Wright	Also soundtrack album producer Additional music composed by Anthony Willis, Batu Sener and Mounsey
2016	Jason Bourne	Paul Greengrass	Also soundtrack album producer Co-composed with David Buckley; Additional music composed by Sener
2017	Ferdinand	Carlos Saldanha	Also music conductor, score producer, and soundtrack album producer Nominated for a Grammy Award for Best Arrangement, Instrumental or A Cappella; Additional music composed by Sener, Anthony Willis, and Paul Mounsey
2018	Solo: A Star Wars Story	Ron Howard	Also a soundtrack album producer and score producer. Nominated for a Grammy Award for Best Instrumental Composition"; Han Solo theme music and original Star Wars music composed by John Williams; Additional music composed by Sener, Anthony Willis, Sébastien Pan, Paul Mounsey; Trailer music composed by Salvador Casais, Nicolas Felix, Gerrit Kinkel, Alex Klingle, Michael Werner Maas, and Denis Surov
2019	How to Train Your Dragon: The Hidden World	Dean DeBlois	Also soundtrack album producer Trailer music composed by Benjamin Squires; Additional music composed by Sener, Anthony Willis, and Mounsey

==== 2020s ====
Year	Title	Director(s)	Note(s)
2020	The Call of the Wild	Chris Sanders	Also music conductor, score producer and soundtrack album producer Additional music composed by Sener, Kamille Rudisill, Kelly Adams, and Mounsey
2021	Locked Down	Doug Liman	Also score producer and score performer Additional music composed by Sener
2022	Don't Worry Darling	Olivia Wilde	Also music conductor and soundtrack album producer Additional music composed by Sener
2023	Still: A Michael J. Fox Movie	Davis Guggenheim	Also a soundtrack album producer Additional music composed by Sener; Powell's first musical score for a documentary feature film Primetime Emmy Award for Outstanding Music Composition for a Documentary Series or Special (Original Dramatic Score)
2023	Migration	Benjamin Renner	Also soundtrack album producer Additional music composed by Sener and Peter Michael Davison
2024	Thelma the Unicorn	Jared Hess and Lynn Wang	Also choir conductor and soundtrack album producer Additional music composed by Sener
2024	Wicked	Jon M. Chu	Also choir conductor and soundtrack album producer Nominated for an Academy Award for Best Original Score and a Grammy Award for Best Score Soundtrack for Visual Media; Co-composer with Stephen Schwartz; Additional music composed by Sener and Markus Siegel
2024	That Christmas	Simon Otto	Also musical score producer and soundtrack album producer Additional music composed by Sener, Anthony Willis, Ed Sheeran, Snow Patrol member Johnny McDaid, LeTroy Davis II and Siegel; Nominated for a Hollywood Music in Media Award for Best Original Score in an Animated Film, an Annie Award for Outstanding Achievement for Music in a Feature Production, an International Film Music Critics Association Award for Best Original Score for an Animated Film and a Children's and Family Emmy Award for Outstanding Music Direction and Composition for an Animated Program
2025	How to Train Your Dragon	Dean DeBlois	Also choir conductor and soundtrack album producer Live-action remake of the 2010 animated film of the same name Nominated for a Grammy Award for Best Score Soundtrack for Visual Media; Additional music composed by Sener and Siegel
2025	Wicked: For Good	Jon M. Chu	Also a choir conductor and a soundtrack album producer Co-composed with Stephen Schwartz; Additional music composed by Sener, Markus Siegel and Mounsey
2026	Minions & Monsters	Pierre Coffin	Originally composed by Heitor Pereira
2027	How to Train Your Dragon 2	Dean DeBlois	Live-action remake of the 2014 animated film of the same name
2027	Shrek 5	Walt Dohrn and Conrad Vernon	

=== Television ===
Year	Title	Creator(s)	Note(s)
1989–1993	Stay Lucky	Geoff McQueen	Co-composed with Ray Russell; Title song composed by Danny Chang and Mike Price; Powell's first musical score for a television series
1996–1997	High Incident	Steven Spielberg, Michael Pavone, Eric Bogosian and Dave Alan Johnson	Co-composer with Jeff Rona and Christopher Tyng; Theme music composed by Zimmer; Additional music composed by Chris Horvath
2003	Stealing Sinatra	Howard Korder	Television film Additional music composed by James McKee Smith; John Powell's first musical score for a television film
2022	Ice Age: Scrat Tales	Chris Wedge	Television miniseries Theme; Also accordionist and soundtrack album co-producer Score composed by Sener

== Albums ==
=== Studio albums ===
Year	Title	Category	Notes	Catalogue Number
2018	Hubris: Choral Works by John Powell	Classical	First release on Powell's own label, 5 Cats Studios Powell's first original project Performed with the Philharmonia Orchestra	FCS001
2020	Piano Solos from "How to Train Your Dragon: The Hidden World"	Solo Piano	Music by Powell Piano solos performed by Sener	FCS005
2020	Piano Solos from "The Call of the Wild"	Solo Piano	Music by Powell Piano solos performed by Sener	FCS007
2020	Film Suites, Vol. 1	Classical	Performed with Jose Serebrier, Philharmonia Orchestra, and The Philharmonia Voices.	FCS010

=== Archival soundtrack albums ===
Year	Title	Notes	Catalogue Number
2020	Forces of Nature (Music from the Motion Picture)	Released on Audio CD Limited to 1000 copies Co-composed with Oliver J. Lieber The first awaiting official score album since the 1999 film debut Includes 2 bonus tracks/demos	
2020	How to Train Your Dragon (The Deluxe Edition)	Deluxe Edition of the 2010 film score Includes alternate versions and demos	
2020	Solo: A Star Wars Story (Deluxe Edition)	Deluxe Edition of the 2018 film score Includes over two hours of original/unedited music as written for the film, and an end credits suite Han Solo Theme & Original Star Wars Music by John Williams Additional music by Sener, Anthony Willis & Paul Mounsey	
2021	Paycheck: The Deluxe Edition (Music From The Motion Picture)	Deluxe Edition of the 2003 film score This Deluxe Edition greatly expands the playing time to over 95 minutes.	
2022	How to Train Your Dragon 2 (The Deluxe Edition)	Deluxe Edition of the 2014 film score Includes alternate versions and demos	
2022	The Bourne Identity (Tumescent Edition)	Expanded score with alternate versions of cues	888072412774
2024	How to Train Your Dragon: The Hidden World (The Deluxe Edition)	Deluxe Edition of the 2019 film score Includes alternate versions and demos Additional music by Sener, Anthony Willis & Mounsey	

== See also ==
- Music of Star Wars
