= List of 2012 box office number-one films in Venezuela =

This is a list of films which have placed number one at the weekend box office in Venezuela during 2012.

== Number-one films ==
| † | This implies the highest-grossing movie of the year. |

| # | Date | Film | Gross | Notes |
|---|---|---|---|---|
| 1 | January 8, 2012 | Puss in Boots | $508,067 | |
| 2 | January 15, 2012 | Jack and Jill | $559,537 | |
| 3 | January 22, 2012 | Jack and Jill | $487,956 | |
| 4 | January 29, 2012 | Jack and Jill | $421,975 | |
| 5 | February 5, 2012 | Alvin and the Chipmunks: Chipwrecked | $429,488 | |
| 6 | February 12, 2012 | Mission: Impossible – Ghost Protocol | $400,329 | |
| 7 | February 19, 2012 | Mission: Impossible – Ghost Protocol | $353,657 | |
| 8 | February 26, 2012 | Underworld: Awakening | $564,947 | |
| 9 | March 4, 2012 | Underworld: Awakening | $466,658 | |
| 10 | March 11, 2012 | John Carter | $564,797 | |
| 11 | March 18, 2012 | John Carter | $519,075 | |
| 12 | March 25, 2012 | John Carter | $326,075 | |
| 13 | April 1, 2012 | Wrath of the Titans | $1,016,412 | |
| 14 | April 8, 2012 | Wrath of the Titans | $1,083,909 | |
| 15 | April 15, 2012 | Wrath of the Titans | $708,944 | |
| 16 | April 22, 2012 | The Lorax | $509,058 | |
| 17 | April 29, 2012 | The Avengers | $1,585,295 | |
| 18 | May 6, 2012 | The Avengers | $1,458,620 | |
| 19 | May 13, 2012 | The Avengers | $1,037,153 | |
| 20 | May 20, 2012 | The Avengers | $1,060,276 | |
| 21 | May 27, 2012 | Men in Black 3 | $1,220,259 | |
| 22 | June 3, 2012 | Men in Black 3 | $1,027,778 | |
| 23 | June 10, 2012 | Madagascar 3: Europe's Most Wanted | $1,298,255 | |
| 24 | June 17, 2012 | Madagascar 3: Europe's Most Wanted | $1,379,283 | |
| 25 | June 24, 2012 | Madagascar 3: Europe's Most Wanted | $1,175,481 | |
| 26 | July 1, 2012 | Madagascar 3: Europe's Most Wanted | $1,146,333 | |
| 27 | July 8, 2012 | The Amazing Spider-Man | $1,332,196 | |
| 28 | July 15, 2012 | The Amazing Spider-Man | $1,036,574 | |
| 29 | July 22, 2012 | Ice Age: Continental Drift † | $2,056,823 | Ice Age: Continental Drift had the highest weekend debut of 2012. |
| 30 | July 29, 2012 | Ice Age: Continental Drift † | $1,566,568 | |
| 31 | August 5, 2012 | Ice Age: Continental Drift † | $1,319,390 | |
| 32 | August 12, 2012 | Brave | $1,204,704 | |
| 33 | August 19, 2012 | Brave | $1,162,196 | |
| 34 | August 26, 2012 | Brave | $882,282 | |
| 35 | September 2, 2012 | Brave | $668,178 | |
| 36 | September 9, 2012 | Prometheus | $525,152 | |
| 37 | September 16, 2012 | Resident Evil: Retribution | $1,027,114 | |
| 38 | September 23, 2012 | Resident Evil: Retribution | $701,790 | |
| 39 | September 30, 2012 | Resident Evil: Retribution | $474,645 | |
| 40 | October 7, 2012 | Resident Evil: Retribution | $219,455 | |
| 41 | October 14, 2012 | Abraham Lincoln: Vampire Hunter | $497,457 | |
| 42 | October 21, 2012 | The Snitch Cartel | $482,488 | |
| 43 | October 28, 2012 | The Snitch Cartel | $487,457 | |
| 44 | November 4, 2012 | ParaNorman | $660,583 | |
| 45 | November 11, 2012 | ParaNorman | $526,420 | |
| 46 | November 18, 2012 | The Twilight Saga: Breaking Dawn – Part 2 | $2,043,910 | |
| 47 | November 25, 2012 | The Twilight Saga: Breaking Dawn – Part 2 | $1,419,153 | |
| 48 | December 2, 2012 | The Twilight Saga: Breaking Dawn – Part 2 | $821,204 | |
| 49 | December 9, 2012 | Hotel Transylvania | $667,108 | |
| 50 | December 16, 2012 | Hotel Transylvania | $547,382 | |
| 51 | December 23, 2012 | The Hobbit: An Unexpected Journey | $625,458 | |
| 52 | December 30, 2012 | Wreck-It Ralph | $1,066,015 | |

== Highest-grossing films ==
Highest-grossing films of 2012 in Venezuela
| Rank | Title | Studio | Domestic Gross |
|---|---|---|---|
| 1. | Ice Age: Continental Drift | 20th Century Fox / Blue Sky Studios | $14,680,514 |
| 2. | The Avengers | Walt Disney Pictures / Marvel Studios | $13,216,039 |
| 3. | Madagascar 3: Europe's Most Wanted | Paramount Pictures / DreamWorks Animation | $12,554,510 |
| 4. | Wreck-It Ralph | Walt Disney Pictures | $11,182,824 |
| 5. | Brave | Walt Disney Pictures / Pixar Animation Studios | $10,180,176 |
| 6. | The Twilight Saga: Breaking Dawn – Part 2 | Summit Entertainment | $9,353,315 |
| 7. | The Amazing Spider-Man | Columbia Pictures | $7,386,300 |
| 8. | The Dark Knight Rises | Warner Bros. / DC Entertainment | $7,143,582 |
| 9. | Wrath of the Titans | Warner Bros. | $6,820,191 |
| 10. | Men in Black 3 | Columbia Pictures | $5,465,350 |
