= Mathematical Applications Group =

American software and visual effects company

Mathematical Applications Group, Inc.
- Industry: Computer animation
- Founded: 1966; 60 years ago
- Founder: Dr. Philip Mittelman
- Defunct: 1985; 41 years ago
- Fate: Sold to Vidmax and many of the workers when to found Blue Sky Studios
- Successor: Blue Sky Studios

Mathematical Applications Group, Inc. (a.k.a. MAGI or MAGI/SynthaVision or MAGI Animation Studios) was an early computer technology company founded in 1966 by Dr. Philip Mittelman and located in Elmsford, New York, where it was evaluating nuclear radiation exposure. By modeling structures using combinatorial geometry mathematics and applying Monte Carlo radiation ray tracing techniques, the mathematicians could estimate exposures at various distances and relative locations in and around fictional structures. In 1972, the graphics group called MAGI/SynthaVision was formed at MAGI by Robert Goldstein.

It was one of four companies hired to create the 3-D computer animation for the 1982 film Tron. MAGI was responsible for most of the CGI animation in the first half of Tron, while Triple-I worked mainly on the second half of the film. MAGi modeled and animated the light cycles, recognizers and tanks.

== Product and legacy ==
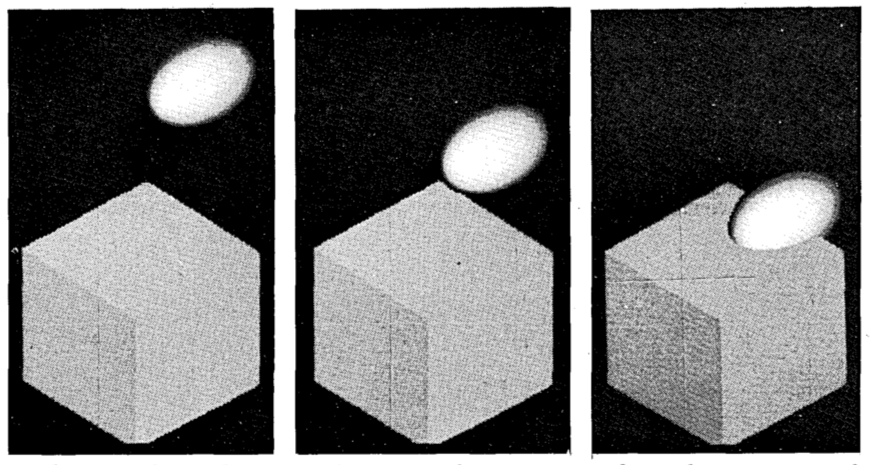
A sequence of raytraced 3-D renders produced by MAGI, published in the November 22, 1967 issue of Computerworld, and reprinted in the February 1968 issue of Datamation.

MAGI developed a software program called SynthaVision to create CGI images and films. SynthaVision was one of the first systems to implement a ray tracing algorithmic approach to hidden surface removal in rendering images. The software was a constructive solid geometry (CSG) system, in that the geometry was solid primitives with combinatorial operators (such as Boolean operators).

SynthaVision's modeling method does not use polygons or wireframe meshes that most CGI companies use today. The combination of the solid modeling and ray tracing (later to become plane firing) made it a very robust system that could generate high-quality images.

MAGi created the world's first CGI advertisement for IBM, featuring 3-D letters that flew out of an office machine.

== History ==
In 1972, MAGI/SynthaVision was started by Robert Goldstein, with Bo Gehring and Larry Elin covering the design and film/television interests, respectively.

Two of the first television commercial applications were storyboarded by Texas artist, Gordon Blocker in 1973-4 for the Texas Commerce Bank "Flag Card" commercial and a news open for KHOU-TV (CBS) in Houston, Texas.

From 1973 until 1981, Bo Gehring, Larry Elin, Jack Heyl, Nancy Hunter Campi and Chris Wedge were hired at various times and used the SynthaVision animation system to create television graphics and educational and industrial films for clients. The demo reels spanning these years can be viewed here: https://vimeo.com/218835904

=== Tron ===
In 1981, MAGI was hired by Disney to create half of the majority of the 20 minutes of CGI needed for the film Tron. Twenty minutes of CGI animation, in the early 1980s, was extremely gutsy, and so MAGi was a portion of the CGI animation, while other companies were hired to do the other animation shots. Since SynthaVision was easy to animate and could create fluid motion and movement, MAGI was assigned with most of Tron's action sequences. These classic scenes include the light cycle sequence and Clu's tank and recognizer pursuit scene. Despite the high-quality images that SynthaVision was able to create, the CSG solid modeling could not create anything with complex shapes and multiple curves, so simpler objects like the light cycles and tanks were assigned to MAGI. MAGI was given $1.2 million to finance the animation needed for Tron. MAGI needed more R&D and many other engineers who were working in government contracts at MAGI were assigned into MAGI's "SynthaVision" division.

MAGI sped up the process of supplying its work to Walt Disney Studios in Burbank, California by a transcontinental computer hook-up. Before each scene was finalized in MAGI's lab in Elmsford, New York, it was previewed on a computer monitor at Disney. Corrections could then be made in the scene immediately. Previously, the only way of previewing the scene was to film it, ship it to Burbank, get corrections made, ship it back to Elmsford, and continue this "ping-ponging" until the scene was correct. The computer link is cut between two-and-a-half to five days from the creation of each scene.

During the production of Tron, animators and computer image choreographers Bill Kroyer and Jerry Rees invited John Lasseter (who would later co-found Pixar) to see some of the light cycle animation. Lasseter said in "The Making of Tron" featurette that the light cycle animation was the first CGI animation he had ever seen.

=== After Tron ===
MAGI’s work on Tron inspired more work from advertising agencies. In 1982, MAGI won the very first Clio award for computer animation for a commercial it created called “Worm War 1” for Atari video games. Many more projects for major ad agencies and clients followed.

In 1983, Disney commissioned MAGI to create a test film featuring characters from the children's book Where the Wild Things Are. The Wild Things test used CGI animation for the backgrounds and traditional 2-D animation for the characters "Max" and his dog. Animators John Lasseter and Glen Keane of Disney directed the test for Disney. At MAGi, Larry Elin directed Chris Wedge and Jan Carle and produced a 3-D background pencil test based on Disney's story animatics. Lasseter and Keane at Disney then hand-animated over the CGI background wireframes. A tight bi-coastal production loop was designed. MAGI programmer Josh Pines developed film scanning software to digitize and clean up the final hand-drawn character film footage from Disney. The scanning software was adapted to produce cleaner digitized images. Concurrently, an ink and paint system was written by Christine Chang, Jodi Slater, and Ken Perlin for production. This early paint system filled in color within character line borders, applied shadow, and highlighted and applied a blur to the color areas to produce an airbrush 2.5D effect. The final painted characters and CGI-rendered backgrounds were digitally composited, color-corrected, and light-scanned back onto film with a Celco camera for lab processing and delivery back to Disney.

In 1984, MAGI opened an office in Los Angeles, California, headed by Richard Taylor, who worked as visual effects supervisor on Tron. Taylor, Wedge, and Carlee directed a test for a Disney film Something Wicked This Way Comes, but the software and computing hardware proved insufficient for the proposed animation and visual effects. The Los Angeles office was closed shortly after its establishment.

Also in 1984, Michael Ferraro and Tom Bisogno began production on a short film, “First Flight”, for the SIGGRAPH '84 Electronic Theater. To achieve organic textures such as clouds, water, and bark, they made use of a programming language called KPL that Ken Perlin had been developing, which was designed to run a full computer program at every pixel of an image. KPL was the first example of a general purpose procedural shader language, a concept which was subsequently adopted by Pixar for its Pixar RenderMan platform, and which eventually led to the development of the modern graphics processing unit (GPU). Perlin noise was also created by Ken Perlin as a built-in function within KPL.

Much of the MAGI/SynthaVision software was Fortran-based, with a Ratfor interface for the artists. In 1985, Josh Pines argued to use the Unix programming environment for any future software and production programming design.

Soon after, the SynthaVision software was sold to Lockheed's (CADAM) division as the foundation of ISD (Interactive Solids Design), and MAGi was formally sold to a Canadian firm, Vidmax (which later went defunct); many of the employees left for other CGI companies and universities. Some of the employees that consist of Chris Wedge, Michael Ferraro, Carl Ludwig, Eugene Trubetskoy, David Brown, and Allison Brown, would go on to establish their own studio called Blue Sky studios in 1987.

Phillip Mittelman, the founder of MAGi, died in December 1999.

=== MAGI staff (1975–1985) ===
- Dr. Phil Mittelman
- Bo Gehring
- Robert Goldstein
- Harold S. Schechter
- Henry Lichtenstein
- Larry Elin
- Jack Heyl
- Nancy Hunter Campi
- Liza Moon
- Marty Cohen
- Herb Steinberg
- Dr. Eugene Troubetzkoy
- Ken Perlin
- Evan Laski
- Chris Wedge
- Tom Bisogno
- Carl Ludwig
- Jan Carlee
- Gene Miller
- Josh Pines
- Christine Chang
- Jodi Slater
- Elyse Vaintrub
- Kevin Egan
- Paul Harris
- Richard Taylor
- Tom Miller
- David Brown
- Mike Ferraro
- Alison Brown
- John Beach
- Glenn Alsup
- J.A. Lopez
- Dr. Naoko Akagi
- Dr. Henry Lichtenstein
- Mendel Beer
