= Carlos Saldanha =

Brazilian animator (born 1965)

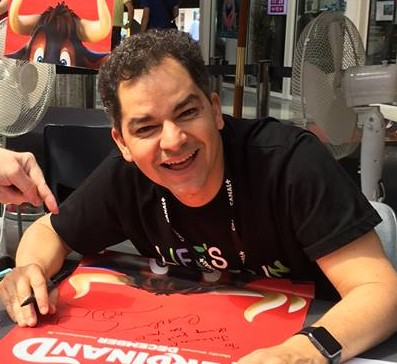
- Saldanha in 2017
- Born: 24 January 1965 (age 61); Rio de Janeiro, Brazil
- Education: School of Visual Arts
- Occupations: Filmmaker; animator; voice actor
- Years active: 1983–present
- Employers: Blue Sky Studios (1993–2021); Sony Pictures Entertainment (2021–2024); 20th Century Animation (2024–present)
- Notable work: Ice Age: The Meltdown; Ice Age: Dawn of the Dinosaurs; Rio; Rio 2; Ferdinand; Harold and the Purple Crayon
- Spouse: Isabella Scarpa
- Children: 4

Carlos Saldanha (Portuguese pronunciation: [ˈkaʁluz sawˈdɐɲɐ]; born 24 January 1965) is a Brazilian animator, filmmaker, and voice actor of animated films who collaborated with Blue Sky Studios until its closure in 2021. He was the director of Ice Age: The Meltdown (2006), Ice Age: Dawn of the Dinosaurs (2009), Rio (2011), Rio 2 (2014), Ferdinand (2017), and Harold and the Purple Crayon (2024), and the co-director of Ice Age (2002) and Robots (2005). Saldanha was nominated in 2003 for an Academy Award for Best Animated Short Film for Gone Nutty and in 2018 for Best Animated Feature for Ferdinand.

== Early life ==
Saldanha was born in Brazil, growing up in Marechal Hermes, Rio de Janeiro. Though he loved cartoons and drawing from an early age, by the time he was an adult, he initially considered a career in computer science, because he did not think a career in art was a viable option. This changed when he became aware of how CGI was revolutionizing animation, and discovered the continuing education program at the School of Visual Arts in Manhattan. He entered that program to major in computer animation, saying, "I knew from the first day in class that this was what I wanted to do for the rest of my life". One of his instructors, recognizing his talent, convinced him to enroll in the school's MFA program. Though Saldanha and his wife, Isabella Scarpa, thought this was a risk, they opted to stay in Manhattan so that Saldanha could do so. While at SVA, he completed two prizewinning film shorts that were featured in film festivals around the world. It was also at SVA that Saldanha met MFA instructor and future film directing collaborator Chris Wedge, who invited Saldanha to join Wedge's company Blue Sky Studios. Saldanha graduated from SVA with a master's degree in Computer Art in 1993.

== Career ==
During its fledgling years, Blue Sky Studios provided visual effects and animated TV commercials. In 2002, Saldanha and Wedge co-directed the animated feature 2002 film Ice Age. The movie was a success, with an opening weekend gross of $46.3 million, the best March opening ever. After co-directing the 2005 animated film Robots, he broke his previous March opening record with the sequel, Ice Age: The Meltdown, which Saldanha directed by himself. He would later direct the 2009 sequel, Ice Age: Dawn of the Dinosaurs. Desiring a change of location after directing three films set in icy locales, Saldanha's next project was the 2011 film Rio, which is set in Saldanha's hometown of Rio de Janeiro. Saldanha, who felt that Rio had never been fully portrayed on film, felt a responsibility to travel to the city with the other animators so that they could accurately capture Rio's unique environment and habitats. The movie grossed a reported $484 million worldwide.

In October 2012, Saldanha signed a five-year exclusive deal with 20th Century Fox to develop and produce animated and live-action projects. For this purpose, he formed in June 2013 a Fox-based production company named BottleCap Productions. In 2014, Rio 2 was released, which he directed and co-wrote. For 2017, he directed an animated feature film adaptation of The Story of Ferdinand, which was nominated for the Academy Award for Best Animated Feature. Saldanha is also directing for Fox a live-action adaptation of Royden Lepp's graphic novel Rust: Visitor in the Field, which he planned to make before Ferdinand. He was also developing an animated feature film based on a book Alienology from the Ologies fantasy book series.

In January 2022, it was announced that Saldanha would direct Harold and the Purple Crayon for Columbia Pictures and Davis Entertainment. The film, which is also the first to be directed by Saldanha since 2017, was released on August 2, 2024 grossing only ~17.6M domestically and ~31.6M worldwide against a $40M budget, falling short of profitability. By measurable metrics (critical reception, box office, and awards attention), it is considered the worst film in Saldanha's career.

== Personal life ==
Saldanha and his wife, mathematician Isabella Scarpa, initially lived in a studio apartment in Manhattan's Greenwich Village, but after their second daughter was born, they moved to Hoboken, New Jersey, where they had friends. They continue to live there with their children, Manoela, Sofia, Julia and Rafael. Saldanha, Isabella and their oldest daughter compete in the HOHA (Hoboken Harriers Running Club), a 5k race. Manoela and Sofia voiced a "porcupine-like critter" called "Molehog" in the film Ice Age: The Meltdown, directed by their father. In Rio, Sofia voiced Linda Gunderson as a child.

== Filmography ==
=== Feature films ===
Year	Title	Director	Story	Executive Producer	Other	Voice	Notes
1996	Joe's Apartment	No	No	No	Yes		Supervising animator: Blue Sky Studios
1997	A Simple Wish	No	No	No	Yes		Creative supervisor: Blue Sky Studios
1999	Fight Club	No	No	No	Yes		Supervising animator: Blue Sky Studios
2002	Ice Age	Co-Director	No	No	No		
2005	Robots	Co-Director	No	No	No		
2006	Ice Age: The Meltdown	Yes	No	No	Yes	Dodo	
2009	Ice Age: Dawn of the Dinosaurs	Yes	No	No	Yes	Dinosaur Babies / Flightless Bird	
2011	Rio	Yes	Yes	No	Yes	Second Waiter	Additional Voices
2012	Ice Age: Continental Drift	No	No	Yes	No		
2014	Rio 2	Yes	Yes	No	Yes	Amazon Quail	Additional Voices
2014	Rio, I Love You	Segment	No	No	No		Segment: "Pas de Deux"
2016	Ice Age: Collision Course	No	No	Yes	No		
2017	Ferdinand	Yes	No	No	Yes	Screaming Matador	Additional Voices
2019	Spies in Disguise	No	No	No	Yes		Senior Creative Team
2023	Nimona	No	No	No	Yes		Blue Sky Studios
2024	Harold and the Purple Crayon	Yes	No	No	No		
2026	100 Days	Yes	No	Yes	No		Docudrama

=== Short films ===
Year	Title	Director	Animator	Executive Producer	Other	Notes
1998	Bunny	No	Yes	No	No	
2002	Gone Nutty	Yes	No	No	No	
2006	No Time for Nuts	No	No	Yes	No	
2008	Surviving Sid	No	No	Yes	No	
2011	Scrat's Continental Crack-Up Part 2	No	No	Yes	No	Acts as Ice Age: Continental Drift Teaser Trailer #2
2015	Cosmic Scrat-tastrophe	No	No	Yes	No	Acts as extended Ice Age: Collision Course Teaser Trailer
2016	Scrat: Spaced Out	No	No	Uncredited	No	Ice Age: Collision Course archive and deleted footage
2022	Ice Age: Scrat Tales	No	No	No	Yes	Disney+ Original Short Films; Ice Age Creative Trust

=== Television ===
Year	Title	Creator	Executive Producer	Notes
2011	Ice Age: A Mammoth Christmas	No	Yes	TV special
2016	Ice Age: The Great Egg-Scapade	No	Yes	TV special
2021-23	Invisible City	Yes	Yes	Netflix Original Series
2023	How To Be a Carioca	Yes	Yes	

== Critical reception ==
Film	Rotten Tomatoes	Metacritic
Ice Age: The Meltdown (2006)	57%	58
Ice Age: Dawn of the Dinosaurs (2009)	46%	50
Rio (2011)	72%	63
Rio 2 (2014)	48%	49
Ferdinand (2017)	71%	58

== Awards and nominations ==
Year	Award	Category	Film	Result
2003	Annie Award	Outstanding Directing in an Animated Feature Production; Shared with Chris Wedge	Ice Age	Nominated
2003	DVD Exclusive Award	Best Audio Commentary, New Release; Shared with Chris Wedge	Ice Age	Nominated
2003	DVD Exclusive Award	Best New, Enhanced or Reconstructed Movie Scenes; Shared with John C. Donkin	Ice Age	Nominated
2004	Academy Award	Best Animated Short Film	Gone Nutty	Nominated
2004	Annecy International Animated Film Festival	The Annecy Cristal	Gone Nutty	Nominated
2007	Annie Award	Best Directing in an Animated Feature Production	Ice Age: The Meltdown	Nominated
2007	Satellite Awards	Satellite Award for Best Animated or Mixed Media Feature	Ice Age: The Meltdown	Nominated
2010	Saturn Award	Best Animated Film	Ice Age: Dawn of the Dinosaurs	Nominated
2010	Russian National Movie Awards	Best Animated Feature Film	Ice Age: Dawn of the Dinosaurs	Won
2012	Annie Award	Best Directing in an Animated Feature Production	Rio	Nominated
2012	Cinema Brazil Grand Prize	Best Foreign-Language Film (Melhor Filme Estrangeiro)	Rio	Nominated
2012	Cinema Brazil Grand Prize	Best Foreign-Language Film (Melhor Filme Estrangeiro) - Audience Award	Rio	Won
2012	Italian Online Movie Award	Best Animated Feature Film (Miglior film d'animazione)	Rio	Nominated
2012	St. Louis Gateway Film Critics Association	Best Animated Feature Film	Rio	Nominated
2014	BAFTA Children's Awards	BAFTA Kids Vote - Feature Film; Shared with Bruce Anderson, John C. Donkin, Don Rhymer, Carlos Kotkin, Jenny Bicks & Yoni Brenner	Rio 2	Nominated
2014	CinemaCon Award	International Filmmaker of the Year		Won
2015	Visual Effects Society Award	Outstanding Animation in an Animated Feature Motion Picture; Shared with Bruce Anderson, John C. Donkin and Kirk Garfield	Rio 2	Nominated
2018	Golden Globe Awards	Best Animated Feature Film	Ferdinand	Nominated
2018	Academy Award	Academy Award for Best Animated Feature	Ferdinand	Nominated
