= Chill Factor (film) =

1999 film by Hugh Johnson

- Theatrical release poster
- Directed by: Hugh Johnson
- Written by: Drew Gitlin; Mike Cheda
- Produced by: James G. Robinson
- Starring: Cuba Gooding Jr.; Skeet Ulrich
- Cinematography: David Gribble
- Edited by: Pamela Power
- Music by: Hans Zimmer; John Powell
- Production company: Morgan Creek Productions
- Distributed by: Warner Bros.
- Release date: September 1, 1999
- Running time: 102 minutes
- Country: United States
- Language: English
- Budget: $34–70 million
- Box office: $11.8 million

Chill Factor is a 1999 American buddy action comedy film directed by cinematographer Hugh Johnson (in his only directorial effort), starring Cuba Gooding Jr. and Skeet Ulrich. The film centers on two unwitting civilians who are forced to protect a deadly chemical weapon from the hands of a group of mercenaries planning to sell the weapon to the highest bidder.

The film was produced by Morgan Creek Entertainment and released by Warner Bros. on September 1, 1999. Chill Factor received negative reviews from film critics, and was one of the biggest box office flops in history, grossing $11.8 million worldwide on an estimated $34–70 million budget.

== Plot ==
10 years after one of Dr Richard Long's military experiments went wrong and killed 18 US servicemen and a medical assistant, he has become a recluse in the small town of Jerome, Montana. He still conducts scientific experiments at the local base, and his only social activity is going fly-fishing with Tim Mason, a cook in the local run-down cafe.

Long is murdered by Colonel Andrew Brynner, a former Army officer with liberal vierws who was scapegoated for failure of Long's experiment and served 10 years in prison. When Brynner emergres from prison in a cold rage and bearing a score to settle with the government, he assembles a team of mercenaries and plans to steal and then sell the highly volatile, blue crystal substance (known as 'Elvis'), to the highest bidder in revenge for his incarceration.

Brynner and his team attack the US Army research center where the chemical weapon is being stored, killing some of the Army MP's who were stationed at the base and Dr. Long.

Unfortunately for Brynner, Long has already delivered the crystals to Tim, along with directions that the substance must remain below 50 degrees, or it will detonate, causing enormous casualties.

After Mason meets ice cream delivery man Arlo, they have a run-in with Brynner and set off with the crystals under refrigeration in Arlo's ice cream truck, to Fort Magruder which is 90 miles away. The two don't get along, with Arlo only agreeing to transport the crystals after Mason holds a gun on him — as the journey continues though, they find a common bond in trying to avoid Brynner and his team.

With the help of a Colonel Leo Vitelli, who is after Brynner, Arlo and Mason try to survive various attacks, avoid the local deputy who is convinced they are criminals, all the while trying to keep the crystals below fifty degrees, to stop them exploding.

Arlo and Mason finally reach the base but get ambushed by Brynner and his team who plan on detonating the device in an abandoned weapons test facility. Brynner does not want to leave witnesses and decides to kill both of them. The military arrives and rescues Arlo and Mason before the device explodes, killing Brynner and his men.

Colonel Vitelli arrives and congratulates them on a job well done, but Arlo and Mason threaten to expose the U.S. government for using unstable nuclear weapons for the past decade. Vitelli decides to pay them both to keep them silent but also threatens to have them killed if they say a word about what had happened. All three of them leave the area in a helicopter.

== Cast ==
- Cuba Gooding Jr. as Arlo
- Skeet Ulrich as Tim Mason
- Peter Firth as Col. Andrew Brynner
- David Paymer as Dr. Richard Long
- Hudson Leick as Vaughn
- Daniel Hugh Kelly as Col. Leo Vitelli
- Kevin J. O'Connor as Telstar
- Rhoda Griffis as Pregnant Woman
- Jordan Mott as Carl
- Judson Mills as Dennis
- David "Shark" Fralick as Blonde Biker

== Production ==
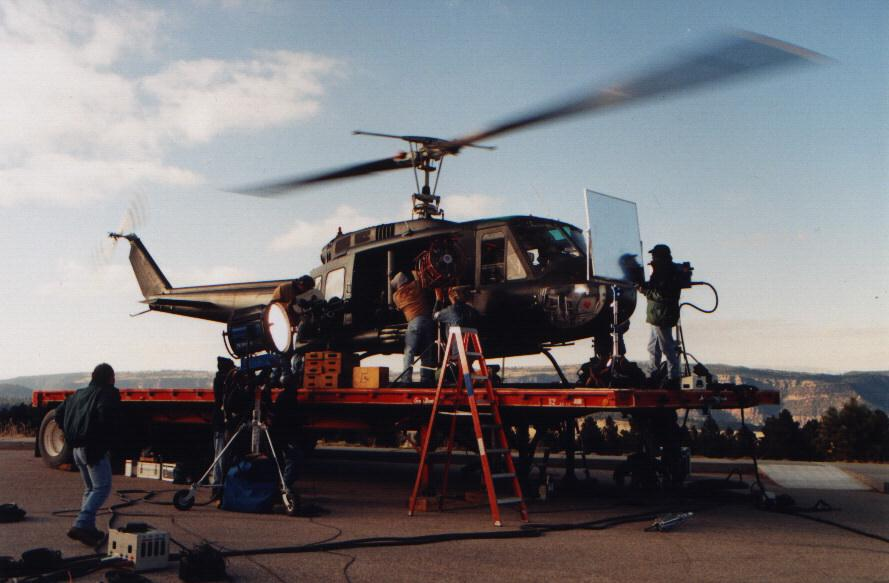
Helicopter pilot Ray McCort filming Chill factor

Ulrich and Gooding were both cast in September 1998 and principal photography began on 5 October. Although the film is set in Montana, most of it was shot in Liberty, South Carolina (for the diner sequences) and parts of Northeastern Utah, in particular the Flaming Gorge Dam. Production was completed on December 22, 1998.

== Release ==
Chill Factor was released on September 1, 1999, in 2,558 theatres, and it made $5,810,531 in its opening weekend.

== Reception ==
=== Box office ===
Chill Factor had a gross box office of $11.2 million on a budget of $34–70 million.

=== Critical reception ===
The film generally received negative reviews. On Rotten Tomatoes, it has an approval rating of 10% based on 79 reviews, with an average rating of 3.6/10. The site's consensus states: "Claiming it fails on every level, critics had almost nothing good to say about this movie." Metacritic reports a score of 33 out of 100 based on 25 reviews, indicating "generally unfavorable" reviews. Audiences polled by CinemaScore gave the film an average grade of "B−" on an A+ to F scale.

Roger Ebert described the film as "cliché" in every sense of the word. Total Film, however, reviewed the film favourably, awarding it 3 stars out of 5.
