= Monster Trucks (film) =

2016 film by Chris Wedge

- Theatrical release poster by Steven Chorney
- Directed by: Chris Wedge
- Screenplay by: Derek Connolly
- Story by: Matthew Robinson; Jonathan Aibel Glenn Berger
- Produced by: Mary Parent; Denis L. Stewart
- Starring: Lucas Till; Jane Levy; Barry Pepper; Thomas Lennon; Rob Lowe; Danny Glover; Amy Ryan; Holt McCallany; Frank Whaley
- Cinematography: Don Burgess
- Edited by: Conrad Buff IV
- Music by: Dave Sardy
- Production companies: Paramount Animation; Nickelodeon Movies; Disruption Entertainment
- Distributed by: Paramount Pictures
- Release dates: December 21, 2016 (France); January 13, 2017 (United States)
- Running time: 105 minutes
- Country: United States
- Language: English
- Budget: $125 million
- Box office: $64.5 million

Monster Trucks is a 2016 American monster comedy film produced by Paramount Animation, Nickelodeon Movies and Disruption Entertainment for Paramount Pictures. It was directed by Chris Wedge, in both his live-action directorial debut and first directorial effort outside of his own company Blue Sky Studios, and written by Derek Connolly, from a story by Matthew Robinson, Jonathan Aibel and Glenn Berger. The film stars Lucas Till, Jane Levy, Amy Ryan, Rob Lowe, Danny Glover, Barry Pepper, Thomas Lennon, and Holt McCallany, and follows Tripp Coley, a young junkyard employee who finds a subterranean creature living in his truck.

The film was first released on December 21, 2016, in France, then on January 13, 2017, in the United States. It received mixed reviews from critics and was considered by analysts to be a box-office bomb, grossing $64.5 million worldwide against a $125 million budget.

== Plot ==
Terravex Oil is conducting a fracking operation in North Dakota, overseen by CEO Reece Tenneson and geologist Jim Dowd. The operation releases three squid-like creatures from underground and destroys the drilling rig. Terravex captures two, while the third escapes. Meanwhile, high school senior Tripp Coley works at a junkyard, where he builds a pickup truck in hopes of leaving town, although it lacks a working drivetrain. He encounters the escaped creature, captures it, and then loses it before he can contact the authorities.

The next day, Tripp discovers that the creature feeds on oil and has taken shelter under his truck's hood. He befriends it, names it Creech, and promises to help it return home. Tripp modifies the truck so Creech can control it as a makeshift engine, effectively using it as a 'wheelchair'. Meanwhile, Tenneson learns that similar experiments have uncovered other creatures and seeks to protect Terravex's image. He orders poison drilled into a hole leading to the creatures' underwater tunnels and hires mercenary Burke to kill the captured specimens. Dowd objects, having discovered that the creatures possess significant intelligence, emotions, and a hive mind intelligence that allows the specimens to share what one has learned.

Tripp tells his classmate Meredith about Creech, and they seek help from his estranged father Wade. However, Wade betrays Tripp to Burke. Tripp and Meredith flee in the truck with Creech, pursued by Burke's team, and Rick Lovick, Tripp's stepfather and local sheriff. They escape by jumping over a MRL local led by an EMD MP15DC, then hide at a hunting cabin.

When Creech senses that the other creatures are in danger, he heads for Terravex headquarters, where they are imprisoned. Tripp and Meredith follow him and discover Creech's parents, but Terravex workers attack them. Creech is captured, while Tripp and Meredith are taken to Tenneson. Dowd decides to help them rescue the creatures. He acquires two additional trucks and helps modify them so Creech's parents can control them, then steals the Terravex truck transporting the creatures.

At a dealership, Creech's parents take control of the modified trucks, and the group escapes toward the mountain leading to the tunnels. Terravex pursues them, but Rick helps the group evade Burke, first preventing him from ramming them off the road and later stealing a large truck to block the pursuit. After discovering that the poison has been inserted into the drilling site, Tripp confronts Burke, who attempts to push him into the drilling hole. Tripp and Creech overturn Burke's truck, destroying the poison machine and apparently killing Burke when the truck is thrown into the equipment.

Creech saves Tripp from drowning before returning underground with his parents. Terravex's experimentation is exposed for damaging the creatures' habitat, and Tenneson is arrested. Tripp and Rick grow closer and rebuild a V8 engine for Tripp's truck, while Tripp and Meredith begin a relationship.

== Cast ==
- Lucas Till as Tripp Coley, a high school senior.
- Jane Levy as Meredith, Tripp's tutor and love interest.
- Amy Ryan as Cynthia "Cindy" Coley, Tripp's mother, Wade’s ex-wife, and Rick’s new live-in wife.
- Rob Lowe as Reece Tenneson, the CEO of Terravex.
- Danny Glover as Mr. Weathers, Tripp's paraplegic boss.
- Barry Pepper as Sheriff Richard "Rick" Lovick, the local sheriff, Cindy's new live-in husband, and Tripp’s stepfather.
- Holt McCallany as Burke, Reece's henchman.
- Frank Whaley as Wade Coley, Tripp's estranged father and Cindy's ex-husband.
- Thomas Lennon as Dr. Jim Dowd, a scientist.
- Tucker Albrizzi as Sam Geldon, Tripp's friend.
- Samara Weaving as Brianne
- Daniel Bacon as Technician
- Aliyah O'Brien as Junior Scientist

== Production ==
On July 31, 2013, Paramount Animation announced that they were developing a new live-action/animated franchise, with an entry film titled Monster Trucks, and Jonathan Aibel and Glenn Berger set to write the film's script. The pitch was created by Paramount's president Adam Goodman alongside his four-year-old son. Chris Wedge was set to direct the film, with Mary Parent producing and an initial release date set for May 29, 2015. Production took place in Vancouver Film Studios in Vancouver, British Columbia. On February 19, 2014, Jane Levy and Lucas Till joined the cast of the film. On March 24, Amy Ryan was cast in a role, and later that week, Holt McCallany joined the cast as a villain. On April 1, Frank Whaley and Danny Glover joined the cast of the film. Later that month, Thomas Lennon joined as well, and on April 14, Barry Pepper joined the cast. On April 24, Tucker Albrizzi, who starred in Nickelodeon's TV show Big Time Rush, joined the cast, with Rob Lowe added five days later.

In December 2013, it was announced that the film's production would begin in early April 2014 in Vancouver, with filming wrapping up in mid-July, and the studio Vancouver Film Studios was booked for the production. Principal photography began on April 4, 2014, in Kamloops. Filming was spotted on May 13, 2014, in downtown Chilliwack.

== Release ==
Due to poor test screening reactions, which resulted in a total redesign of Creech after complaints that he was too frightening for a younger audience, the release date was shifted several times. It was initially set for May 29, 2015, but on January 26, 2015, the film was pushed back to December 25, 2015, a date first assigned for Mission: Impossible – Rogue Nation. On May 5, 2015, the film was pushed back again, to March 18, 2016. On November 10, 2015, the film's release date was pushed back one final time, to January 13, 2017, with The Little Prince taking over the original release date.

On September 21, 2016, The Hollywood Reporter stated Paramount would take a $115 million writedown on the film because of its expected poor performance at the box office.

=== Home media ===
Monster Trucks was released on Digital HD on March 28, 2017 and on Blu-ray and DVD on April 11, 2017.

== Reception ==
=== Box office ===
Monster Trucks grossed $33.4 million in the United States and Canada and $31.1 million in other territories, for a worldwide total of $64.5 million.

In North America, Monster Trucks was released alongside the openings of The Bye Bye Man and Sleepless, as well as the wide releases of Silence, Patriots Day and Live by Night, and was expected to gross $8–10 million from 3,119 theaters in its opening weekend. It ended up making $11 million ($14.2 million over the four-day MLK weekend), finishing 7th at the box office.

Due to its $125 million budget, as well as additional amounts spent on promotion, the film was considered by analysts to be a box-office bomb. Deadline Hollywood calculated the film lost Paramount $123.1 million, when factoring together all expenses and revenues.

=== Critical response ===
On review aggregator website Rotten Tomatoes, the film has an approval rating of 32% based on 98 reviews and an average rating of 4.6/10. The website's critical consensus reads, "Despite flashes of inspiration, the singularly high-concept Monster Trucks shows that it takes more than monsters and trucks to create a compelling feature film." On Metacritic, the film has a score of 41 out of 100 based on 23 critics, indicating "mixed or average reviews".

Some contemporary reviews were more complimentary, however. Kristy Puchko cited it as a "treasure that feels like a heady relic from the '90s" in IndieWire's 2017 critic's survey of the Craziest Hollywood Movies of the 21st Century, while SG Egan called it a "live-action cartoon that recalls the goofy, good-hearted Amblin family films of yore" in AM New York Metro's Best Films of 2017 list. Further, audiences polled by CinemaScore gave the film an average grade of "A" on an A+ to F scale.

By 2021, the film's reputation had improved slightly, with Lisa Laman of Looper observing that a cult following had developed for the film, while Chris Evangelista penned an essay for The Guardian arguing for the film's merits.

== Possible sequel ==
Lennon mentioned on his Twitter in 2022 that he is still under contract for two sequels.
