= Larry Elin =

Larry Elin was the Vice President and Executive Producer at MAGI Synthavision during the production of TRON. He started his career as one of the first computer modelers and animators and cgi technical directors at Mathematical Applications Group, Inc., in Elmsford, NY, in 1973, which was also one of the first 3-D computer animation companies.

As VP and head of production, Elin hired Chris Wedge, Tom Bisogno, John Beech, Ken Perlin and Nancy Campy to assist in the production work on the feature film Tron. Notable animation under Larry Elin's direction included the Lightcycle, Recognizer, and Tank sequences. Elin later became executive producer at Kroyer Films, which produced the animation for FernGully: The Last Rainforest.

Larry Elin was most recently an associate professor in the Television, Radio, and Film Department at the S.I Newhouse School of Public Communications at Syracuse University. He taught media business, interactive media, animation and special effects, and introductory storytelling classes. He retired at the end of 2017 after 20 years at the university.
