= Steve Martino =

American designer and film director (born 1959)

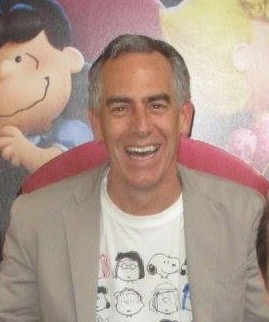
- Martino at the 2015 Annecy International Animated Film Festival
- Born: Stephen Michael Martino; July 21, 1959 (age 67); Dayton, Ohio, U.S.
- Education: Ohio State University
- Occupations: Designer; film director
- Years active: 1990–present
- Employer(s): Blue Sky Studios (2001–2021); WildBrain (2021–present)

Stephen Michael Martino (born July 21, 1959) is an American designer and film director. He is best known for directing the Blue Sky Studios films Dr, Seuss' Horton Hears a Who! (2008), Ice Age: Continental Drift (2012), and The Peanuts Movie (2015).

== Early life ==
Martino went to Ohio State University, where he studied design. After graduation, he heard computer animation pioneer Chuck Csuri speak. "I was absolutely blown away. No one was doing what he was showing us. I hadn't seen images like that anywhere before," Martino said. He returned to the university and earned in 1989 a master's degree, studying at the Computer Graphics Research Group (later renamed to Advanced Computing Center for the Arts and Design), founded by Csuri.

== Career ==
After graduation, Martino went to Los Angeles, where he worked in visual effects and animation. In 2001, he joined Connecticut-based Blue Sky Studios. There he co-directed the animated films Horton Hears a Who! (2008) and Ice Age: Continental Drift. He also directed The Peanuts Movie (2015), an animated feature film adaptation of Charles M. Schulz's US comic strip Peanuts.

In February 2018, it was reported that Martino and Karen Disher would direct the animated fantasy musical, under the working title Foster, for Blue Sky Studios. The film was originally scheduled for release on March 5, 2021. However, following Disney's acquisition of Fox, it was pulled from the release schedule. The production studio was closed in 2021.

In November 2023, WildBrain Studios announced that Martino will direct an animated Peanuts film for Apple TV+.

== Filmography ==
=== Director ===
Film

- Dr. Seuss' Horton Hears a Who! (2008)
- Ice Age: Continental Drift (2012)
- The Peanuts Movie (2015)
- Snoopy Unleashed (2027)

Short film

- Scrat's Continental Crack-up (2010)
- Scrat's Continental Crack-up - Part 2 (2011)

=== Art director ===
Film

- Robots (2005)

Short Films

- Gone Nutty (2002)

Television

- World of Discovery (1990) (Main titles designer)

=== Other roles ===
- Ice Age: The Meltdown (2006) (Pre-Production Consultant)
- Spies in Disguise (2019) (Senior Creative Team)
- Nimona (2023) (Special Thanks)

== Critical reception ==
Film	Rotten Tomatoes	Metacritic
Horton Hears a Who! (2008)	76%	71%
Ice Age: Continental Drift (2012)	37%	49%
The Peanuts Movie (2015)	87%	67%

== Awards and nominations ==
Year	Award	Category	Work	Result
1991	Primetime Emmy Award	Outstanding Achievement in Graphic Design and Title Sequences	World of Discovery; Shared with Jeff Doud, Jon Townley and Thomas Barham	Won
2006	Annie Award	Best Production Design in an Animated Feature Production	Robots; Shared with William Joyce	Nominated
2016	Annie Award	Outstanding Achievement in Directing in an Animated Feature Production	The Peanuts Movie	Nominated
2016	African-American Film Critics Association	Best Animated Feature	The Peanuts Movie	Won
2016	Golden Globe Awards	Best Animated Feature	The Peanuts Movie	Nominated
2016	Seattle Film Critics Award	Best Animated Feature	The Peanuts Movie	Nominated
