= Bunny (1998 film) =

1998 short film by Chris Wedge

- Promotional poster
- Directed by: Chris Wedge
- Written by: Chris Wedge
- Produced by: Nina Rappaport
- Edited by: Tim Nordquist
- Music by: Tom Waits; Kathleen Brennan
- Production company: Blue Sky Studios
- Release date: November 2, 1998
- Running time: 7 minutes
- Country: United States

Bunny is a 1998 American animated short film by Chris Wedge produced by Blue Sky Studios. It was featured on the original 2-disc special edition DVD release of Ice Age from 2002 and the 2006 "Super-Cool Edition" re-release to coincide with the release of Ice Age: The Meltdown.

The film was influenced by the Uncle Wiggily illustrations by Lansing Campbell, and features music composed by Tom Waits and Kathleen Brennan.

Bunny won the Academy Award for Best Animated Short Film in 1998 and a Golden Nica at the Prix Ars Electronica.

== Plot ==
Bunny, an elderly female rabbit, lives alone in a small cabin in the forest. While baking a cake one night, she is continually bothered by a large moth that keeps flying around her kitchen. No matter what she does, she cannot get rid of the intruder; she is especially annoyed when it runs into a photograph, taken many years ago, of herself and her late husband on their wedding day. At one point, she accidentally knocks it into the cake batter, which she quickly and angrily mixes before pouring into a pan and shoving into the oven. She then sets the kitchen timer and falls asleep, only to be awakened by loud rumblings and a blue-white light coming from the oven, whose door soon falls open. Crawling inside, she finds herself face-to-face with the moth and begins to float through an otherworldly space toward the source of the light, with a pair of giant moth wings sprouting from her back to propel her as the insect leads her along. She is soon revealed to be among dozens of moths being drawn to the light. The film ends with a close-up of the wedding photo, which comes to life as the younger Bunny nestles her head contentedly on her husband's shoulder; the shadows and reflections of two of the moths play across the image as well.

During his introduction to the film on the Ice Age DVD, Wedge offers his take of these events: Bunny dies in her sleep, and the oven serves as a gateway to the afterlife. Her spirit is instinctively drawn into it, as a moth going toward a bright light, and is finally reunited with her husband.

== Accolades ==
- 1999: Academy Award for Best Animated Short Film (won)
