= Hugh Johnson (cinematographer) =

Irish cinematographer and film director

- Born: 25 April 1946; Navan, County Meath, Ireland
- Died: 4 June 2015 (aged 69); Los Angeles, California, U.S.
- Occupations: Cinematographer, film director
- Years active: 1974–2011
- Partner: Catherine Deneuve (1982–1983)

Hugh T. Johnson (25 April 1946 – 4 June 2015) was an Irish cinematographer and director, best known for his work with Ridley Scott and Tony Scott.

== Early life and career ==
Born in Navan, County Meath, Johnson moved to London in the 1960s, where he started working at a photography studio in Soho.

He was a founding member of Ridley Scott Associates, shooting numerous commercials in the 1970s for Scott and his brother, as well as for Alan Parker and Hugh Hudson.

== Filmography ==
Cinematographer

Year	Title	Director	Notes
1996	White Squall	Ridley Scott	
1997	G.I. Jane	Ridley Scott	Also 2nd unit director
2004	The Chronicles of Riddick	David Twohy	
2006	Eragon	Stefen Fangmeier	
2008	From a Place of Darkness	Douglas A. Raine	Also 2nd unit director
2008	A Line in the Sand	Jeffrey Chernov	
2011	Two Friendly Ghosts	Parker Ellerman	Short film
2011	Shinya Kimura	Henrik Hansen	Documentary short

Director

- Chill Factor (1999)
