= Chris Wedge =

American filmmaker (born 1957)

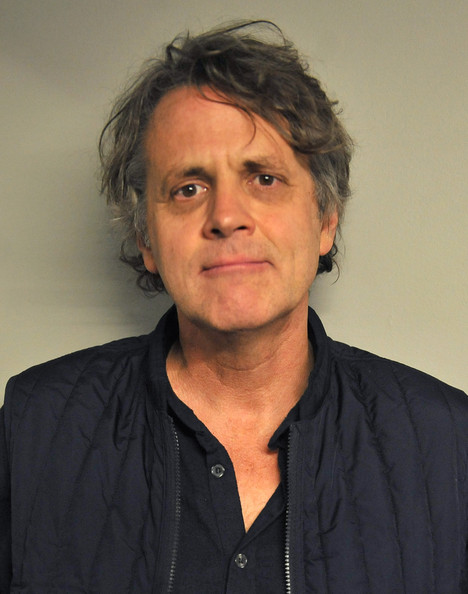
- Wedge in 2014
- Born: John Christian Wedge; March 20, 1957 (age 69); Binghamton, New York, U.S.
- Education: State University of New York at Purchase (BFA); Ohio State University (MA)
- Occupations: Filmmaker; animator; designer; voice actor; cartoonist
- Years active: 1982–present
- Employers: MAGI (1982–1985); Blue Sky Studios (1987–2021); Annapurna Animation (2023–present)
- Spouse: Jeanne Markel
- Children: 2
- Awards: Academy Award for Best Animated Short Film; Bunny (1998)

John Christian Wedge (born March 20, 1957) is an American filmmaker, animator, and voice actor. He is best known for being the lead animator of the sci-fi action film Tron (1982), co-founding Blue Sky Studios, and directing the short film Bunny (1998) and the feature films Ice Age (2002), Robots (2005) and Epic (2013). He also directed the live-action film Monster Trucks (2016). Wedge has received two Academy Awards nominations: one for Bunny, for which he won Best Animated Short; and Ice Age, nominated for Best Animated Feature. He also created and voiced the character Scrat in the Ice Age franchise (2002–present).

== Early life ==
Wedge was born in Binghamton, New York. During his teenage years, Wedge lived in Watertown, New York which was rumored to be the inspiration for the town where his film Robots takes place, however he later dismissed this in an interview. He became interested in animation when he was 12 years old: "Back then, there was a TV special about kids making cut-out animation in a workshop—as I recall it was Yellow Ball Workshop—it was a clear technique to follow and I followed it. That fascinated me and it got me started. It was so simple, effective and magical in outcome and I stuck with creating things throughout my childhood, teenage years and then college."

He attended Fayetteville-Manlius High School, graduating in 1975. He received his BFA in Film from State University of New York at Purchase in Purchase, New York in 1981, and subsequently earned his MA in computer graphics and art education at the Ohio State University. He has taught animation at the School of Visual Arts in New York City where he met his future film directing partner, Carlos Saldanha.

== Career ==
In 1982, Wedge worked for MAGi/SynthaVision, where he was a principal animator on the Disney film Tron, credited as a scene programmer. Some of his other works include The Brave Little Toaster.

Wedge is one of the founders of Blue Sky Studios, once one of the exclusive computer animation studios, and was its Vice President of Creative Development until the studio was closed by The Walt Disney Company in 2021. He is the owner of WedgeWorks, a film production company founded by Wedge.

In the 1990s, he and his studio worked on CGI visual effects for the movies Alien Resurrection and Titan A.E.

In 1998, he won an Academy Award for the short animated film Bunny. Wedge later directed Blue Sky Studios' first computer-animated film, 2002's Ice Age, and served as executive producer for its sequels. He also voices Scrat in the film series, performing the character's "squeaks and squeals." In 2005, Wedge directed Robots, based on a story he created with William Joyce. In 2013 followed Epic, loosely based on Joyce's book, The Leaf Men and the Brave Good Bugs.

In 2008, it was announced that Wedge would direct Hugo, though he was subsequently replaced by Martin Scorsese. In 2009, it was reported that Wedge would direct an animated feature film adaptation of Will Wright's Spore, but since then there has been no further news about the film.

Wedge directed the science fiction/action film Monster Trucks (2016). Jonathan Aibel and Glenn Berger wrote the script for the film, produced by Mary Parent.

Wedge reprised the role of Scrat in a series of shorts for Disney+ titled Ice Age: Scrat Tales. The shorts premiered on the streaming platform on April 13, 2022.

In 2023, it was announced that Wedge had joined Annapurna Animation, which had revived Nimona after it had been initially canceled following the closure of Blue Sky Studios, where he would direct a new animated film called FOO about "the first fish ever to climb out of the water and onto land."

== Personal life ==
Wedge lives in Katonah, New York with his wife Jeanne Markel. They have two children, Sarah and Jack.

== Filmography ==
=== Feature films ===
Year	Title	Director	Story	Executive Producer	Other	Voice/Role	Notes
1982	Tron	No	No	No	Yes		Scene Programmer: MAGi / SynthaVision (as "Christian Wedge")
1996	Joe's Apartment	No	No	No	Yes		Animation Director
1997	A Simple Wish	No	No	No	Yes		Executive Creative Supervisor: Blue Sky Studios
1997	Alien Resurrection	No	No	No	Yes		Creative Supervisor: Blue Sky Studios Senior Staff
2002	Ice Age	Yes	No	No	Yes	Scrat / Dodo	
2005	Robots	Yes	No	No	Yes	Wonderbot / Phone Booth	
2006	Ice Age: The Meltdown	No	No	Yes	Yes	Scrat	
2008	Dr. Seuss' Horton Hears a Who!	No	No	Yes	No		
2009	Ice Age: Dawn of the Dinosaurs	No	No	Yes	Yes	Scrat	
2011	Rio	No	No	Yes	No		
2011	Adventures in Plymptoons!	No	No	No	Yes	Himself	Documentary
2012	Ice Age: Continental Drift	No	No	Yes	Yes	Scrat	
2013	Epic	Yes	Yes	No	Yes		
2014	Rio 2	No	No	Yes	Yes		
2015	The Peanuts Movie	No	No	No	Yes		Uncredited role
2016	Ice Age: Collision Course	No	No	Yes	Yes	Scrat	
2016	Monster Trucks	Yes	No	No	No		
2017	Ferdinand	No	No	Yes	Yes		
2019	Spies in Disguise	No	No	Yes	Yes		Senior Creative Team
2023	Nimona	No	No	No	Yes		Blue Sky Studios; Special Thanks
2027	Ice Age: Boiling Point	No	No	No	Yes	Scrat	
TBA	FOO	Yes	TBA	TBA	TBA		

=== Short films ===
Year	Title	Director	Writer	Animator	Executive Producer	Other	Voice Role	Notes
1982	The Daymaker	Yes	No	Yes	Producer	No		
1985	Tuber's Two-Step	Yes	No	Yes	Producer	No		
1987	Balloon Guy	Yes	No	Yes	Producer	No		
1990	The Mind's Eye	No	No	No	Producer	No		
1998	Bunny	Yes	Yes	No	No	No		
2002	Gone Nutty	No	No	No	Yes	Yes	Scrat	
2005	Aunt Fanny's Tour of Booty	No	No	No	Yes	Yes	Hacky	
2006	No Time for Nuts	No	No	No	Yes	Yes	Scrat	
2008	Surviving Sid	No	No	No	Yes	Yes	Scrat	
2010	Scrat's Continental Crack-Up	No	No	No	Yes	Yes	Scrat	Act as Ice Age: Continental Drift Teaser Trailers #1 & #2
2011	Scrat's Continental Crack-Up Part 2	No	No	No	Yes	Yes	Scrat	Act as Ice Age: Continental Drift Teaser Trailers #1 & #2
2015	Cosmic Scrat-tastrophe	No	No	No	Yes	Yes	Scrat	Acts as extended Ice Age: Collision Course Teaser Trailer
2016	Scrat: Spaced Out	No	No	No	Uncredited	Yes	Scrat	Ice Age: Collision Course archive and deleted footage
2022	Ice Age: Scrat Tales	No	No	No	No	Yes	Scrat	Disney+ Original Short Films; Ice Age Creative Trust

=== Television episodes and specials ===
Year	Title	Character Designer	Prop Designer	Executive Producer	Other	Voice Role	Notes
1996	Quack Pack	Yes	Yes	No	No		Episode: "Heavy Dental"
2006	Family Guy	No	No	No	Yes	Scrat	Episode: "Sibling Rivalry"
2011	Ice Age: A Mammoth Christmas	No	No	Yes	Yes	Scrat	Television Special
2015	The Simpsons	No	No	No	Yes	Scrat	Episode: "Treehouse of Horror XXVI" (as Chris "Scrat" Wedge)
2016	Ice Age: The Great Egg-Scapade	No	No	Yes	Yes	Scrat	Television Special

=== Video games ===
Year	Title	Voice Role
2006	Ice Age 2: The Meltdown	Scrat
2009	Ice Age: Dawn of the Dinosaurs	Scrat
2012	Ice Age: Continental Drift - Arctic Games	Scrat
2015	Ice Age Avalanche	Scrat
2019	Ice Age: Scrat's Nutty Adventure	Scrat

== Critical reception ==
Film	Rotten Tomatoes	Metacritic
Ice Age (2002)	77%	61%
Robots (2005)	64%	64%
Epic (2013)	64%	52%
Monster Trucks (2016)	32%	41%

== Awards and nominations ==
Year	Award	Category	Work	Result
1996	Ottawa International Animation Festival Award	Best Production Under 10 Minutes in Length	Joe's Apartment	Won
1999	Academy Award	Best Animated Short Film	Bunny	Won
1999	Drama International Short Film Festival Award	Special Prize for Animation	Bunny	Won
1999	Nashville Film Festival Award	Best Animation	Bunny	Won
1999	Jury Award	Best Short	Bunny	Nominated
1999	Oberhausen International Short Film Festival Award	Prize of the Children's Short Film Competition	Bunny	Won
2003	Academy Award	Best Animated Feature	Ice Age	Nominated
2003	Annie Award	Outstanding Directing in an Animated Feature Production; Shared with Carlos Saldanha (co-director)	Ice Age	Nominated
2003	DVD Exclusive Award	Best Audio Commentary, New Release; Shared with Carlos Saldanha (co-director)	Ice Age	Nominated
2003	ShoWest Convention Award	Animation Director of the Year		Won
2013	Behind the Voice Actors Award	Best Vocal Ensemble in a Feature Film; Shared with Ray Romano, Denis Leary, John Leguizamo, Queen Latifah, Keke Palmer, Seann William Scott, Josh Peck, Wanda Sykes, Jennifer Lopez, Alan Tudyk, Joy Behar, Patrick Stewart, Simon Pegg & Rebel Wilson	Ice Age: Continental Drift	Nominated
2014	Annie Award	Outstanding Achievement in Directing in an Animated Feature Production	Epic	Nominated
