= Ice Age: Continental Drift =

2012 American animated film

- Theatrical release poster
- Directed by: Steve Martino; Michael Thurmeier
- Screenplay by: Michael Berg; Jason Fuchs
- Story by: Michael Berg; Lori Forte
- Produced by: Lori Forte; John C. Donkin
- Starring: Ray Romano; John Leguizamo; Denis Leary; Josh Gad; Peter Dinklage; Nicki Minaj; Drake; Wanda Sykes; Jennifer Lopez; Queen Latifah; Seann William Scott; Josh Peck; Keke Palmer
- Cinematography: Renato Falcão
- Edited by: James M. Palumbo; David Ian Salter
- Music by: John Powell
- Production companies: 20th Century Fox Animation; Blue Sky Studios
- Distributed by: 20th Century Fox
- Release dates: June 20, 2012 (CineEurope); July 13, 2012 (United States)
- Running time: 87 minutes
- Country: United States
- Language: English
- Budget: $95 million
- Box office: $877 million

Ice Age: Continental Drift is a 2012 American animated adventure comedy film directed by Steve Martino and Michael Thurmeier and written by Michael Berg and Jason Fuchs. Produced by 20th Century Fox Animation and Blue Sky Studios, it is the fourth installment in the Ice Age film series following Ice Age: Dawn of the Dinosaurs (2009). Ray Romano, John Leguizamo, Denis Leary and Queen Latifah reprise their roles from the previous films, with Jennifer Lopez, Drake and Nicki Minaj joining the cast. The film's plot involves Scrat mistakenly sending Manny, Sid and Diego adrift with Sid's grandmother, leading the herd to face a gang of pirates and plan to find a way back home while evading them.

Ice Age: Continental Drift premiered at CineEurope on June 20, 2012, and was theatrically released in the United States on July 13 by 20th Century Fox. The film received mixed reviews from critics, with praise for its animation and humor, but criticisms for its story and character development. It grossed $877 million worldwide, making it the fifth highest-grossing film and the highest-grossing animated film of 2012. A sequel, Ice Age: Collision Course, was released on July 22, 2016.

== Plot ==
Many years following the third film's events, Manny and Ellie are living happily with their now teenage daughter Peaches. While Ellie tries supporting her daughter, Manny becomes exceedingly overprotective. Meanwhile, Sid's family returns, but only to drop off the elderly Granny before promptly abandoning them both. Manny then catches Peaches hanging out with a group of mammoths he does not approve of, causing friction between the duo.

Shortly after, a sudden continental break-up incited by Scrat separates Manny from Ellie, Peaches, Crash & Eddie, simultaneously trapping him on a moving chunk of ice with Sid, Granny and Diego in tow. Manny has no choice but to ride out the current. At the same time, a giant land shift encroaches on Ellie, Peaches and those remaining on land, forcing them to make their way towards a land bridge in order to get to safety.

After extremely violent weather pushes them further away from land, Manny's group is captured by a band of pirates sailing on a floating iceberg led by Gigantopithecus Captain Gutt, who attempts to press them into his crew. When they refuse, Gutt tries to execute them; this leads to their escape, which inadvertently causes the ship to sink. Gutt's first mate, female sabretooth Shira, reluctantly joins them when they rescue her after she is left for dead.

The Herd washes ashore on Switchback Cove, which gives a current back to their home. After discovering that Gutt has enslaved a group of hyrax and is using them to build a new ship, Manny coordinates a plan with some more hyraxes to free their comrades and steal the ship. Just before they manage to escape aboard it, Diego tries to convince Shira to leave the pirates and join The Herd so she can live a better life, but Shira, while initially accepting, instead stays behind and slows Gutt down so The Herd can escape. Gutt forms yet another ship and plots to avenge himself.

Meanwhile, during the animals' trek to the land bridge back at the mainland, Peaches joins the group of mammoths from before, only to find out that they do not care about the ongoing danger and they look down on her for being friends with molehog Louis, who has a secret crush on her. When Louis overhears Peaches telling the other mammoths that they are not actually friends, she has a change of heart about her new friends, berates them for their cocky attitudes and leaves them.

After narrowly escaping a colony of sirens, Manny, Sid, Diego and Granny return home and find that not only has the land bridge been destroyed, but Gutt has beaten them and taken Ellie, Peaches and the rest of The Herd hostage. A fight ensues, as Granny's pet Livyatan, Precious, arrives and fends off the pirate, while Manny triumphs over Gutt, who is subsequently eaten alive by a siren. Peaches happily reconciles with both Manny and Louis and Shira joins The Herd, starting a relationship with Diego. With their former home destroyed by the land shift, the entire Herd relocates to a lush island, where the hyraxes from earlier have already started rebuilding their civilization.

Meanwhile, having embarked on a journey to find it using an acorn-shaped map, Scrat discovers the island of Scratlantis, but his obession with acorns ends up causing the island and the water to sink into a hole, leaving Scrat in the middle of a desert.

== Voice cast ==
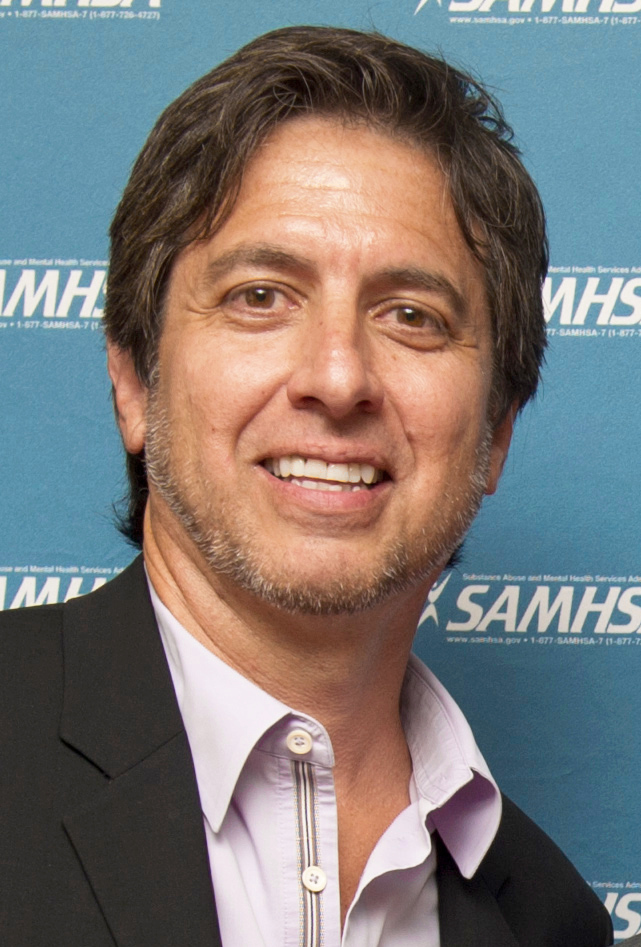
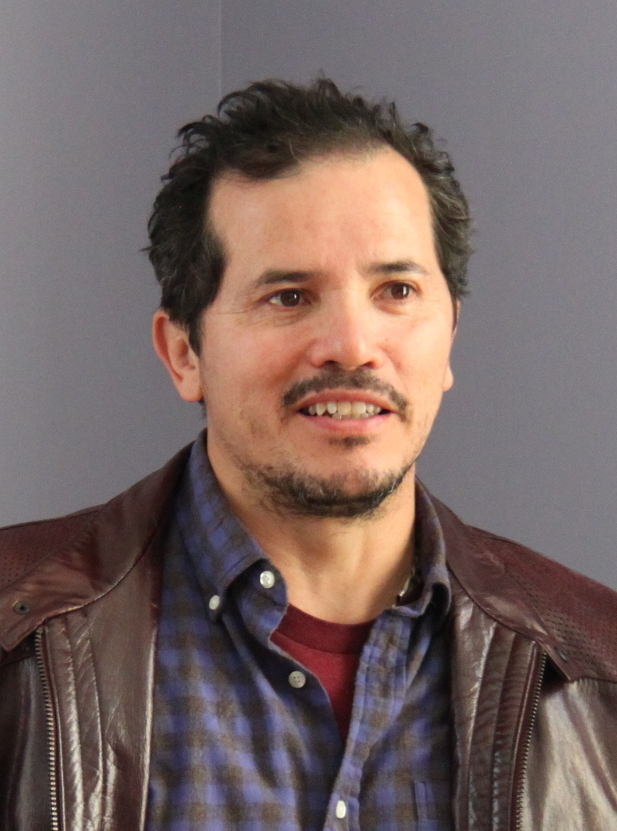
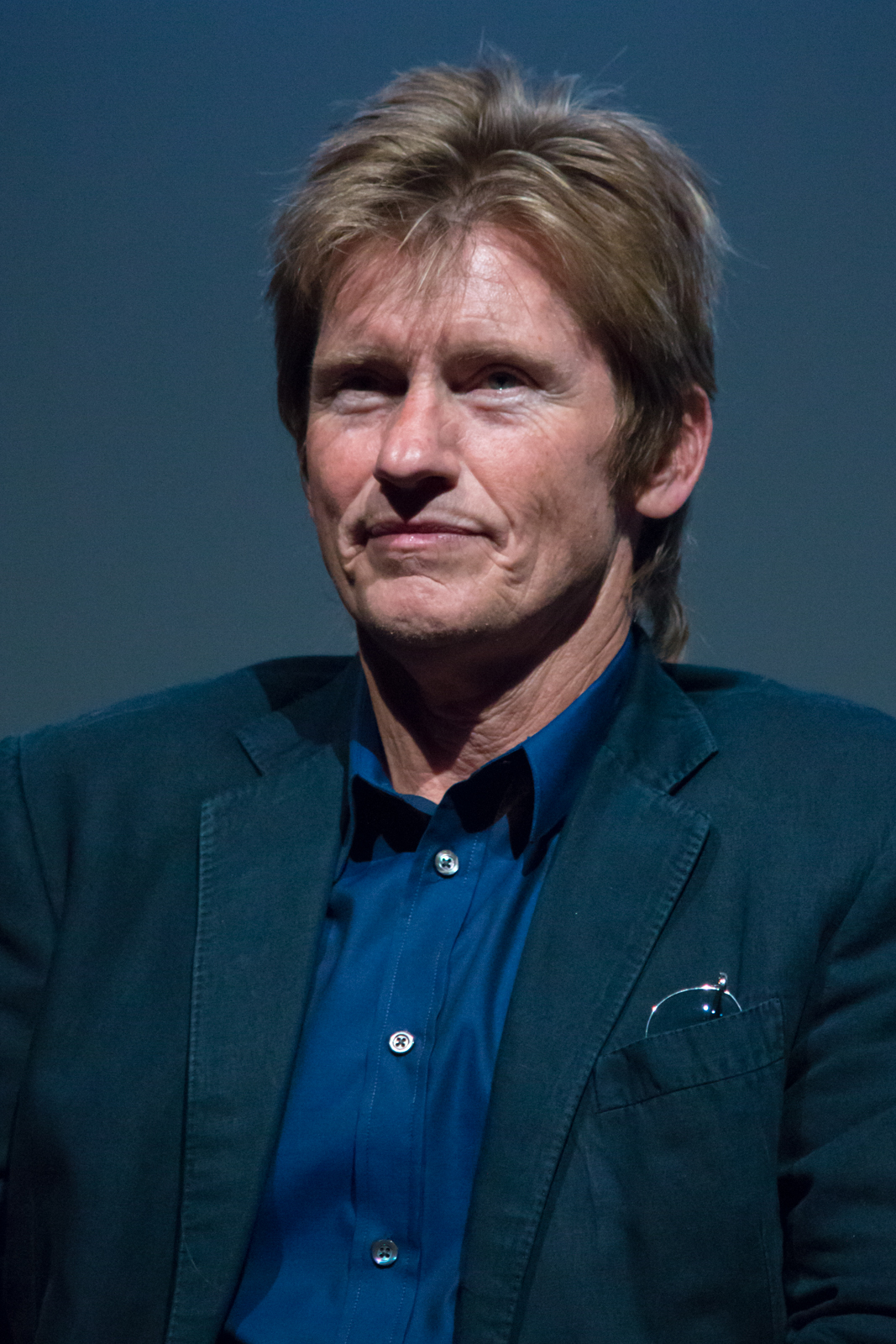
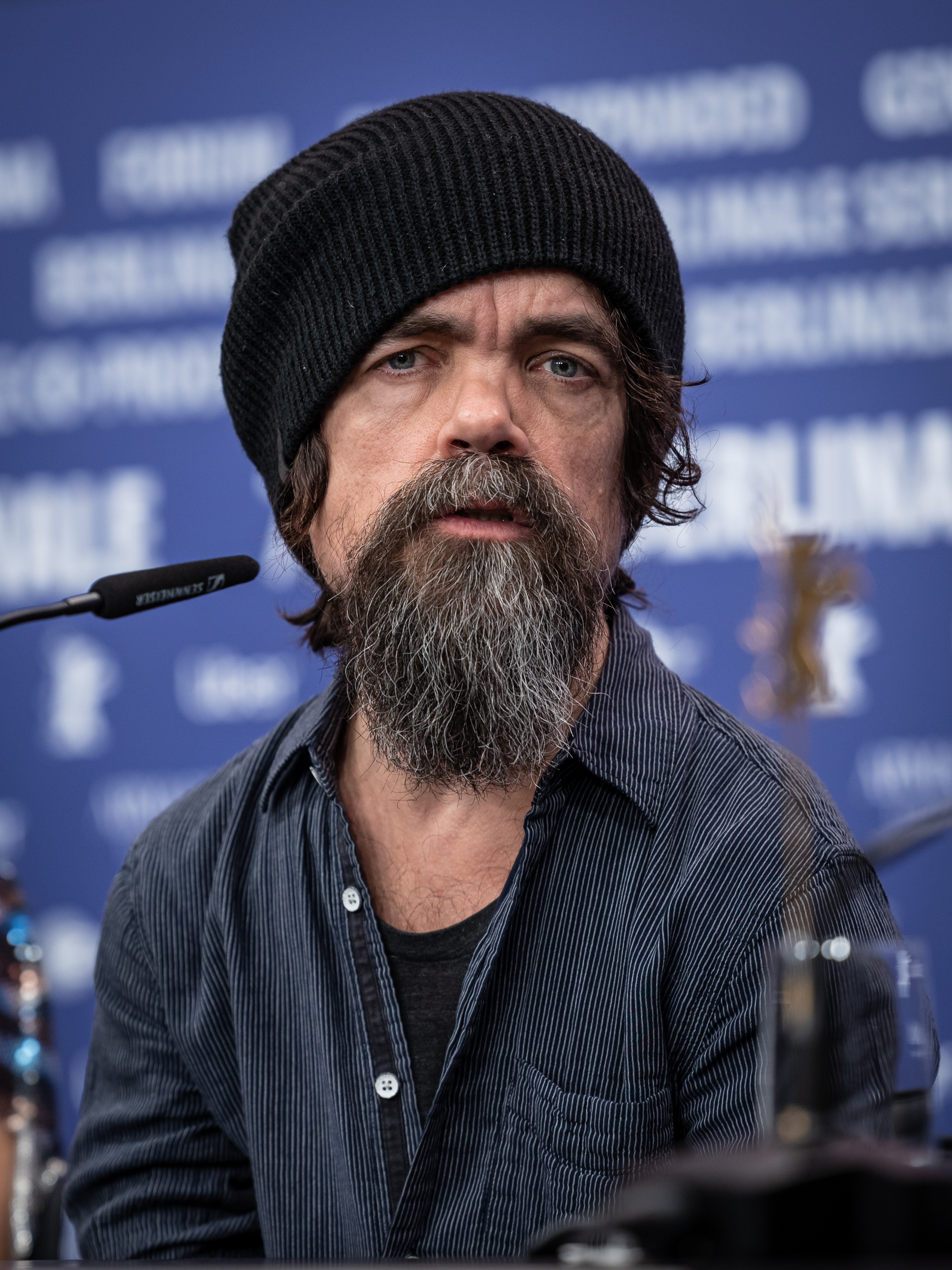
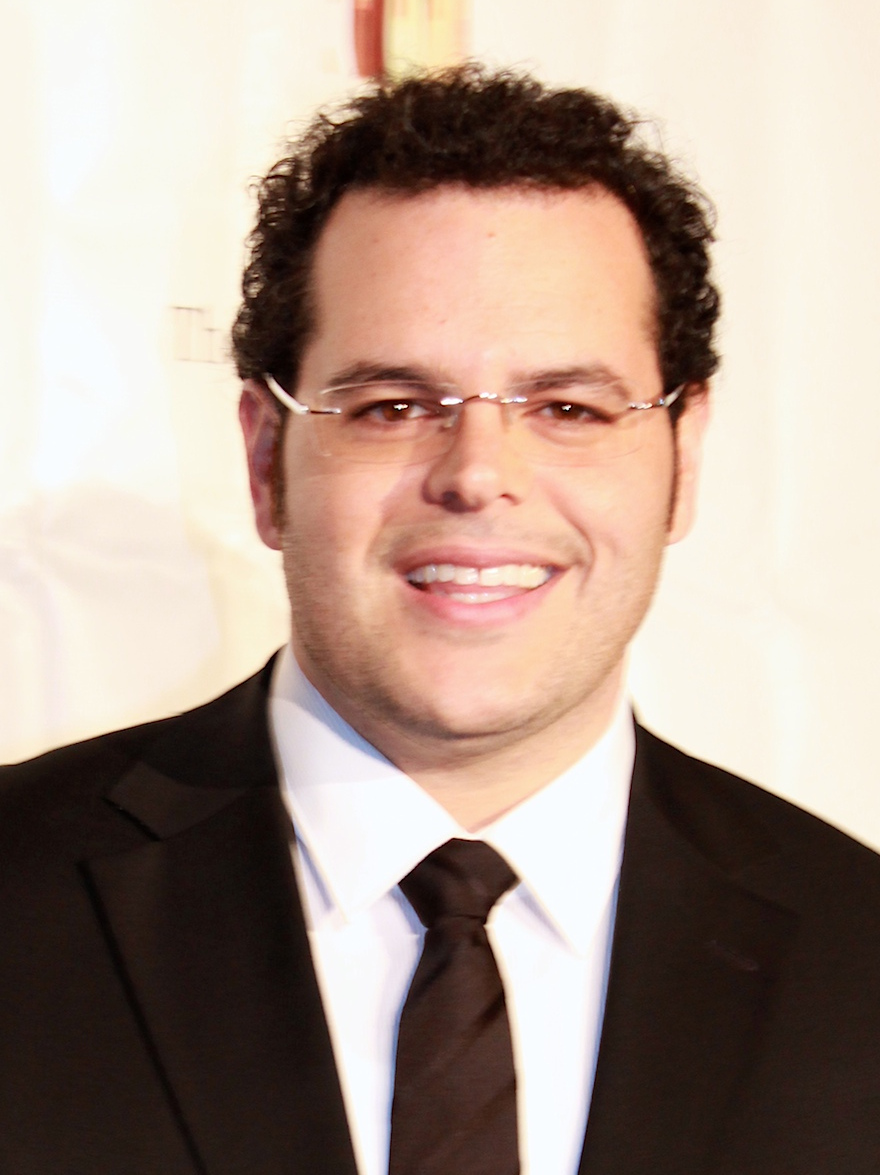
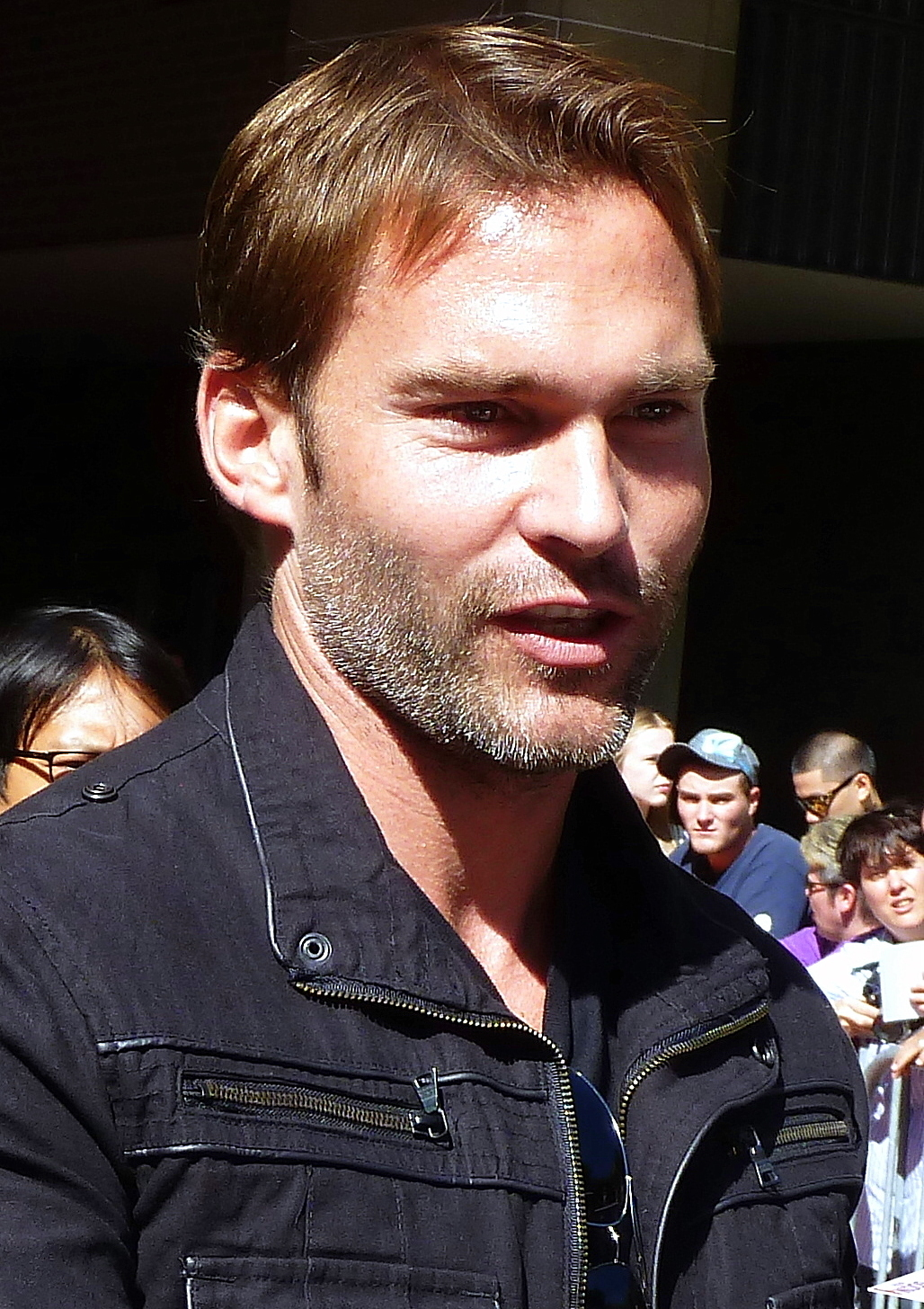
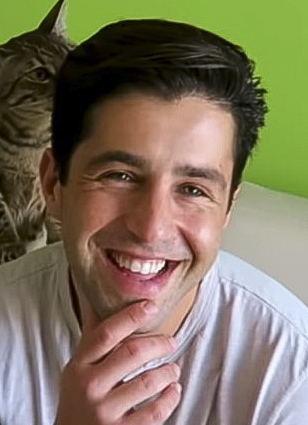
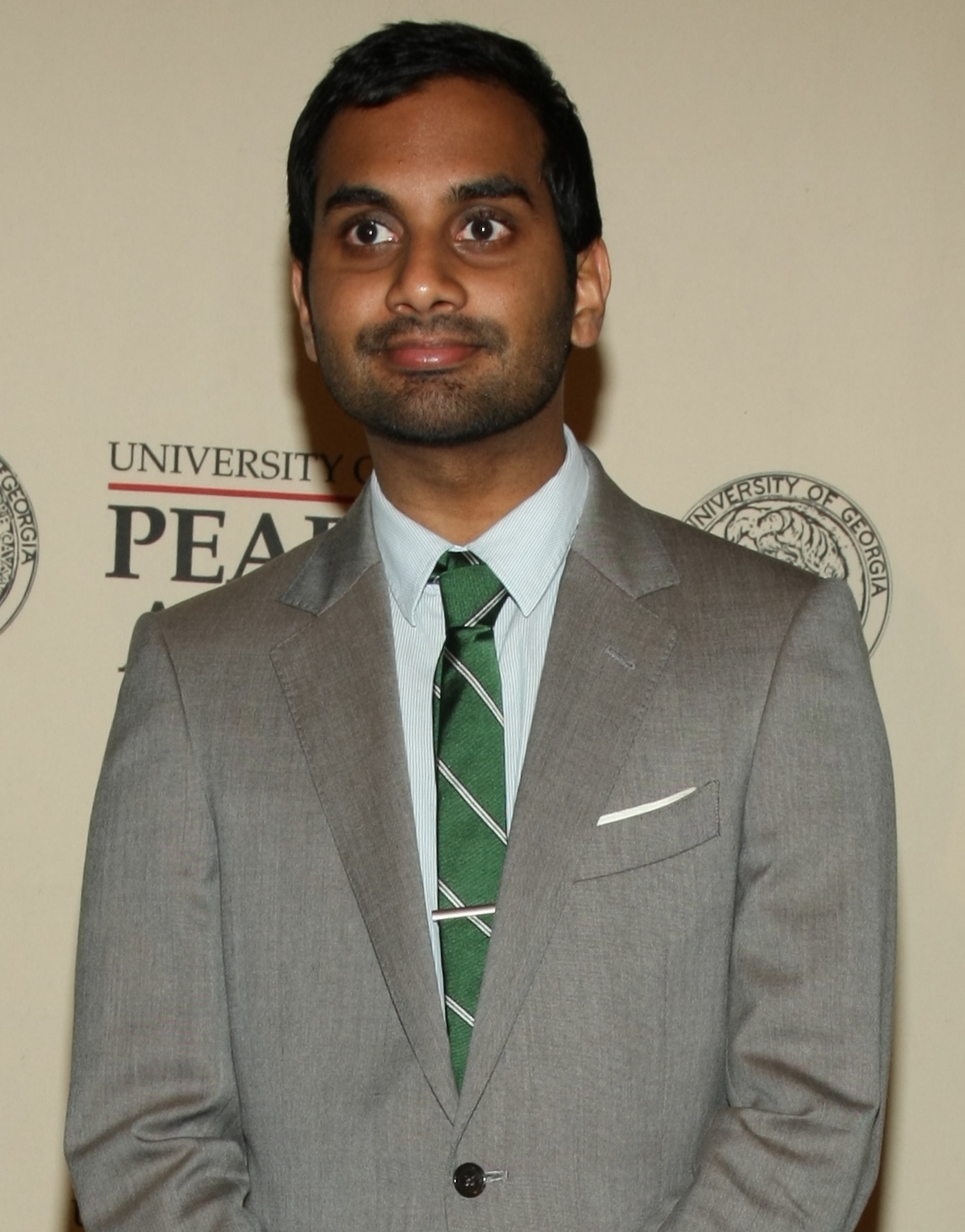
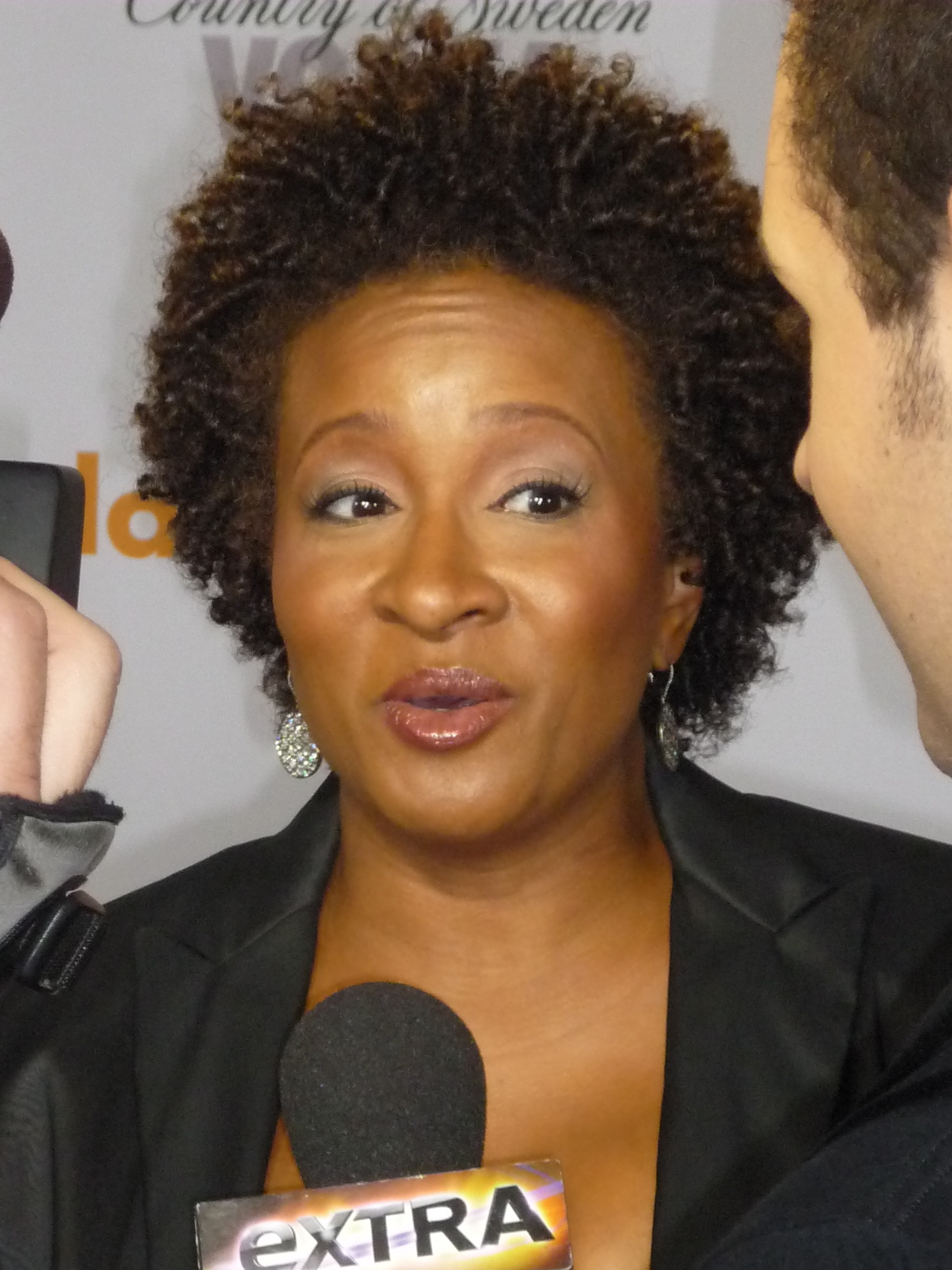
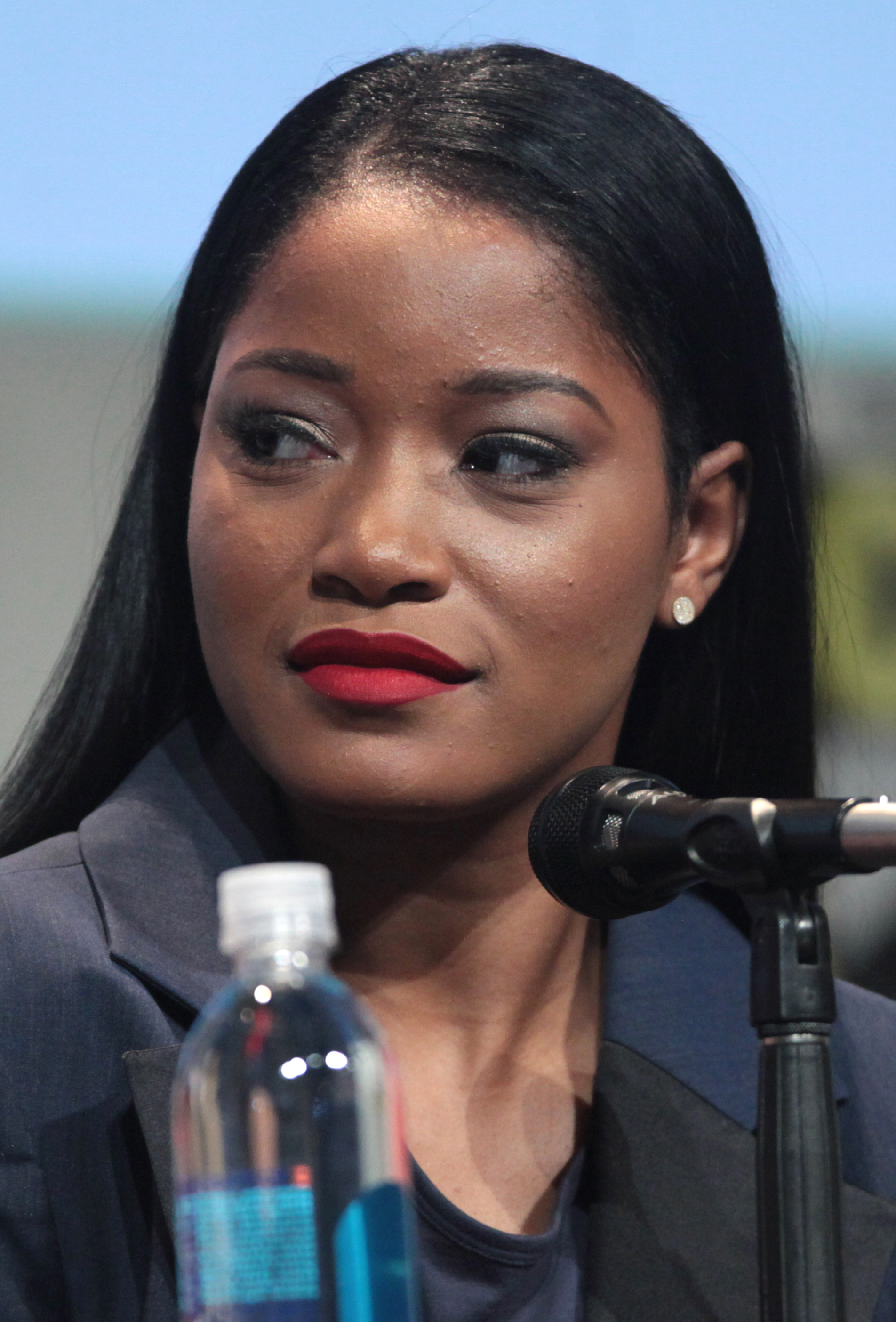
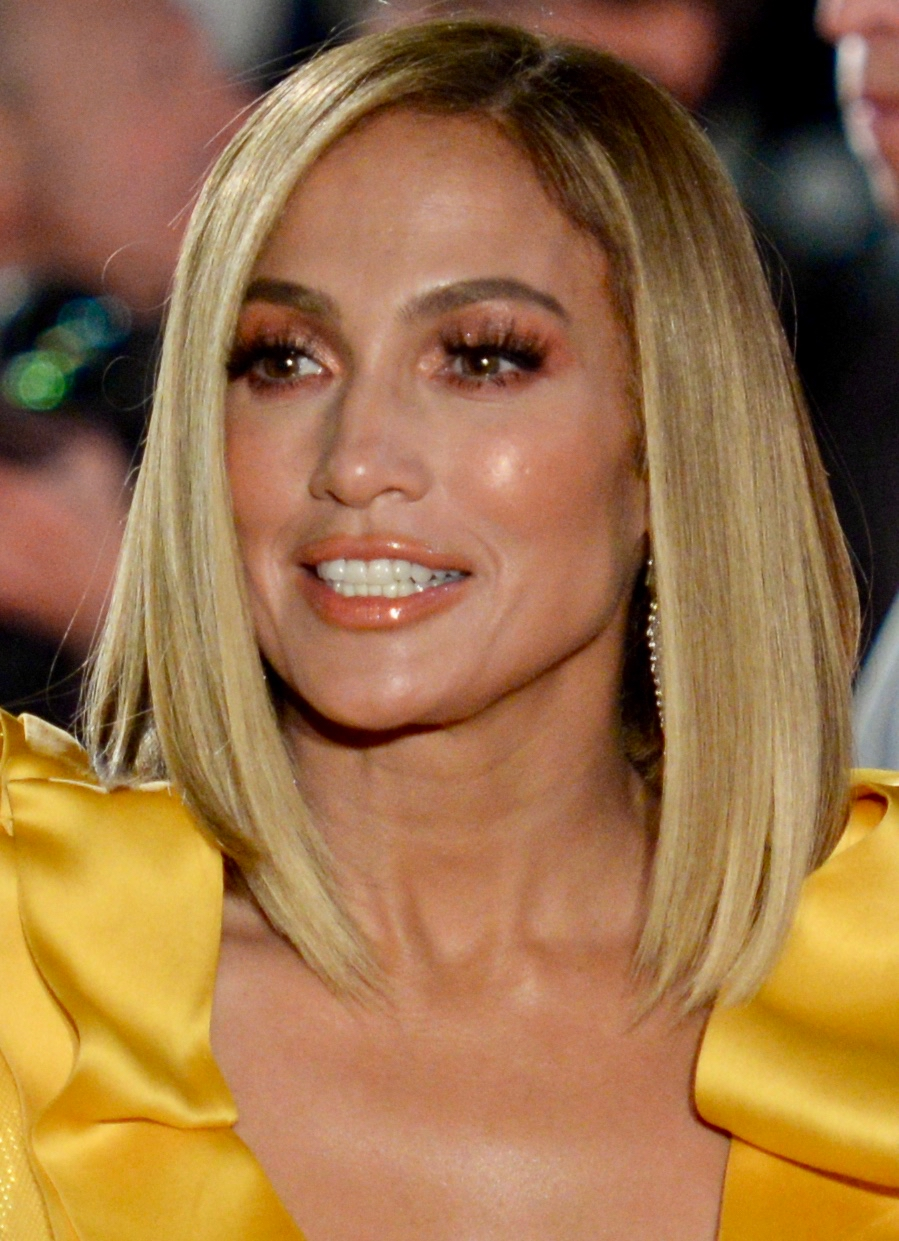
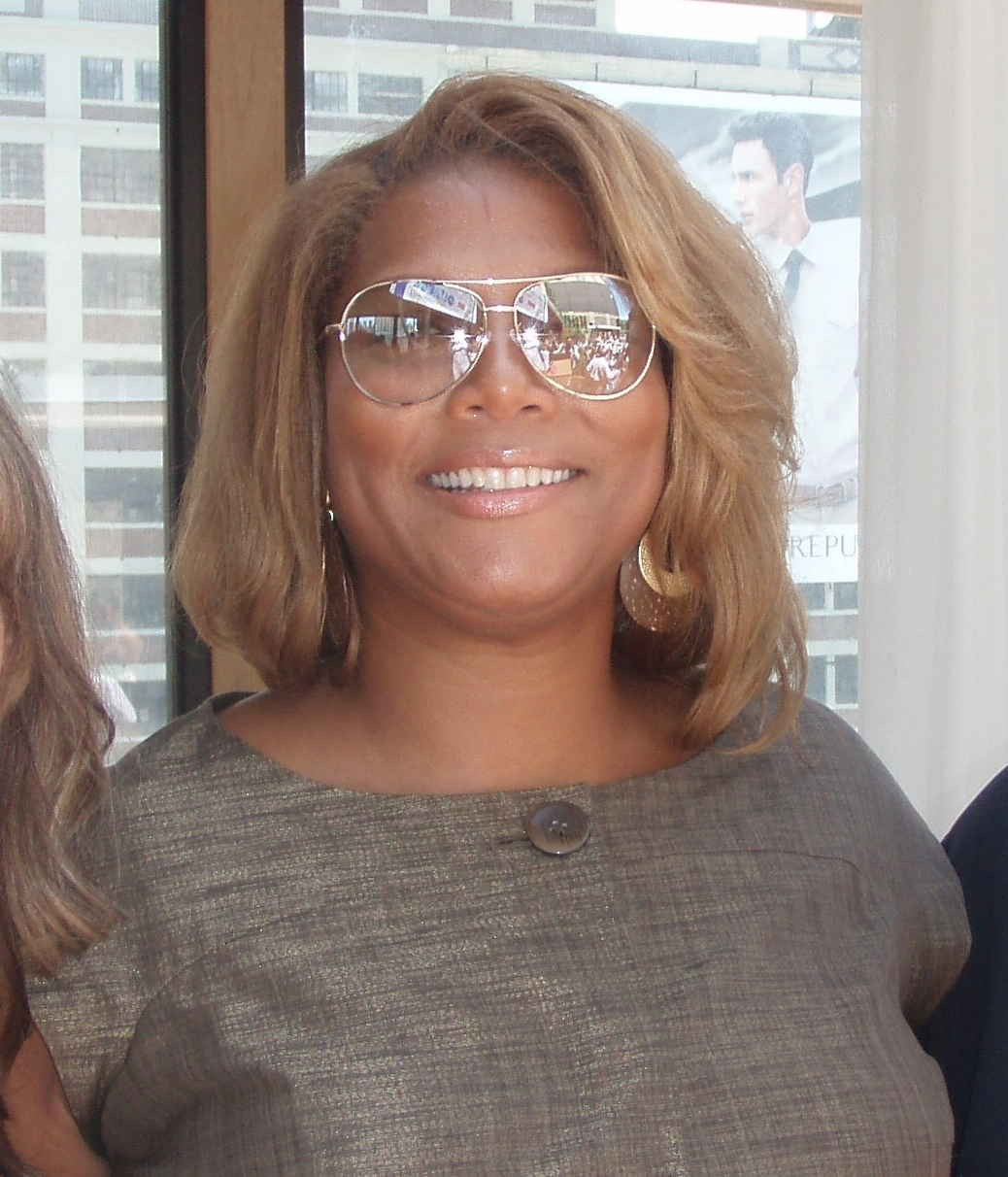
Top row: Ray Romano, John Leguizamo, Denis Leary and Peter Dinklage voice Manny, Sid, Diego and Captain Gutt.

Middle row: Josh Gad, Seann William Scott, Josh Peck and Aziz Ansari voice Louis, Crash, Eddie and Squint.

Bottom row: Wanda Sykes, Keke Palmer, Jennifer Lopez and Queen Latifah voice Granny, Peaches, Shira and Ellie.
- Keke Palmer as Peaches, a teenage woolly mammoth who is Louis' best friend and Manny & Ellie's daughter
- Ray Romano as Manny, a woolly mammoth who is Ellie's husband, Peaches' father and Sid and Diego's best friend
- Denis Leary as Diego, a Smilodon who is Manny and Sid's best friend and Shira's love interest
- John Leguizamo as Sid, a lazy, but caring ground sloth who is Manny and Diego's best friend
- Josh Gad as Louis, a molehog and Peaches' best friend who secretly has a crush on her.
- Peter Dinklage as Captain Gutt, a Gigantopithecus.
- Nicki Minaj as Steffie, a mammoth who is Ethan's girlfriend and makes fun of Peaches
- Drake as Ethan, a mammoth who is Steffie's boyfriend.
- Chris Wedge as Scrat, a cronopio
- Wanda Sykes as Gladys, Sid's aging grandmother
- Jennifer Lopez as Shira, a Smilodon and Gutt's first mate, until she is separated from her crew and falls in love with Diego
- Queen Latifah as Ellie, a woolly mammoth who is Manny's wife and Peaches' mother
- Aziz Ansari as Squint, a Palaeolagus.
- Nick Frost as Flynn, an English elephant seal
- Kunal Nayyar as Gupta, a Bengali badger
- Rebel Wilson as Raz, an Australian Procoptodon
- Alain Chabat as Silas, a French itchthyornis
- Seann William Scott and Josh Peck as Crash and Eddie, Ellie's adoptive Alphadon brothers
- Eddie "Piolín" Sotelo as Uncle Fungus, Sid's uncle
- Joy Behar as Eunice, Sid's mother
- Ben Gleib as Marshall, Sid's brother
- Alan Tudyk as:
  - Milton, Sid's father
  - A siren that attempts to deceive Granny
- Ester Dean as the sirens' feminine forms
- Karen Disher as a siren who takes on the form of Scratte, a female saber-toothed squirrel and an old flame of Scrat (Note: as depicted in Ice Age: Dawn of the Dinosaurs)
- Heather Morris as Katie, one of Steffie's best friends
- Patrick Stewart as Ariscratle, a saber-toothed squirrel from Scratlantis
- Simon Pegg as Buck, a one-eyed weasel who makes a brief cameo in the film's opening.

== Production ==
The first details of the sequel were announced on January 10, 2010, when The New York Times reported that Blue Sky was working on a fourth film and was in negotiations with the voice cast. Fox confirmed in May 2010, that Ice Age: Continental Drift would release on July 13, 2012.

=== Animation ===
For Continental Drift, one of the biggest challenges from Blue Sky's animation pipeline was the CG water used for the ocean and the clouds throughout the film. Unlike how it was handled from Ice Age: The Meltdown, the water effects from the ocean were achieved by using a combination of software, some developed in-house and some off-the-shelf. While water, splashes and cloud rendering was done in Blue Sky's proprietary renderer, Houdini was used to generate data for simulations and RealFlow for some splash effects. The biggest sequence for the CG water was mostly during the storm sequence, being the perfect scale to tackle in the film. For the clouds, the team built settings in a real space so they could be lit and rotated with dynamic camera movement through and around them.

== Music ==
A soundtrack album of music by John Powell, who previously composed the second and third installments, and was released on July 10, 2012, by Varèse Sarabande. In addition to Powell's original score, the film features Beethoven's 9th Symphony.

During the film's end credits, two songs played. "Chasing the Sun" by the Wanted, and "We Are (Family)" written by Ester Dean, performed by Keke Palmer and other cast members including Drake and Nicki Minaj. Both songs are not available on the soundtrack but the former was released previously on the band's 2012 debut EP, The Wanted; a solo version of "We Are (Family)" by Palmer is available for download.

The pirates additionally perform a sea shanty during the film featuring vocals from Peter Dinklage amongst other cast members, called "Master of the Seas", written and produced by Adam Schlesinger. This song is not featured on the soundtrack.

== Release ==
Ice Age: Continental Drift had its premiere on June 20, 2012, at the CineEurope film distributors' trade fair in Barcelona. It publicly premiered on June 27, 2012, in Belgium, Egypt, France, Switzerland, and Trinidad, and was released on July 13, 2012, in the United States by 20th Century Fox. The film was accompanied by the short animated film The Longest Daycare, featuring Maggie Simpson from the animated sitcom The Simpsons.

=== Marketing ===
As a promotion for Ice Age: Continental Drift, Fox released two 3-minute short segments from the film serving as teasers for it, titled Scrat's Continental Crack-up and Scrat's Continental Crack-up: Part 2. The first part premiered as a theatrical release attached to Gulliver's Travels in 2010, and later with Rio. It was also released online in January 2011, on iTunes Movie Trailers. The second part was released in November 2011, on iTunes, and debuted in theaters with Alvin and the Chipmunks: Chipwrecked. The first part shows how Scrat's actions lead to split of the continents, while in the second part, Scrat's underwater pursuit of acorns leads him to a pirate ship.

The film was featured on Tommy Baldwin Racing's No. 10 car driven by Tomy Drissi for the 2012 NASCAR Sprint Cup Series Toyota/Save Mart 350 held in June 2012.

=== Home media ===
Ice Age: Continental Drift was released on DVD, Blu-ray, and Blu-ray 3D on December 11, 2012.

== Reception ==
=== Box office ===
Ice Age: Continental Drift earned $161 million in North America and $716 million in other territories, for a worldwide total of $877 million. Its worldwide opening weekend totaled $126.9 million. As of 2019, worldwide it is the 66th-highest-grossing film of all time, the fifth-highest-grossing film of 2012 (also, the highest-grossing animated film of that year), and the second-highest-grossing film in the Ice Age series. Overall, it is the eighteenth-highest-grossing animated film of all time.

North America

In North America, the film earned $16.7 million on its opening day and $46.6 million on its opening weekend, which was the second highest debut in the Ice Age series, only behind The Meltdown ($68 million). The film closed from theaters on February 7, 2013, with $161.3 million, thus standing as the second-highest-grossing film in the series.

Other territories

Outside North America, it is the twelfth-highest-grossing film, the third-highest-grossing 2012 film and the second-highest-grossing film distributed by Fox. It set an all-time record among animated films, until Disney's Frozen surpassed it. Ice Age: Continental Drift had a two-day (Wednesday–Thursday) opening of $11 million from 12 markets. On its opening weekend (through Sunday), it earned first place with $80.3 million from 34 markets, opening No. 1 in all of them. The film set an opening-day record in Nicaragua and a Thursday-opening record in Guatemala. In Peru, it earned the second-highest-grossing opening day and the highest for an animated film.

It set opening-day records for an animated film in Russia and in Sweden and achieved the second-highest-grossing opening day for an animated film in France ($4.5 million), Colombia, Argentina, and Chile. The film set opening-weekend records for any film in Argentina (first surpassed by Iron Man 3), Colombia, Peru, Central America, and Chile, and opening-weekend records for an animated film in Norway, Sweden (surpassed by Frozen), Ecuador, and Bolivia. Its largest opening weekends were recorded in Russia and the CIS ($16.9 million), China ($15.7 million), and France and the Maghreb region ($12.8 million). It is the second-highest-grossing film in Latin America with at least $181 million, only behind Marvel's The Avengers.

=== Critical response ===
On Rotten Tomatoes, the film has an approval rating of 37% based on 132 reviews and an average rating of 5.1/10. The site's critical consensus reads, "Ice Age: Continental Drift 3D has moments of charm and witty slapstick, but it often seems content to recycle ideas from the previous films." On Metacritic, the film has a score of 49 out of 100 based on 29 critics, indicating "mixed or average" reviews. Audiences polled by CinemaScore gave the film an average grade of "A−" on an A+ to F scale.

Roger Ebert of the Chicago Sun-Times gave the film two stars out of four and stated, "Watching this film was a cheerless exercise for me. The characters are manic and idiotic, the dialogue is rat-a-tat chatter, the action is entirely at the service of the 3D, and the movie depends on bright colors, lots of noise and a few songs in between the whiplash moments." Megan Lehmann of The Hollywood Reporter said, "It's familiar, drawn-out shtick, and the humor lacks the subtlety of the first and best Ice Age, but there are some visually inventive high points."

Simon Brew, writing for Den of Geek, gave a very positive four-star review, saying that "not only is Ice Age 4 arguably the best in the franchise yet, it's also, a little surprisingly perhaps (given that it's a fourth movie in a franchise, turned around on a strict cycle), turned out to be thoroughly, thoroughly entertaining family blockbuster." Olly Richards of Empire, gave the film three out of five stars and wrote, "Old friends and new voice talent will delight kids with a never-ending love for the most undemanding animation out there. A megabucks franchise drifts on." Chris Tilly of IGN posted a score of 7/10, describing it as a "consistently funny and entertaining sequel" that suffers from a "predictable and preachy" teenage subplot but remains anchored by "striking and lush" 3D visuals and standout vocal performances.

A.O. Scott of The New York Times gave the film an unfavorable review, writing that while it is "too friendly to dislike" and offers an appealing "vision of interspecies multiculturalism," the sequel's sense of fun is essentially "parasitic," heavily overstaying its welcome with a "dreadful song" and characters who cannot "shut up for even a minute." Jaime N. Christley of Slant Magazine also panned the film, calling it an "87-minute timesuck" and a "relentless onslaught of sameness and stupidity" that caters strictly to a "remedial, Duplo Blocks demographic" while leaving parents "bored to distraction." MaryAnn Johanson of Flick Filosopher said that it "inspires me to one thing: to sincerely hope that Ice Age 5 is subtitled Mass Extinction," offering a very harsh review that pans the sequel as a "cheap and cheaty" time-waster that wallows in a "cesspool of sitcom caricature" while shamelessly derivative of better films. Mack Rawden of CinemaBlend gave it 2 stars out of 5, writing that while the plot "works fairly well as an adventure story" and showcases "vibrant" animation, the final product is ultimately "a disappointment" for older audiences. He noted that what the film lacks "are laughs and moments of joy," concluding that the writers failed to provide enough fresh humor to make the experience genuinely fun."

== Video game ==
Ice Age: Continental Drift – Arctic Games, a tie-in video game based on the film developed by Behaviour Interactive and published by Activision, was released in July 2012 for Wii, Nintendo 3DS, Nintendo DS, PlayStation 3, and Xbox 360.

== Legacy ==
=== Sequels ===
A sequel, titled Ice Age: Collision Course, was released on July 22, 2016, while a sixth film is in development and set to be released on February 5, 2027.

=== Alien: Earth connection ===
The film was used as a major plot point in the TV series Alien: Earth.

== See also ==
- List of animated feature-length films
- List of computer-animated films
