= Blue Sky Studios =

Former American visual effects and computer animation studio (1987–2021)

Blue Sky Studios, Inc.
- Final logo, used from 2013 to 2021

- Former headquarters in Greenwich, Connecticut
- Type: Subsidiary
- Industry: Visual effects; Computer animation; Motion pictures
- Predecessors: MAGI; Fox Animation Studios
- Founded: February 22, 1987; 39 years ago
- Founders: Chris Wedge; Carl Ludwig; Eugene Troubetzkoy; Alison Brown; David Brown; Michael Ferraro
- Defunct: April 10, 2021; 5 years ago
- Fate: Closed
- Successor: 20th Century Animation
- Headquarters: Greenwich American Center; Greenwich, Connecticut, US
- Key people: Robert Baird (co-president); Andrew Millstein (co-president); Brian Keane (COO)
- Products: Animated films; Animated shorts
- Number of employees: 450 (2021)
- Parent: VIFX (1997–1999); 20th Century Animation (1999–2021)
- Website: blueskystudios.com at the Wayback Machine (archived June 9, 2021) (now redirects to disney.com)

Blue Sky Studios, Inc. was an American visual effects and computer animation studio, which was based in Greenwich, Connecticut. It was founded on February 22, 1987 by Chris Wedge, Michael Ferraro, Carl Ludwig, Alison Brown, David Brown and Eugene Troubetzkoy after their employer, Mathematical Applications Group (MAGI), one of the visual effects studios behind Tron (1982), got sold to Vidmax Canada and eventually closed. Using its in-house rendering software, the studio created visual effects for commercials and films before dedicating itself to animated film production. It produced 13 feature films, the first being Ice Age (2002) and the final one being Spies in Disguise (2019).

Blue Sky Studios became a subsidiary of 20th Century Animation in 1997 through its VIFX division's majority-stake acquisition of the studio and became the principal animation studio of 20th Century Fox from 2002 until its acquisition by the Walt Disney Company, as part of their acquisition of 21st Century Fox assets in 2019. Disney closed down Blue Sky on 10 April 2021 and absorbed its library and IPs into 20th Century Animation.

Ice Age and Rio were the studio's most commercially successful franchises, while Robots (2005), Horton Hears a Who! (2008), The Peanuts Movie (2015), and the aforementioned Spies in Disguise were among its most critically praised films. Scrat, a character from the Ice Age franchise, was the studio's mascot.

== History ==
=== 1980–1989: Formation and early computer animation ===
In the late 1970s, Chris Wedge, then an undergraduate at Purchase College studying film, was employed by Mathematical Applications Group, Inc. (MAGI). MAGI was an early computer technology company that produced SynthaVision, a software application that could replicate the laws of physics to measure nuclear radiation rays for US government contracts. At MAGI, Wedge met Eugene Troubetzkoy, who held a Ph.D in theoretical physics and was one of the first computer animators. Using his background in character animation, Wedge helped MAGI produce animation for television commercials, which eventually led to an offer from Walt Disney Productions to produce animation for the film Tron (1982). After Tron, MAGI hired Carl Ludwig, an electrical engineer, and Mike Ferraro transferred to the film division from the Cad Cam division of MAGI. As MAGI's success began to decline, the company employed David Brown from CBS/Fox Video to be a marketing executive and Alison Brown to be a managing producer. After MAGI was sold to Vidmax Canada, the six individuals—Wedge, Troubetzkoy, Ferraro, Ludwig, David Brown and Alison Brown—founded Blue Sky Studios on February 22, 1987 to continue the software design and produce computer animation.

Logo used from 1987 to 2005

At Blue Sky, Ferraro and Ludwig expanded on CGI Studio, the studio programming language they started at MAGI and began using it for animation production. At the time, scanline renderers were prevalent in the computer graphics industry, and they required computer animators and digital artists to add lighting effects in manually; Troubetzkoy and Ludwig adapted MAGI's ray tracing, algorithms which simulate the physical properties of light in order to produce lighting effects automatically. To accomplish this, Ludwig examined how light passes through water, ice and crystal, and programmed those properties into the software. Following the stock market crash of 1987, Blue Sky Studios did not find their first client until about two years later: a company "that wanted their logo animated so it would be seen flying over the ocean in front of a sunset." In order to receive the commission, Blue Sky spent two days rendering a single frame and submitted it to the prospective client. However, once the client accepted their offer, Blue Sky found that they could not produce the entire animation in time without help from a local graphics studio, which provided them with extra computer processors.

=== 1989–2002: Visual effects, television commercials and Bunny ===
Throughout the late 1980s and 1990s, Blue Sky Studios concentrated on the production of television commercials and visual effects for film. The studio began by animating commercials that depicted the mechanisms of time-release capsules for pharmaceutical corporations. The studio also produced a Chock Full O' Nuts commercial with a talking coffee bean and developed the first computer-animated M&M's. Using CGI Studio, the studio produced over 200 other commercials for clients such as Chrysler, General Foods, Texaco, Pepsi and the United States Marines. They made a cartoon bumper for Nicktoons that features an orange blob making a dolphin, a dinosaur and a walking person.

In 1996, MTV Films collaborated with Blue Sky Studios on the film Joe's Apartment, for which Blue Sky animated the insect characters. Other clients included Bell Atlantic, Rayovac, Gillette and Braun. The Braun commercial was awarded a CLIO Award for Advertising. Recalling the award, Ludwig stated that the judges had initially mistaken the commercial as a live-action submission as a result of the photorealism of the computer-animated razor. In August 1997, 20th Century Fox's Los Angeles-based visual effects company, VIFX, acquired majority interest in Blue Sky Studios to form a new visual effects and animation company, renamed "Blue Sky/VIFX". Following the studio's expansion, Blue Sky produced character animation for the films Alien Resurrection (1997), A Simple Wish (1997), Mouse Hunt (1997), Star Trek: Insurrection (1998) and Fight Club (1999), as well as for The Sopranos episode "Funhouse".

Starting in 1990, Wedge had been working on a short film titled Bunny, intended to demonstrate CGI Studio. The film revolves around a rabbit widow who is irritated by a moth. The moth subsequently leads the rabbit into "a heavenly glow, reuniting her with her husband." At the time, Wedge had been the thesis advisor for Carlos Saldanha while Saldanha was a graduate student at the School of Visual Arts; Wedge shared storyboard panels for Bunny with Saldanha during this time. After Saldanha's graduation, Blue Sky Studios hired him as an animator, and he later directed a few commercials. It was not until 1996 when Nina Rappaport, a producer at Blue Sky Studios, assigned Wedge to complete the Bunny project, which required CGI Studio to render fur, glass and metal from multiple light sources, such as a swinging light bulb and an "ethereal cloudscape". In the initial stages of the Bunny project, Ludwig modified CGI Studio to simulate radiosity, which tracks light rays as they reflect off of multiple surfaces. Blue Sky Studios released Bunny in 1998, and it received the Academy Award for Best Animated Short Film. Bunny's success gave Blue Sky Studios the opportunity to produce feature-length films.

=== 2002–2019: Feature films under 20th Century Fox ===
Logo used from 2005 to 2013

In March 1999, Fox decided to sell VIFX to another visual effects and animation company, Rhythm & Hues Studios, while Blue Sky Studios would remain under Fox. According to Wedge, Fox considered selling Blue Sky as well by 2000 due to financial difficulties in the visual effects industry in general. Instead, Wedge, film producer Lori Forte, and animation executive Chris Meledandri presented Fox with a script for a comedy feature film titled Ice Age. Studio management pressured staff to sell their remaining shares and options to Fox on the promise of continued employment on feature-length films. The studio moved to White Plains, New York and started production on Ice Age. As the film wrapped, Fox feared that it might bomb at the box office. They terminated half of the production staff and tried unsuccessfully to find a buyer for the film and the studio. Instead, Ice Age was released by 20th Century Fox on March 15, 2002, and was a critical and commercial success, receiving a nomination for an Academy Award for Best Animated Feature at the 75th Academy Awards in 2003. The film established Blue Sky as the third studio, after Pixar and DreamWorks Animation, to launch a successful CGI franchise.

In January 2009, the studio moved from White Plains to Greenwich, Connecticut, taking advantage of the state's 30 percent tax credit and having more space to grow. In April 2017, the studio stated that it intended to stay in Connecticut until 2025.

In 2013, Wedge took a leave of absence to direct Paramount Animation's live-action/animated film Monster Trucks (2016). He then returned to Blue Sky Studios and worked on multiple projects for the company, such as serving as an executive producer.

=== 2019–2021: Disney acquisition and closure ===
Ownership of Blue Sky Studios was assumed by The Walt Disney Company as part of their acquisition of 21st Century Fox, which concluded on March 20, 2019. On March 21, Disney announced that Blue Sky Studios and its parent company 20th Century Fox Animation (now 20th Century Animation) would be integrated as units within the Walt Disney Studios with co-presidents Andrea Miloro and Robert Baird continuing to lead the studio, while reporting to Walt Disney Studios chairman Alan Horn. In July 2019, Miloro announced that she would be stepping down from her role as co-president, thus leaving Baird as sole president.

In August 2019, former Walt Disney Animation Studios head Andrew Millstein was named as co-president of Blue Sky Studios alongside Baird, while Pixar Animation Studios president Jim Morris also took a supervising role.

Spies in Disguise was released by 20th Century Fox on December 25, 2019. It ended up being the final feature film released under the Blue Sky name, and the only feature film produced by Blue Sky Studios that Disney released.

On February 9, 2021, Disney announced that Blue Sky Studios would close in April of that year. A spokesperson for the company explained that this was being done due to the economic situation of the moment. In addition, production on a film adaptation of the webcomic Nimona, originally scheduled to be released on January 14, 2022, was canceled as a result of its closure. The studio's film library and intellectual properties are retained by Disney through 20th Century Animation. Although Disney did not give an exact date as to when the studio would be closing down initially, former animator Rick Fournier confirmed on April 10 it was their last day of operation, three days after co-founder Chris Wedge released a farewell letter on social media.

As of June 19, 2021, Blue Sky Studios' website now redirects to Disney.com.

=== 2021–present: Post-closure ===
On May 4, 2021, fan site Disney Television Animation News reported that it was rumored that a short series produced by Blue Sky known as Scrat Tales would be coming to Disney+. The series would follow the titular Scrat, who discovers that he has a son. Footage of the series was later leaked onto YouTube, with former Blue Sky animators revealing that the series would be coming to Disney+ in 2022 after The Ice Age Adventures of Buck Wild. On February 22, 2022, Disney officially announced the series, with a release date for April 13, 2022.

A spin-off film in the Ice Age franchise, titled The Ice Age Adventures of Buck Wild, was produced by Walt Disney Pictures. The film was originally produced by 20th Century Studios and 20th Century Animation before being moved to Walt Disney Pictures during production for unknown reasons. It was animated by Canadian animation studio Bardel Entertainment and was released on Disney+ on January 28, 2022, to generally negative reviews from critics.

Additionally, in January 2022, a third film in the Rio franchise was revealed to be in development alongside a seventh installment in the Ice Age franchise, the later of which was later revealed to be Ice Age: Boiling Point.

Days after the release of The Ice Age Adventures of Buck Wild, it was reported that Disney had lost the rights of Scrat to fashion designer and artist Ivy Supersonic. She was said to have originally created Scrat under the name "Sqrat", pitched the character to Fox, and got turned down by the studio. Supersonic claims the studio's own documents actually identified the character in Ice Age as "Sqrat", though her creation was not saber-toothed. Supersonic was offered a $300,000 settlement by Fox, but she turned it down and subsequently lost in court. The case later went to appeal (Case # 04401 Court of Appeals, Second Circuit, NYC). Supersonic still had hopes of receiving damages for her claimed infringement, later winning a partial summary judgment from the Trademark Trial and Appeal Board in a reverse suit, Fox Entertainment Group and Twentieth Century Fox Film Corporation v. Ivy Silberstein (her real name), in which Fox had tried to prevent her from registering the trademark "SQRAT". Rumors originally circulated in 2020 that Disney lost the rights to the character following the trademark dispute and later circulated as Scrat was not featured in The Ice Age Adventures of Buck Wild. However, after the unveiling of Scrat Tales, it was revealed that Disney did not lose the rights to Scrat.

In March 2022, amid the controversy of Disney's involvement in Florida House Bill 1557, referred to by some as the Don't Say Gay bill, and lack of criticism from CEO Bob Chapek until after the bill had passed, Insider reported that three former Blue Sky staff members stated Nimona received pushback from Disney leadership in mid-2020, centered around the film's LGBT themes and a same-sex kiss. Initially, Blue Sky leadership removed the same-sex kiss from "presentations to Disney, despite hoping to ultimately include it in the film, the sources said. [...] Blue Sky leadership eventually showed reels to staffers that included the kiss, the sources said, but the studio was shut down soon after". Nimona was picked up by Annapurna Pictures on April 11, 2022, with DNEG Animation finishing production, for release on Netflix on June 30, 2023.

Ice Age: Scrat Tales, the last official Blue Sky production, was released as scheduled on April 13, 2022. The final episode of the series, "Nut The End", concluded its ending credits with a parting message from the company:

Scrat was the first character to appear in Blue Sky's first movie, "Ice Age".
Like him, we were reaching for something that might have been unattainable.
Yet time after time both we and Scrat have managed to
get our arms around versions of that elusive acorn.

Unfortunately, it's not possible to hold on to anything forever.

We've had more fun bringing our movies to life than anyone should be allowed.
We hope you've been able to feel some of that joy.

Thank you, from the bottom of our Blue Sky collective hearts,
for being with us all those years.

On the same day, a short video was uploaded to YouTube by an unlisted channel known as Finale, titled "The End", which featured Scrat finally capturing his acorn and eating it before scurrying away. The description revealed this was the final piece of animation made by Blue Sky Studios, done in their final days of operation by a small team of artists as "a farewell, a send-off, on our own terms."

== Filmography ==
Release timeline
2002	Ice Age
2003
2004
2005	Robots
2006	Ice Age: The Meltdown
2007
2008	Dr. Seuss' Horton Hears a Who!
2009	Ice Age: Dawn of the Dinosaurs
2010
2011	Rio
2012	Ice Age: Continental Drift
2013	Epic
2014	Rio 2
2015	The Peanuts Movie
2016	Ice Age: Collision Course
2017	Ferdinand
2018
2019	Spies in Disguise

No.	Title	Release date	Distributor/co-production with
1	Ice Age	March 15, 2002	20th Century Fox; 20th Century Fox Animation
2	Robots	March 11, 2005	20th Century Fox; 20th Century Fox Animation
3	Ice Age: The Meltdown	March 31, 2006	20th Century Fox; 20th Century Fox Animation
4	Dr. Seuss' Horton Hears a Who!	March 14, 2008	20th Century Fox; 20th Century Fox Animation
5	Ice Age: Dawn of the Dinosaurs	July 1, 2009	20th Century Fox; 20th Century Fox Animation
6	Rio	April 15, 2011	20th Century Fox; 20th Century Fox Animation
7	Ice Age: Continental Drift	July 13, 2012	20th Century Fox; 20th Century Fox Animation
8	Epic	May 24, 2013	20th Century Fox; 20th Century Fox Animation
9	Rio 2	April 11, 2014	20th Century Fox; 20th Century Fox Animation
10	The Peanuts Movie	November 6, 2015	20th Century Fox; 20th Century Fox Animation
11	Ice Age: Collision Course	July 22, 2016	20th Century Fox; 20th Century Fox Animation
12	Ferdinand	December 15, 2017	20th Century Fox; 20th Century Fox Animation; Davis Entertainment
13	Spies in Disguise	December 25, 2019	20th Century Fox; 20th Century Fox Animation; Chernin Entertainment

=== Franchises ===
Title	Films	Short films	TV seasons	Release dates
Ice Age	5	3	1	2002–2016
Rio	2	0	0	2011–2014

== See also ==
- 20th Century Animation
- Fox Animation Studios
- Walt Disney Animation Studios
- Pixar
- Disneytoon Studios
- List of 20th Century Studios theatrical animated feature films
- List of Disney theatrical animated feature films
