= Glimmer (She-Ra) =

Fictional animated television character

- Masters of the Universe character
- Glimmer as she first appears in the pilot episode of She-Ra and the Princesses of Power, "The Sword, Part 1".
- First appearance: The Secret of the Sword (1985)
- Created by: Larry DiTillio; Bob Forward
- Voiced by: Linda Gary (1985–87 series); Karen Fukuhara (2018–20 series)

In-universe information
- Species: Etherian
- Gender: Female
- Title: Princess
- Occupation: Great Rebellion leader
- Family: King Micah (father); Queen Angella (mother)
- Significant others: Bow (boyfriend, 2018 series)

Glimmer is a fictional character in the She-Ra animated television series, part of the Masters of the Universe franchise. Introduced in She-Ra: Princess of Power (1985–1987), she helps lead the Great Rebellion's efforts against the Horde. The daughter of King Micah and Queen Angella, Glimmer holds the title of Princess of Bright Moon in the series. In the original Princess of Power series, she is voiced by Linda Gary.

She later appears in the reboot series on Netflix, She-Ra and the Princesses of Power (2018–2020), voiced by Karen Fukuhara. Like in the original, Glimmer is the Princess of Bright Moon, which serves as the capital of her home planet, Etheria. In the fourth season of the reboot series, she ascends to become the Queen of Bright Moon.

== Development and design ==
=== Appearance and abilities ===
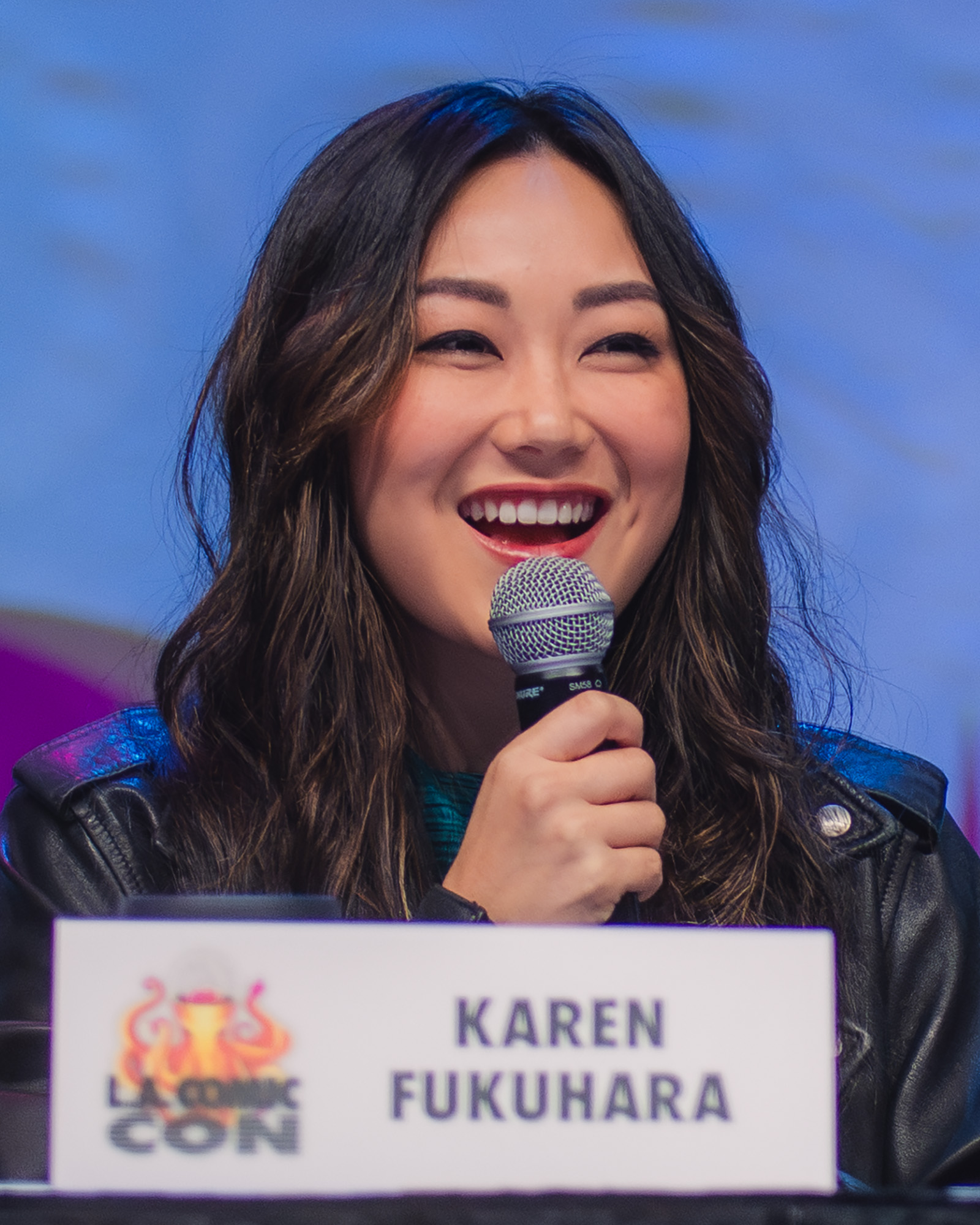
Karen Fukuhara voices Glimmer in the reboot series.

Glimmer is voiced by Linda Gary and Karen Fukuhara in the original and reboot series, respectively.

Her powers in the original series included teleportation, levitation, and invisibility. She was also able to turn night into day for brief periods. In the Princesses of Power, her connection to the Moonstone is inherited from her mother, while her more magical abilities are inherited from her father. She is able to emit energy blasts. Like in the original series, she is able to teleport, albeit in a limited capacity. ND Stevenson, creator of Princesses of Power, commented that his Dungeons & Dragons (D&D) character helped inspire the concept of Glimmer's limited teleportation. Stevenson also likened Glimmer to D&D's Sorcerer character class.

Glimmer was designed with a stocky build at the beginning of Princesses of Power. Fukuhara commented on Glimmer's appearance in the reboot compared to the original series, stating:

Glimmer in the old series has this perfect body and she looks beautiful and in our version she is beautiful and she is strong. It's definitely different from what we normally know as a princess, which I love and I also love that in our show we don't mention that. Because that is not the focus of the show, the focus is how powerful she can be, no matter what you look like.

There is a noticeable time skip that takes place between seasons three and four of the reboot series, which can be seen in Glimmer's "pronounced change in appearance". This included a change in her wardrobe, which features elements reminiscent of her mother's design. Discussing the change in Glimmer's appearance, showrunner ND Stevenson stated: "Glimmer was a character who read as the youngest in the first season, and that was her character arc [...] she was this rebellious princess who was sort of infantilized by her own mother, by the other members of the Rebellion, nobody really took her seriously." Stevenson elaborated that as part of Glimmer's arc for the fourth season, she would be placed in an uncomfortable and unexpected position of "trying to fill her mother's shoes".

=== Characterization ===
Glimmer was as "a stubborn and headstrong leader" by Den of Geek when the reboot first aired. At the beginning of the series, Glimmer struggles with maintaining independence from her mother. In the second season, Glimmer "struggles with being confined and constricted at times, within the Princess Alliance." Ahead of the fourth season's premiere, Stevenson stated that "Glimmer thinks that she can be this perfect queen who leads everybody in the right direction and protects everybody. We explore that."

Tracy Brown of the Los Angeles Times wrote that "For Glimmer, her struggle has always been with empathy. She's always been a little bit self-centered. She tends to focus on herself and her own goals and her own interiority, first and foremost, and is not always as sensitive to others' needs."

== Appearances ==
=== Princess of Power (1985–1987) ===
Dubbed the "Guide Who Lights the Way", Glimmer first appeared in the Filmation-produced animated television series, She-Ra: Princess of Power. The daughter of King Micah and Queen Angella of Bright Moon, she hold the title of Princess of Bright Moon in the series. She would lose her father to the Horde and her mother to Hunga the Harpy. Growing up without her parents, she became the leader of the Great Rebellion as a teenager. She-Ra (the alter ego of Adora), sister of He-Man, joined the Rebellion. At one point in Princess of Power, Glimmer became frustrated with Adora and unsuccessfully attempted to lead her own Rebel army. She was also noted to have strong feelings for Bow and an attraction for He-Man's alter ego, Prince Adam.

=== Princesses of Power (2018–2020) ===
Glimmer again appears in She-Ra and the Princesses of Power, a DreamWorks-produced reboot distributed by Netflix. Like the original series, she is the Princess of Bright Moon, which serves as the homebase of the Rebellion and capital of Etheria. She and her mother are connected to the Moonstone, the runestone in Bright Moon.

Glimmer as she most recently appears in the series finale, "Heart Part 2".

Compared to her "[naïve] and innocent" depiction in the original series, Glimmer is more "headstrong and feisty". Glimmer debuts in the reboot's two-part pilot, where she and Bow capture Adora, and subsequently show initial difficulty trusting her. Serving as Commander of the Rebellion, she confronts Adora's notion of the Horde, criticizing her role in their destruction of Etheria. Ultimately, the trio initiate a "Princess Alliance" and recruit Etheria's other princesses into the Rebellion against the Horde. During the series' third season, Adora is captured by Catra and Scorpia, and taken to the Fright Zone. Wanting to strengthen her powers so she can save Adora, Glimmer seeks out Shadow Weaver's help. Queen Angella sacrifices herself in the process, a traumatic event in Glimmer's character arc.

Later, in the fourth season of Princesses of Power, Glimmer ascends to throne and becomes the Queen of Bright Moon. As such, she assumes position as the leader of the Rebellion. Having to oversee Bright Moon directly, she struggles with having to stay behind while Adora and Bow go out on missions. Having her frustrations boil over in arguments with the two, a rift between Glimmer and her friends arises. Scorpia defects from the Horde and arrives in Bright Moon requesting help in saving Entrapta from Beast Island. Glimmer shut down the idea of a rescue mission, ordering Adora and Bow to stay in Bright Moon. The two go against her wishes and sneak out en route to Beast Island. Enraged with their decision, Glimmer seeks out Light Hope and inquires about the Heart of Etheria, a weapon that can only be activated if all princesses are connected to their runestones. Glimmer then teleports with Scorpia to the Fright Zone to help her connect to her runestone. While the Heart of Etheria is activated online, Adora destroys its ability to fire. Glimmer, along with Catra and Hordak are then captured by Horde Prime's fleet.

Held prisoner of Horde Prime, Glimmer reluctantly reveals to him the secret of the Heart of Etheria to prevent Adora from being overwhelmed and killed by Horde forces, but she refuses to give Prime She-Ra. During which, Glimmer forms a tentative bond with the doubt-ridden Catra, while expressing regret over her poor decisions and interactions with her friends. This is enough to redeem Catra, who helps Glimmer escape via a teleporter, and reunite with Adora and Bow, with whom she reconciles. Eventually, Glimmer follows Adora and the others in a missing to rescue Catra. Glimmer and Bow watch amazed as Adora resurfaces back as She-Ra, and a rescued Catra is healed.

=== Other media ===
As Mattel has distributed various Masters of the Universe toy lines, they have released several Glimmer figures since her introduction in She-Ra. Part of the 2014 Masters of the Universe Classics line, her figure included her staff and moonstone from the original series.

Glimmer has also appeared in mini comics, books, audio plays, and magazines. In a 1986 British comic magazine series, Glimmer's powers are channeled through her Staff of Light.

== Reception ==
Rebekah Krum of CBR commented that Glimmer "makes an endearing princess and an impressive queen." Also writing for CBR, Angie Dahl praised Glimmer's "realistic body type", relatable emotional struggles, and the imagery of her powers. On the latter, Dahl wrote that Glimmer is "adorable and fierce", showing that "girls and boys need not be limited to one type of strength." Conversely, CBR's John Witiw was critical of Glimmer, writing that "while she can be bold, she could also be too impulsive and incompetent with her powers." Witiw also criticized her dynamic with Bow, citing Glimmer's possessiveness as making their relationship "painful to watch at times."

Kelcie Mattson of Collider praised Glimmer's character development, stating she had "one heck of a satisfying character arc", but acknowledged that Glimmer's "actions in the latter seasons of She-Ra and the Princesses of Power earned her a bad rap among the fanbase."

Commenting on Glimmer's visual redesign, Megan Kirby of The A.V. Club wrote: "Princess Glimmer started with a stocky, wide-hipped build—and some fans were upset when traumas (and a character redesign) slimmed her down."
