= List of She-Ra and the Princesses of Power episodes =

She-Ra and the Princesses of Power is an American animated streaming television series developed by ND Stevenson and produced by DreamWorks Animation Television. A reboot of the 1985 Filmation series She-Ra: Princess of Power, the 2018 series tells the tale of a teenager named Adora, who gains powers that allow her to turn into the titular heroine. Emboldened with this power, Adora leads a group of other magical princesses in an alliance to defeat the evil Hordak and his Horde. The series was first streamed by Netflix, with its first season debuting on November 13, 2018. The series' fifth and final season was released on May 15, 2020. During the course of the series, 52 episodes of She-Ra and the Princesses of Power were released over five seasons.

== Series overview ==
Season	Episodes	Originally released
1	13	November 13, 2018
2	7	April 26, 2019
3	6	August 2, 2019
4	13	November 5, 2019
5	13	May 15, 2020

== Episodes ==
=== Season 1 (2018) ===
No. overall	No. in season	Title	Directed by	Written by	Storyboarded by	Original release date
1	1	"The Sword"	Adam Henry	ND Stevenson	Jen Bennett, Diana Huh, Polly Guo, & Joseph Scott	November 13, 2018
2	2	"The Sword"	Jen Bennett	ND Stevenson	Polly Guo, Mickey Quinn, Diana Huh, Joseph Scott, & Stephanie Stine	November 13, 2018
Adora, a teenage cadet who lives a sheltered life in the Fright Zone, is promoted to force captain of the Horde, an (evil) army led by Lord Hordak that rules most of the planet Etheria. To cheer up her best friend Catra, who is not to be permitted to participate in an upcoming attack on Thaymor, Adora sneaks away with Catra to the Whispering Woods. After accidentally crashing their ship in the woods, Adora finds a mysterious sword and begins having visions upon touching it. She is found by Catra, and they return to the Fright Zone. Haunted by dreams about the sword, Adora returns to the Whispering Woods later that night to find it. While there, Adora encounters Bow and Princess Glimmer, members of the Rebellion, the army opposing the Horde. Glimmer and Bow fight with Adora to acquire the sword. When a giant spider creature appears, Adora grabs the sword and transforms into a large warrior princess. Adora manages to calm the monster, but when she reverts to her usual form and Glimmer takes the sword, it attacks again. Glimmer, Bow, and Adora escape into a ruin of the ancient but technologically advanced First Ones. In the ruin, Adora finds that she can read the First Ones' forgotten language, and sees the name "She-Ra" under the image of a figure resembling her transformed state. Glimmer accidentally activates the ruin's lockdown, forcing them to escape. The three of them wander into the village of Thaymor, where Adora learns what a party is. Adora gradually befriends Glimmer and Bow while learning the truth about the Horde and their destructive war, and finally accepts the truth when the Horde attacks Thaymor. Catra is among the attack party, with orders from their superior and abusive guardian Shadow Weaver to retrieve Adora. When Catra admits to knowing all along what the Horde truly was, Adora refuses to return with her. Catra attempts to subdue Adora with an electric baton. Adora transforms into She-Ra and drives off the Horde from Thaymor. Hoping to join the rebellion, Adora leaves with Bow and Glimmer for Bright Moon, the rebel capital.
3	3	"Razz"	Stephanie Stine	Story by : James Krieg & ND Stevenson; Teleplay by : ND Stevenson	Diana Huh, Angela Kim, & Joseph Scott	November 13, 2018
Glimmer hopes to introduce She-Ra to her mother Queen Angella, but Adora is unable to intentionally transform. One of her attempts to transform result in a horse being transformed into a talking winged unicorn named Swift Wind. She is then chased out of Bright Moon by rebels recognizing her attire as a Horde uniform. Back in the Whispering Woods, Adora meets the eccentric Madame Razz, who takes Adora to the First Ones' Beacon to pick berries, while giving her cryptic advice and addressing her as Mara. After hearing Razz's advice, Adora becomes determined to fight back against the Horde. When the transformed Swift Wind is captured by Horde soldiers, Adora is able to transform to rescue him. Later, Adora appears before Angella and convinces the queen to allow her to join the rebellion. Meanwhile in the Fright Zone, Hordak promotes Catra to the position of force captain in Adora's absence.
4	4	"Flowers for She-Ra"	Lianne Hughes	Josie Campbell	Marc Camelbeke & Mandy Clotworthy	November 13, 2018
The kingdom of Plumeria, ruled by Princess Perfuma, is under siege from the Horde. Glimmer hopes to reassemble the Princess Alliance her parents once had with the other kingdoms before her father's death, and so she, Bow, and Adora travel there as part of a relief effort. Perfuma and her people are pacifists who have done nothing to resist the Horde; when they meet She-Ra, they assume she will be able to solve all their problems. After unsuccessfully attempting to heal their dying plant life, Adora admits to not being able to heal like the She-Ra in the legends. Adora leads an attack on the Horde's camp, and convinces the Plumerians to fight back against the invading army. Shadow Weaver, having recently learned She-Ra's true identity, acts against Hordak's orders by ordering Catra to find Adora and sends shadows to magically spy on her.
5	5	"The Sea Gate"	Jen Bennett	Sonja Warfield	Polly Guo & Mickey Quinn	November 13, 2018
Traveling to the kingdom of Salineas to convince Princess Mermista to join the Princess Alliance, Adora and her friends garner the services of Captain Sea Hawk by defeating him in an arm-wrestling match. In Salineas, Sea Hawk awkwardly tries to rekindle a former relationship with Mermista. Shadow Weaver sends Catra with fellow force captain Scorpia along with a crew to retrieve Adora. Catra and the other Horde soldiers attack the Salineas Sea Gate, which prevents Horde attacks on the kingdom. With the Sea Gate failing, She-Ra repairs the mystical barrier while her friends and new allies drive off the Horde forces.
6	6	"System Failure"	Stephanie Stine	Katherine Nolfi	Diana Huh, Angela Kim & Sam Szymanski	November 13, 2018
Adora and her friends travel to the Kingdom of Dryl to convince Princess Entrapta, an engineer, to join the princess alliance. They find themselves fighting for their lives, as Entrapta's experiments with the First Ones' technology unleashed a virus that caused her robots to turn violent. Adora herself is affected by the virus, since her sword is a form of First Ones technology. Glimmer and Entrapta keep Adora safe while they try to find a cure. Meanwhile, Bow, who has been separated from the group, leads the castle's staff in finding his friends. When Bow reunites with Glimmer and Adora, they raid the room in which the virus seems to have taken hold. With the help of Glimmer, Entrapta, and the castle's staff, Bow shoots a sonic arrow at the virus. The virus's effects are nullified, as the robots are pacified and Adora is cured.
7	7	"In the Shadows of Mystacor"	Lianne Hughes	Rich Burns	Marc Camelbeke, Mandy Clotworthy, Angela Kim & Faryn Pearl	November 13, 2018
Glimmer takes Adora to the hidden sorcerers' kingdom of Mystacor, guarded by her aunt, Castaspella. Adora is unable to relax, convinced that Shadow Weaver is in the kingdom, although everyone tells her that is impossible. As a ceremony to renew Mystacor's magical barrier draws near, Shadow Weaver enacts a plan to use one of her shadow spies to disrupt the ritual while isolating Adora for capture. She-Ra successfully foils both plans.
8	8	"Princess Prom"	Jen Bennett	Josie Campbell	Jasmine Goggins, Polly Guo, Kiki Manrique & Mickey Quinn	November 13, 2018
Adora receives an honorary invitation to the Princess Prom, an event that occurs once a decade, being hosted by Princess Frosta in the Kingdom of Snows. Adora, trying to understand the rules and formulate a strategy, learns that weapons are not permitted at the event. Glimmer, fearing she and Bow are growing apart, is dismayed to learn that Bow is attending the prom with Perfuma. Meanwhile, Catra decides to formulate her own scheme to capture Adora and accompanies Scorpia (who is technically a princess) to the Princess Prom. At the prom, Adora makes a bad first impression on the much younger Frosta, and her continued suggestions that Catra is up to no good only lead to her being reprimanded for harassing other guests. Catra and other Horde members bomb Frosta's castle as a diversion to steal Adora's sword, and kidnap Glimmer and Bow in the process.
9	9	"No Princess Left Behind"	Stephanie Stine	Sonja Warfield	Angela Kim, Diana Huh & Sam Szymanski	November 13, 2018
Shadow Weaver, taking credit for Catra's accomplishment, holds Glimmer hostage to force Angella to surrender herself. Adora enlists the help of Perfuma, Entrapta, Mermista, and Sea Hawk to infiltrate the Fright Zone to save Glimmer and Bow. Adora's plan goes horribly wrong and she gets captured, while Entrapta is seemingly killed when the others escape with Bow. Shadow Weaver tries to use her magic to alter Adora's memories to restore her previous mindset, but Glimmer frees herself and knocks out Shadow Weaver before freeing her friend. The two then attempt an escape but encounter Catra carrying Adora's sword. Catra returns Adora's sword to her and allows them to flee the Fright Zone.
10	10	"The Beacon"	Lianne Hughes	Katherine Nolfi	Marc Camelbeke, Mandy Clotworthy, Diana Huh, Angela Kim & Sam Szymanski	November 13, 2018
Following the events of their rescue mission, Adora blames herself for Entrapta's death. Mermista and Perfuma leave the alliance while Frosta closes off her kingdom from the outside world. Glimmer's magic power begins "glitching", which she tries to conceal from Angella. Glimmer and Angella finally come to an understanding that Angella cannot protect Glimmer by holding her back. Adora leaves to find the Beacon to try to help cure Glimmer. Meanwhile, Hordak scolds Shadow Weaver for acting against his orders and hiding the fact that Adora is She-Ra from him. Catra and Scorpia find Entrapta hiding in the air vents, alive and well. Catra wins Entrapta over to the Horde by claiming the others abandoned her and allowing her to use the Horde's resources for her research. Entrapta tells Catra that there is a large stash of First Ones technology under the Whispering Woods, and Catra ends up following Adora to the Beacon.
11	11	"Promise"	Jen Bennett	ND Stevenson	Polly Guo & Mickey Quinn	November 13, 2018
Adora enters the Beacon in her quest to heal Glimmer, but is frustrated by the holographic AI system's inability to give her useful information. She requests to speak with Light Hope, the woman she saw when she first touched the Sword of Protection. But Catra has followed her inside the Beacon, and when Catra steals a data crystal, she sets off the Beacon's alarm system. Adora and Catra flee the Beacon's defenses while being subjected to hologram projections of their past memories as kids in the Horde. In particular, they relive a promise of perpetual mutual protection they made to each other. Seeing how Adora apparently broke the promise by leaving her and the Horde makes Catra realize her own ambitions. She admits she does not want Adora to return to the Horde, and she leaves Adora hanging from a ledge. After hearing Light Hope telling her to let go, Adora lets herself fall into the abyss.
12	12	"Light Hope"	Lianne Hughes	Josie Campbell	Marc Camelbeke, Mandy Clotworthy & Angela Kim	November 13, 2018
After letting go, Adora finds herself in the Crystal Castle and meets Light Hope, who reveals the history of the First Ones and the legacy of She-Ra. Light Hope tries to communicate to Adora that she is the defender of all Etheria, attempting to convince her to remain with her in order to harness her full potential. However, Glimmer and Bow free their friend with the assistance of Swift Wind. Meanwhile, Entrapta learns more about the First Ones by decrypting a data crystal and discovering the First Ones' technology is integrated into the planet of Etheria itself, with the princesses' runestones as a means to tap into it. Hordak allows Catra to utilize Shadow Weaver's Black Garnet runestone. Infuriated, Shadow Weaver retaliates by attempting to subdue Catra, Scorpia, and Entrapta. After Shadow Weaver immobilizes Scorpia and Entrapta, Catra damages Shadow Weaver's mask, disrupting her powers, before finally subduing her. Entrapta's experiments on the Black Garnet runestone cause an imbalance on Etheria, which freezes over the Whispering Woods, leaving Bright Moon exposed to an attack by the Horde.
13	13	"The Battle of Bright Moon"	Stephanie Stine	ND Stevenson	Diana Huh, Jasmine Goggins, Angela Kim, Sharon Sun & Sam Szymanski	November 13, 2018
Catra leads an invasion force on Bright Moon to destroy the Moonstone and strengthen the Black Garnet's hold on Etheria. Angella keeps her runestone safe while She-Ra, Glimmer, and Bow lead the defense. Catra's forces seem to have the advantage due to Entrapta's technological improvements; after She-Ra loses her sword while fighting, Catra leads her away from the battle. However, Glimmer's connection to the moonstone is restored when Frosta, Perfuma, Mermista, and Sea Hawk arrive to turn the tide of battle, and She-Ra regains the sword and restores the balance of the runestones. Despite her failure, Catra has earned enough of Hordak's praise that she replaces Shadow Weaver as his new second-in-command.

=== Season 2 (2019) ===
No. overall	No. in season	Title	Directed by	Written by	Storyboarded by	Original release date
14	1	"The Frozen Forest"	Jen Bennett	Katherine Nolfi	Jasmine Goggins, Angela Kim, Kiki Monrique & Mickey Quinn	April 26, 2019
Despite their common cause, the Princess Alliance members face internal dispute while attempting to restore the Whispering Woods, as Catra deploys platoons of robots to prevent them. Bow suggests capturing an intact Horde-Bot to install a kill-switch program which could take all the Bots out, while Entrapta develops an advanced type of Horde-Bot utilizing First Ones technology. Adora and her companions are unable to defeat Entrapta's prototypes, and retreat to salvage more technology from the Beacon. Adora re-encourages her companions; they succeed in working together in destroying the Horde-Bots, and their inspiration triggers a magical force in them which revives the damaged woods. But while taking the remaining Bot apart, Bow discovers that Entrapta is still alive and working for the enemy.
15	2	"Ties That Bind"	Stephanie Stine & DWooman	Laura Sreebny	Karen Guo, Diana Huh, Angela Kim & Sam Szymanski	April 26, 2019
The Horde has taken Dryl, Entrapta's home. Light Hope informs Adora that she and her mount Swift Wind must form a special connection with each other, and asks Adora to seek out the ruins of the Watchtower, a First Ones relay station destroyed by the first She-Ra, whose restoration would improve her technical functions. Adora and Swift Wind discover the ruins, but Swift Wind's excited prattling makes it hard for Adora to ask for his assistance until they find a common understanding and thus establish their bond. Upon learning that Entrapta is still alive, Glimmer decides to mount a rescue mission with Bow, but they end up capturing Catra instead. On the way to Bright Moon, Catra upsets her captors by telling them that Entrapta is being tortured, and exhausts Glimmer's powers with uncooperative antics before activating her tracking beacon for Scorpia to find her. Catra then bluffs Glimmer and Bow into releasing her and reveals that Entrapta is helping the Horde willingly.
16	3	"Signals"	Lianne Hughes	Katherine Nolfi	Mandy Clotworthy & Olivier Malric	April 26, 2019
Catra faces Hordak's growing displeasure about her performance, driving her to seek the imprisoned Shadow Weaver's aid. In her search for a tool she needs, Entrapta sneaks into Hordak's laboratory and witnesses him conducting a failing experiment to create an interdimensional portal. She impulsively decides to perfect the process before being discovered. To Hordak's surprise, the next activation succeeds and he accepts Entrapta's offer to assist him. In the meantime, Adora, Glimmer, Bow and Swift Wind investigate the loss of communication with Alwyn, a farming outpost for the Rebellion. There, they meet several ghostly apparitions which Bow eventually identifies as holographic recordings of the First Ones, which are produced by an ancient communication device which has self-activated. Adora shuts off the device, ending the holograms; but this also activates the transmission of a message from a lost shipwreck.
17	4	"Roll With It"	Jen Bennett	Josie Campbell	Jasmine Goggins, Angela Kim & Mickey Quinn	April 26, 2019
The Rebels prepare to retake a Horde-controlled fortress controlling an important passage, but the operation gets stuck in its planning stage when Adora, Glimmer, Bow and the other Princesses begin arguing about strategy, each proposing an outlandish or self-aggrandizing plan of attack. Adora fears the prospect of having to fight Catra and is angered and frustrated by the others not taking the planning seriously. Meanwhile, Scorpia, who commands the fortress's defense, hopes to do a good job in order to impress Catra. Adora is encouraged to trust her friends to watch her back as they proceed to take the fortress despite Scorpia's precautions.
18	5	"White Out"	Lianne Hughes	Laura Sreebny	Steve Cooper, Charlemagne Co & Mandy Clotworthy	April 26, 2019
Catra, Entrapta, and Scorpia are sent to the frozen wastes to excavate First Ones technology, pursued by Adora, Glimmer, Bow, and Sea Hawk. Having learned of the First Ones' virus disc which Entrapta restored, Catra uses it to infect Adora with the intent of making her a tool for the Horde. Giant worm robots created by the First Ones to guard the site are also infected and attack the excavation camp, forcing the two groups to work together despite Catra's refusal to allow the disc to be destroyed. Scorpia ultimately destroys the disc, restoring Adora and the worms to normal. Catra's group escapes with some First Ones technology.
19	6	"Light Spinner"	DWooman	Katherine Nolfi	Trey Buongiorno, Diana Huh, Angela Kim & Sam Szymanski	April 26, 2019
Hordak decides to send Shadow Weaver to Beast Island to prevent her knowledge from becoming useful to the Rebels, much to the dismay of Catra, who still feels for Shadow Weaver despite her mistreatment of her childhood. In her cell, Shadow Weaver reminisces about her past as Light Spinner, mentoring the young apprentice Micah, until her pursuit of dark magic to end the war corrupted her and led her to join the Horde. In the present, Shadow Weaver tricks Catra into aiding her escape. In the meantime, Bow is able to decipher the message Adora activated in "Signals", which concerns Mara (the previous She-Ra), the name Serinia, and a portal.
20	7	"Reunion"	Jen Bennett	Josie Campbell	Jasmine Goggins, Mickey Quinn & Jessica Zammit	April 26, 2019
Trying to find out what the mysterious message means, Bow leaves Bright Moon to seek out information in the library of his fathers George and Lance. Adora and Glimmer follow him, and find out that Bow defied his fathers' wishes for him to be an academic like them, and instead became a freedom fighter without telling them. Following the accidental activation of a First Ones robot in George and Lance's collection, Adora transforms into She-Ra, which blows Bow's cover story. Bow pacifies the robot, and after witnessing his dedication and learning the truth, his fathers give him their approval. George and Lance subsequently decode the message as referring to a star constellation bearing the name Serinia which will soon appear above the Crimson Waste. In the Fright Zone, Catra desperately tries to track down the fugitive Shadow Weaver, but Hordak finds out about the escape and punishes Catra. The same night, Shadow Weaver appears in Bright Moon at Adora's bedside.

=== Season 3 (2019) ===
No. overall	No. in season	Title	Directed by	Written by	Storyboarded by	Original release date
21	1	"The Price of Power"	Steve Cooper	Shane Lynch	Mandy Clotworthy, Gus Corrales, Olivier Malric & Charlemagne Co	August 2, 2019
Near death, Shadow Weaver collapses in Adora's room and is captured. Adora sneaks into Shadow Weaver's cell and uses her powers to heal her. Shadow Weaver tells Adora that Hordak's plan is to open an interdimensional portal to bring the rest of the Horde armies to Etheria for total conquest. She also reveals that Adora came from another world as an infant through an experimental portal. Confused, Adora seeks out Light Hope, who confirms Shadow Weaver's tale and reveals Adora to be a First One. To find answers, Adora decides to follow Mara's message to the Crimson Waste, accompanied by Glimmer and Bow. In the Fright Zone, Catra faces public punishment by Hordak. Entrapta, having located a vital component for the portal in the Crimson Waste, speaks on Catra's behalf, and so Hordak assigns her to retrieve the component—or die trying.
22	2	"Huntara"	David Woo	Laura Sreebny	Diana Huh, Angela Kim & Sam Szymanski	August 2, 2019
Entrapta learns that Hordak is a defective clone of Horde Prime who was accidentally teleported to Etheria and conquered it to show Horde Prime his worth. Entrapta improves Hordak's life-sustaining armor, thus gaining his respect. In the Crimson Waste, Adora, Glimmer, and Bow stumble upon a tavern for outlaws, where they meet Huntara and hire her as a guide. However, Huntara leads them into a trap and steals Adora's sword. The three friends track Huntara down and recover the sword. When she learns that Adora is She-Ra, Huntara reveals that she too is a deserter from the Horde, disillusioned by their evil actions. She joins Adora's group and leads them to their destination: the wreckage of Mara's ship.
23	3	"Once Upon a Time in the Waste"	Jen Bennett	Josie Campbell	Jasmine Goggins, Mickey Quinn & Jessica Zammit	August 2, 2019
Arriving in the Crimson Waste, Catra and Scorpia learn of Adora's presence and take up pursuit, but are ambushed by Tung Lashor. Catra defeats him and takes control of his gang. While exploring the ship, Adora's group finds a holographic recording of Mara's last moments. The message reveals that Mara used the sword's power to draw Etheria into another dimension to hide it, and warns Adora not to create another portal. Just as the message ends, Catra and her army arrive and capture Adora, although Huntara escapes with Bow and Glimmer. Seeing Catra genuinely happy, Scorpia proposes that they forsake the Horde to stay and rule the Crimson Waste together. Questioning Adora, Catra learns that Shadow Weaver is still alive in Bright Moon, which prompts Catra to decide to return to the Fright Zone and go along with Hordak's plan.
24	4	"Moment of Truth"	DWooman	Katherine Nolfi	Angela Kim and Sam Szymanski	August 2, 2019
Catra returns with Adora to the Fright Zone and presents the sword as the key needed to open Hordak's portal. Glimmer, Bow, and Huntara return to Bright Moon, but cannot persuade Angella to help, so Glimmer seeks Shadow Weaver's assistance. Shadow Weaver helps improve Glimmer's powers so she can teleport them, Bow, and the other princesses right into Hordak's base, but they are soon discovered and forced to fight their way through. In the meantime, Entrapta discovers that opening the portal would annihilate reality, but Catra, obsessed with vengeance, knocks her out and exiles her to Beast Island, threatening Scorpia with the same fate when she protests. She lies to Hordak that Entrapta is a traitor and hides the danger of the portal, and the portal is activated.
25	5	"Remember"	Mandy Clotworthy	ND Stevenson	Charlemagne Co, Steve Cooper & Olivier Malric	August 2, 2019
Adora awakens in the Fright Zone, living the life she would have if she never defected from the Horde, in a seemingly "perfect world". As she goes on with her life, several peculiar happenings and strange memory flashes quickly begin to tell her that something is seriously amiss. Scorpia also realizes something is wrong and tries to help Adora, but disappears into thin air. As Adora's realization grows, the false reality begins to disintegrate. Adora flees with Catra to the Whispering Woods, but when Catra regains her memories, she willingly lets go of their friendship and attacks Adora instead of trying to rectify the catastrophe. Evading her, Adora then meets Madame Razz, who tells her that Mara had triggered such a cataclysm before when she displaced Etheria, and gives Adora the advice to "go back to the beginning". As she leaves to seek out Glimmer and Bow, she is followed by Catra, half-mutated by the reality warp.
26	6	"The Portal"	Jen Bennett	Josie Campbell	Jasmine Goggins, Mickey Quinn & Jessica Zammit	August 2, 2019
Adora arrives at the "perfect world" version of Bright Moon, where King Micah is still alive, and is taken prisoner. Her curiosity piqued by the new arrival, Glimmer drags Bow into questioning Adora, who manages to revive their memories of the real world. The three seek out Entrapta, who has determined that Adora must remove the sword from the portal to close it, but will be trapped within the portal forever if she does so. As reality collapses further and her friends disappear, Adora is confronted by Catra, but manages to overcome her former friend and her doubts. Queen Angella sacrifices herself to remove the sword. With true reality thus restored, Hordak and Catra escape while Adora's group returns to Bright Moon; but the interdimensional disruption has enabled Horde Prime to track Hordak down.

=== Season 4 (2019) ===
No. overall	No. in season	Title	Directed by	Written by	Storyboarded by	Original release date
27	1	"The Coronation"	Dwooman, Diana Huh, and Kiki Manrique	Laura Sreebny	Angela Kim, Sharon Sun, and Sam Szymanski	November 5, 2019
Adora, Bow, and the other princesses gather for the coronation of Glimmer as the new Queen of Bright Moon. However, Glimmer is still grieving for her mother Angella and is upset at the festive atmosphere and the attention being lavished on her. A key coronation ritual involves traveling into a magical cave below Bright Moon. During the quest, Glimmer, Adora, and Bow encounter a large slug, which attacks them. However, Glimmer is able to calm the giant slug down by coming to terms with her mother's loss and embracing her powers. Meanwhile, Hordak blames Catra for the recent debacle involving the portal. Scorpia wants to retrieve Entrapta from Beast Island, but Catra perpetuates the lie that Entrapta sabotaged the portal. Later, Catra forces Hordak to agree to her plans to end the Rebellion by removing his armor's crystal.
28	2	"The Valley of the Lost"	Mandy Clotworthy	Katherine Nolfi	Charlemagne Co, Olivier Malric, Belynda Smith, and David Smith	November 5, 2019
Glimmer sends Adora, Bow, Huntara and Perfuma to the Crimson Waste to retrieve Mara's ship, only to discover that the Horde have already salvaged it. During their attempts to reclaim it, Huntara discovers how her home has been taken over and perverted by the Horde, and Perfuma struggles to adapt to the desert's plant life. Catra meets Double Trouble, a shapeshifting mercenary offering their services for a price. As proof of their abilities, Double Trouble masquerades as Catra and engages Adora when she and the others attack for Mara's ship. The ruse is convincing, and Adora is none the wiser, convincing Catra to hire Double Trouble. Huntara decides to remain in the Crimson Waste in order to reclaim her home.
29	3	"Flutterina"	Jen Bennett	M. Willis	Jasmine Goggins, Mickey Quinn, and Jessica Zammit	November 5, 2019
Catra struggles with her guilt in betraying Adora and framing Entrapta. Following a series of Horde setbacks, Catra introduces Double Trouble to Hordak. After saving the village of Elberon, Adora, Bow and Swift Wind stay to enjoy a celebration in their honor. Glimmer laments that she is unable to join and fight alongside them like she used to, now that she is Queen. When Adora is lured away, the Horde attack and take the village captive. With help from a young Elberon girl named Flutterina, Adora is able to save Bow and the villagers. Afterwards, they welcome Flutterina into the Rebellion, unaware that she is actually Double Trouble.
30	4	"Pulse"	Kiki Manrique	Laura Sreebny	Diana Huh, Angela Kim, Sharon Sun, and Sam Szymanski	November 5, 2019
The Rebellion struggles to deal a significant blow against the Horde's forces, as every transport they attack is empty. When a new robot capable of emitting a powerful destructive pulse injures Bow, Adora vows to destroy it to avenge her friend, with the help of Netossa and Spinnerella. Glimmer, meanwhile, turns to Shadow Weaver for advice on how to stop the Horde and manages to use a locator spell to reveal a secret outpost in the Whispering Woods. Glimmer travels there alone and battles Catra, destroying the Horde's additional robots. However, Adora is not happy about Glimmer learning magic from Shadow Weaver, causing some friction in their friendship.
31	5	"Protocol"	Mandy Clotworthy	Katherine Nolfi	Charlemagne Co, Olivier Malric, and Belynda Smith	November 5, 2019
While training, Adora tries to get further answers from Light Hope, who remains vague and dodges her questions. When she tries to leave, Light Hope stops her due to a dangerous acid spore storm enveloping the Woods. The storm causes Light Hope to shut down and attempt a reboot. Before her memory is fully loaded, Light Hope acts far more cheerful and friendly. Though she isn't able to get the answers to her questions, Adora does witness a memory of friendship between Mara and Light Hope. At the same time, Adora and Catra's former Horde teammates Kyle, Lonnie, and Rogelio are stuck in the Whispering Wood, and one of them must brave the spores to repair their transport. Kyle, fed up and feeling that there is no loyalty or friendship between them, goes to repair their transport. He collapses, and Lonnie and Rogelio rescue him before returning to the Fright Zone. Afterwards, once Light Hope is fully rebooted, she reviews her memory of Mara and coldly deletes it.
32	6	"Princess Scorpia"	Kiki Manrique	Laura Sreebny	Diana Huh, Angela Kim, Sharon Sun, and Sam Szymanski	November 5, 2019
In order to complete his project, Hordak requires Entrapta's notes, which Catra orders Scorpia to find. Scorpia reflects on how her family surrendered their kingdom to the Horde. When Scorpia finds out the recordings are inside Entrapta's robot Emily, whom Scorpia had been taking care of in Entrapta's absence, and that they cannot be removed without destroying Emily, she is torn between her friendship and care for Emily and her desire to be a good friend to Catra. Later, she offers a damaged recording chip to Catra, claiming that she destroyed Emily to retrieve it, but Catra erupts in fury at Scorpia's failure. Scorpia tells Catra she is a bad friend, finally giving up on Catra before leaving with Emily, hoping to rescue Entrapta from Beast Island. Meanwhile, Flutterina manipulates the members of the Rebellion and drives a wedge between Adora and Glimmer.
33	7	"Mer-Mysteries"	Jen Bennett	M. Willis	Jasmine Goggins, Mickey Quinn, Sharon Sun, and Jessica Zammit	November 5, 2019
After a failed attempt to retake Dryl, the Rebellion concludes there is a spy in their midst giving information to the Horde. After interviewing several suspects and sorting out everyone's accounts of the events, the Princesses begin arguing with each other. However, this is only an elaborate ruse to trap the spy, and they succeed in taking Double Trouble prisoner. However, Double Trouble reveals that the whole ordeal served to distract the Princesses from Hordak's attack on Mermista's kingdom, which he has successfully conquered.
34	8	"Boys' Night Out"	Kiki Manqrique	Shane Lynch	Diana Huh, Angela Kim, Alex Kwan, Sharon Sun, and Sam Szymanski	November 5, 2019
Mermista wallows in the loss of her kingdom, while Catra discovers that Scorpia has left her and the Horde behind. Sea Hawk takes Bow and Swift Wind on a Boys' Night Out, but ends up getting them captured by the Horde in a foolish attempt to cheer the Princesses up with a rescue mission. Mermista discovers this and is able to rescue them, improving her spirits. However, Adora and Glimmer's friendship becomes more strained.
35	9	"Hero"	Mandy Clotworthy	Josie Campbell and ND Stevenson	Charlemagne Co, Olivier Malric, and Belynda Smith	November 5, 2019
Adora visits Razz for some answers about Mara, but Razz confuses the present with the past and Mara with Adora. In the past, Razz first met Mara after she arrived to study the magic of Etheria for a secret project called the Heart of Etheria. During her time there, Mara learned to harness magic herself, but also discovered the grave true nature of the Heart of Etheria Project and sacrificed her life to stop it. Razz leads Adora to Mara's recovered ship, where Mara had recorded a message for Adora at Razz's suggestion in the past. Mara explains that the Heart of Etheria is a weapon that has been siphoning magic from Etheria and storing it in the core. She was able to stop it from going off and tearing Etheria apart, and chose to hide Etheria in Despondos so that the weapon could never be used on anyone. She implores Adora not to trust Light Hope, who had been reprogrammed by the First Ones to activate the Heart at any cost.
36	10	"Fractures"	Jen Bennett	Katherine Nolfi	Brendan Clogher, Jasmine Goggins, Mickey Quinn, and Jessica Zammit	November 5, 2019
The revelation about the Heart of Etheria divides the Rebellion. Adora and Bow are against using it, knowing that doing so will destroy the planet just as Mara warned. Glimmer, however, wants to harness the magic in order to finally defeat the Horde. Scorpia arrives and asks the Princesses for help in rescuing Entrapta from Beast Island, but Glimmer refuses, not wanting to waste time on a rescue mission while they are still fighting the Horde. In response, Adora and Bow disobey her orders and sneak out to rescue Entrapta, while Scorpia ends up bonding with and feeling welcomed by the Princesses for the first time in her life.
37	11	"Beast Island"	Mandy Clotworthy	M. Willis	Charlemagne Co, Ivaylo Ivantchev, Sasha Mutch, and Belynda Smith	November 5, 2019
Using Mara's ship, Adora, Bow and Swift Wind arrive on Beast Island. Adora is unable to transform into She-Ra. While searching for Entrapta and avoiding the numerous dangers, they discover that Glimmer's father, King Micah, is alive and well on the island, exiled there by the Horde. They encounter prehensile vines and a signal that fills them with doubt and depression, but Adora remembers Queen Angella's final words and regains her resolve and transformation. As they face savage creatures, Entrapta appears and rescues them. Angered by Adora and Bow's disobeying of her decree, Glimmer travels to the Crystal Castle to speak with Light Hope about the Heart of Etheria. Light Hope explains that it can only be activated once the planet is balanced, and the only thing left is to reconnect the Black Garnet with its intended princess: Scorpia.
38	12	"Destiny"	Jen Bennett	Katherine Nolfi and Laura Sreebny	Kelsey Eng, Jasmine Goggins, Mickey Quinn, and Jessica Zammit	November 5, 2019
39	13	"Destiny"	Kiki Manrique	Katherine Nolfi and Laura Sreebny	Diana Huh, Emily Hu, Angela Kim, Sharon Sun, and Sam Szymanski	November 5, 2019
Entrapta reveals that Beast Island was a dumping facility for the First Ones' information and explains to Adora what the Heart of Etheria is. When it is activated, the magical energy in the core will forcibly go into She-Ra, the only being powerful enough to contain it, before being fired through the Sword of Protection. They escape Beast Island and return to Bright Moon before Adora races to the Crystal Castle to stop the weapon. Double Trouble, having switched sides to the Rebellion for their own survival, assists Glimmer in getting into the Fright Zone with Scorpia. Later, Double Trouble reveals to Hordak that Catra had lied to him and sent Entrapta to Beast Island. Angered and fed up with Catra's abusive behavior, Kyle, Lonnie, and Rogelio decide to flee the Horde. Hordak attacks Catra for deceiving him, but Catra is able to get the upper hand and subdue him. With Glimmer's encouragement, Scorpia connects with the Black Garnet, activating her latent electric powers. With this, Light Hope activates the Heart of Etheria while Adora arrives at the Crystal Castle to stop her. Despite Adora's efforts to refuse, Light Hope forces her to proceed, and returns Etheria to its original dimension. Adora tries to break through to Light Hope, who glitches between her original and reprogrammed self, lamenting that she is not as strong as Mara. Adora manages to use the gathered magic within her to shatter the Sword of Protection, thus stopping the weapon. Light Hope thanks Adora and fades away, Horde Prime's fleet arrives at Etheria, and Hordak, Glimmer, and Catra are taken to his ship. Horde Prime has Hordak taken away to be "reconditioned" as punishment for trying to start an empire of his own, while Catra convinces him to spare Etheria by informing him of the superweapon within it. Despite no longer being able to transform into She-Ra, Adora remains determined to fight.

=== Season 5 (2020) ===
No. overall	No. in season	Title	Directed by	Written by	Storyboarded by	Original release date
40	1	"Horde Prime"	Mandy Clotworthy	M. Willis	Charlemagne Co, Sasha Mutch, and Belynda Smith	May 15, 2020
As the rebels try to reorganize and mount a mission to rescue Glimmer, Adora becomes reckless, often attacking Horde forces all on her own. She is also plagued by recurring visions in which she faces a glowing vision of She-Ra. Catra persuades Horde Prime to take her into his service. Over dinner, Horde Prime shows Catra and Glimmer that his forces have discovered and overwhelmed the rebel camp. Seeing Adora about to be killed, Glimmer reveals the secret of the Heart of Etheria. Saved by her friends, Adora is reminded that she is not alone in this fight; together they flee to a hidden grove in the Whispering Woods.
41	2	"Launch"	Jen Bennett	Laura Sreebny	Chuckles Austen, Brendan Clogher, Jasmine Goggins, Mickey Quinn, Sharon Sun, and Sam Szymanski	May 15, 2020
Horde Prime attempts to taunt Glimmer into giving him She-Ra; Glimmer refuses to do so, and begins to form a tentative bond with the doubt-ridden Catra. With Adora exhausted, the other princesses attempt to track the position of Horde Prime's flagship in space, but Entrapta's carelessness raises the alarm. With Mermista taking charge, the princesses succeed in getting the information they need, but also learn that Prime is sending more troops to Etheria. Adora finds a new sense of purpose in her bond with her friends even without her She-Ra powers. While the others stay behind to cover their escape, Adora, Bow and Entrapta leave Etheria in Mara's ship, headed for Prime's flagship.
42	3	"Corridors"	Kiki Manrique	Katherine Nolfi	Diana Huh, Anissa Espinosa, Angela Kim, Sharon Sun, and Jessica Zammit	May 15, 2020
During their trip, Adora's ship malfunctions, temporarily stranding the team in space. As Catra ventures through the Horde ship, she encounters a clone and recognizes him as the reconditioned Hordak. Having discovered her interaction with Glimmer, Horde Prime intimidates her into compliance, and after questioning Glimmer, Catra tells Prime about Adora's rescue mission. However, her memories of her childhood friendship with Adora finally inspire Catra to free Glimmer and send her to Adora via teleporter before she is captured. Informed by Catra, Adora and Bow successfully retrieve Glimmer from the void of space.
43	4	"Stranded"	Mandy Clotworthy	M. Willis	Charlemagne Co, Sasha Mutch, and Belynda Smith	May 15, 2020
On their way back to Etheria, Adora's ship runs out of fuel, forcing the group to land on a nearby seismically unstable planet where they can find the fuel crystals they need. Meanwhile, the reunion between Glimmer and Bow is strained; he is still angry that she attempted to activate the Heart of Etheria. Falling into a cave rift, Adora encounters three fugitives from Horde Prime's empire—Starla, Tallstar and Jewelstar—who are also looking for fuel crystals. The two groups team up to find the fuel before the planet is destroyed by its seismic disruptions. When the cave is about to collapse, Adora's determination to save her friends causes her to briefly transform into She-Ra, inspiring the Star Siblings to join the rebellion. Their adventure restores Bow's trust in Glimmer, and together they decide to save Catra from Horde Prime's clutches.
44	5	"Save the Cat"	Jen Bennett	ND Stevenson	Brendan Clogher, Morgan Hillebrand, Jasmine Goggins, Mickey Quinn, and Sharon Sun	May 15, 2020
Adora's team returns to Horde Prime's flagship, and while Adora surrenders herself as a ruse, Glimmer, Bow and Entrapta infiltrate the vessel to retrieve Catra and strategic information. Bow and Entrapta end up severing one of Prime's clones from his hivemind connection, thus gaining an ally, whom Entrapta nicknames "Wrong Hordak". Adora faces Horde Prime and demands Catra's release, only to learn that Catra has been enslaved by Prime's hivemind through a chip embedded in her neck. He uses Catra as leverage to make Adora become She-Ra so he can make use of the Heart of Etheria, but when Glimmer destroys the ship's main computer, Catra recovers her consciousness, whereupon Prime mortally injures her. Adora's grief over Catra causes her to transform into She-Ra, enabling her to fight her way back to her friends and heal Catra. Back on the ship, Hordak recovers the First Ones crystal Entrapta gifted to him, rekindling his subconscious memories of her.
45	6	"Taking Control"	Mandy Clotworthy	Laura Sreebny	Charlemagne Co, Sasha Mutch, and Belynda Smith	May 15, 2020
Adora tries to reconnect with Catra, but her former friend's stubbornness and feelings of guilt put a barrier between them. With their ship heavily damaged and under pursuit by the Horde, they try to hide in an asteroid field, but their pursuers locate them through a tracer signal emitted by Catra's control chip. Back on Etheria, Micah, Swift Wind, Frosta, Netossa, and Spinnerella receive a distress call from the village of Elberon; but when they arrive, they find the locals are under Horde Prime's mind control. Through her still-lingering link with Prime's hive mind, Catra learns of this plot and warns Adora, who turns into She-Ra and emits an energy surge which, through her connection with Swift Wind, disables the mind-controlled Elberonians. Entrapta removes Catra's chip, and Catra is accepted by her newfound friends. Unbeknownst to the others, Spinnerella has been secretly fitted with one of the mind control chips.
46	7	"The Perils of Peekablue"	Kiki Manrique	M. Willis	Diana Huh, Angela Kim, and Jessica Zammit	May 15, 2020
Mermista, Sea Hawk, Scorpia, and Perfuma go to a soiree at an underwater nightclub, hoping to recruit the reclusive Prince Peekablue to the rebellion. Peekablue turns out to be Double Trouble in disguise, who tells them that Horde Prime is blockading the planet to prevent Adora's return to Etheria, and many of the guests at the soiree are already under Horde Prime's control. Mermista is given a mind-control chip as well, and she attacks her friends with the help of the soiree guests. Sea Hawk, Perfuma, and Double Trouble escape, but Scorpia stays behind to cover their retreat, allowing herself to be captured. Meanwhile, back at the rebellion's base camp, Spinnerella chips Micah and many other rebels as well. Perfuma sends a message to Adora warning her of the blockade.
47	8	"Shot in the Dark"	Jen Bennett	Katherine Nolfi	Emily Hu, Jasmine Goggins, Sharon Sun, and Mickey Quinn	May 15, 2020
Seeking a weakness that they can exploit against Horde Prime, Adora's party gets Wrong Hordak to admit that such a weakness can be found on the planet Krytis. Arriving there, they find that the planet is in ruins, as a result of long-ago colonization by the First Ones and then the Horde, but still possesses powerful magical energy. They infer that magic itself is Prime's weakness, and encounter a magical cat-like creature named Melog, the last of its kind, who befriends Catra and helps them get past Prime's blockade. Meanwhile, Wrong Hordak experiences an existential crisis upon realizing that Horde Prime is not all-powerful and can be opposed. On Etheria, Castaspella reckons with the turning of her brother, Micah. Shadow Weaver informs Castaspella of her plan to use the planet of Etheria to destroy Hordak Prime using their magic.
48	9	"An Ill Wind"	Kiki Manrique	Laura Sreebny	Julia Braid, Karen Guo, Diana Huh, Angela Kim, and Jessica Zammit	May 15, 2020
Back on Etheria, Adora and her friends infiltrate the occupied town of Erelandia, and discover the residents have been scared into submission. They are attacked by Spinnerella and barely escape after Netossa intervenes. Netossa informs them of the chipping of the world, and they convince her to help then liberate Erelandia. They successfully free Erelandia and drive Spinnerella away after Netossa manages to briefly disrupt the mind control on her. Horde Prime decides to return to Etheria to deal with the rebellion personally. But unknown to him, the first touch of resentment has been stirred in Hordak.
49	10	"Return to the Fright Zone"	Mandy Clotworthy	M. Willis	Charlemagne Co, Sasha Mutch, and Belynda Smith	May 15, 2020
Adora and her companions rejoin the remaining rebels and track Scorpia back to the Fright Zone, while Bow and Glimmer set out to find Bow's fathers. Adora, Catra, Perfuma, Netossa, and Melog sneak into the Fright Zone, but are ambushed by the mind-controlled Spinnerella, Mermista and Scorpia, and Adora's ability to transform is disrupted. Netossa disables Spinnerella's control chip, but Adora and Perfuma are captured by Horde Prime, who reveals that he has found a way to activate the Heart of Etheria even without She-Ra. He instructs Scorpia to destroy Adora and Perfuma, but a remnant of Scorpia's consciousness resists that order. Bow and Glimmer reunite with George and Lance, who have discovered a message from Mara's time revealing the existence of a failsafe that can permanently deactivate the Heart. Glimmer evacuates the others from the Fright Zone.
50	11	"Failsafe"	Mandy Clotworthy	Katherine Nolfi	Charlemagne Co, Sasha Mutch, Belynda Smith, and Mickey Quinn	May 15, 2020
Shadow Weaver and Castaspella reveal that the failsafe for the Heart is hidden in the ruins beneath Mystacor. Led by Shadow Weaver, the team recovers the failsafe, but it must be bonded to a carrier strong enough to resist the release of the magical forces stored within the Heart; only She-Ra qualifies for that task. When Micah attacks the group, seeing her friends in danger enables Adora to transform into She-Ra and thus fuse with the failsafe. Tormented by the prospect of Adora losing her life to save Etheria, Catra leaves with Melog. Meanwhile, Entrapta begins work on taking down Prime's hivemind network before the control chips can permanently fuse with their hosts, and briefly reunites with Hordak, who is troubled by his memories of her.
51	12	"Heart"	Jen Bennett	Josie Campbell	Brendan Clogher, Jasmine Goggins, Diana Huh, Sharon Sun, and Mickey Quinn	May 15, 2020
52	13	"Heart"	Kiki Manrique	ND Stevenson	Emily Hu, Diana Huh, Angela Kim, Wynton Redmond, Mickey Quinn, and Jessica Zammit	May 15, 2020
The rebels prepare for their final strike against Horde Prime. While the others create a distraction for Entrapta to destroy the hive network, Adora, Glimmer, and Bow descend to the Heart of Etheria. Believing that the Heart's destruction is her sole purpose in life, Adora leaves her friends behind. Prime begins tapping into the Heart, and upon noticing Entrapta's meddling, teleports her aboard his flagship. Fearing for Adora's safety as Prime begins to connect to the Heart, Catra reluctantly teams up with Shadow Weaver to follow Adora, while Bow, Glimmer, and Melog set out to rescue the other princesses. Mermista and Scorpia attack the princesses, but Seahawk tells Mermista how much he loves her, causing her to slightly wake up from the mind control and give Perfuma enough time to remove the chip. Whilst they are distracted, Scorpia escapes. Glimmer finds the rest of the team immobilized and is confronted by Micah while Bow is confronted by Scorpia. Adora speaks with Mara in a projection set up by the First Ones; then Prime intrudes on the projection and leaves Adora to be killed by a guard monster. Adora is rescued by Catra and Shadow Weaver, and while Shadow Weaver sacrifices herself to defeat the monster, Catra escorts Adora to the Heart. Glimmer and Bow are forced to fight Micah and Scorpia, and after Glimmer defeats Micah, Bow succeeds in shutting down the mind control network, and rallies the Etherians to rise against Horde Prime. The reawakened Hordak turns against Horde Prime to protect Entrapta, but Prime takes control of Hordak's body and decides to use the Heart to destroy Etheria in a suicidal final act. Adora is unable to transform, but Catra manages to reach out to her. The two share a kiss, and with the support of her love, She-Ra brings down the Heart, restoring Etheria's magic. She then expels Horde Prime's soul from Hordak's body, freeing him and destroying Prime for good. With Etheria liberated, Adora and her friends reunite and plan to restore all magic to the universe. Heart (Part 2) was nominated for an Annie Award for Best TV/Media for children.

== Shorts ==
=== Swift Wind Adventures (2019) ===
No.	Title	Directed by	Written by	Release date
1	"Unicorn Warrior Training!"	Roy Burdine	Written by : Laura Sreebny; Storyboarded by : Roy Burdine	June 12, 2019
Swift Wind helps the Plumerians become warriors.
2	"Arm Wrestling Revenge!"	Roy Burdine	Written by : Katherine Nolfi; Storyboarded by : Adam Henry	June 19, 2019
Swift Wind helps Sea Hawk win his boat back after he lost it in an arm-wrestling contest.
3	"A Princess Birthday Party!"	Roy Burdine	Written by : Josie Campbell; Storyboarded by : Aeri Yoon	June 26, 2019
Swift Wind helps Adora come up with gift ideas for Frosta's birthday.
4	"Grounded Glimmer Jailbreak!"	Roy Burdine	Written by : M. Willis; Storyboarded by : Roy Burdine and Gus Corrales	July 3, 2019
Swift Wind helps Adora sneak into Glimmer's room to "rescue" her from being grounded.
5	"Horse Hero Transformation!"	Roy Burdine	Written by : Josie Campbell; Storyboarded by : Aeri Yoon	July 10, 2019
Adora helps Swift Wind become the horse hero of his dreams.

=== Princess Rebel Recruitment (2019) ===
No.	Title	Release date
1	"Bow Begins the Fight"	August 29, 2019
Bow begins a series of videos to recruit potential Rebellion members.
2	"Glimmer Wants YOU to Join"	September 5, 2019
Glimmer introduces herself and She-Ra, but is interrupted by Angella.
3	"From Adora to She-Ra"	September 12, 2019
Adora talks about being She-Ra.
4	"Meditation with Perfuma"	September 19, 2019
Perfuma attempts to teach meditation.
5	"Mermista is the Coolest"	September 26, 2019
Mermista talks about herself.
6	"Entrapta Stole Bow's Tracker Pad"	October 3, 2019
Entrapta records an experiment.
7	"The Evil Horde is EVIL"	October 10, 2019
The Horde faces off against the Rebellion, and Bow recovers his tracker pad.
