= Scorpia =

Scorpia may refer to:

- Scorpia (comics), a fictional super villain in the Marvel Comics universe
- Scorpia (journalist), pseudonym for a reviewer in Computer Gaming World
- Scorpia (novel), a 2004 Alex Rider novel
- Scorpia, a fictional planet in the science fiction television series Battlestar Galactica
- Scorpia (She-Ra), a character in the animated television series She-Ra: Princess of Power
- Scorpia, a fictional criminal organization in the Phantom comic strip.
