= Karen Fukuhara =

American actress (born 1992)

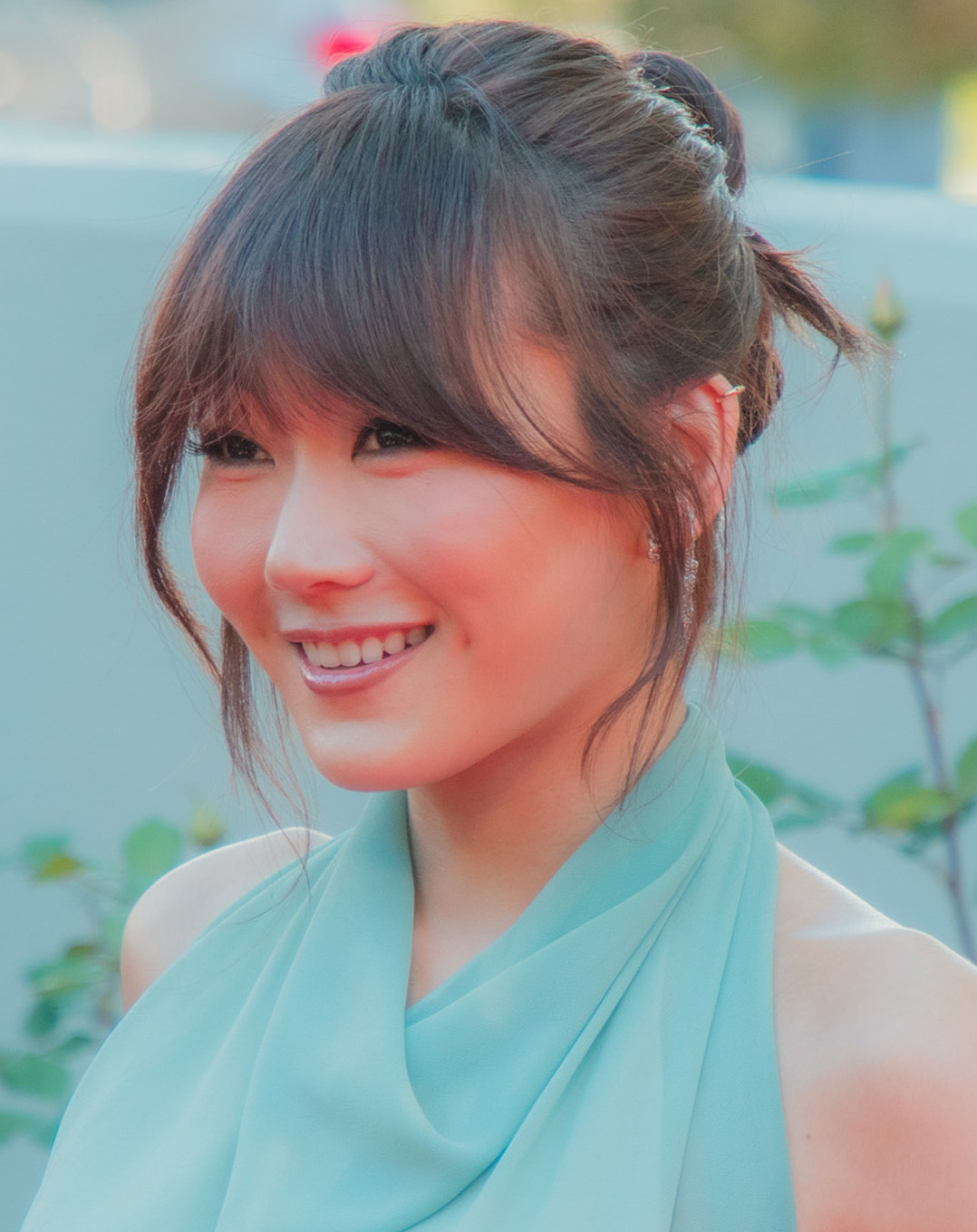
- Fukuhara in 2026
- Born: Stephanie Karen Aika Fukuhara; February 10, 1992 (age 34); Los Angeles, California, U.S.
- Education: University of California, Los Angeles (BA)
- Occupation: Actress
- Years active: 2013–present

Stephanie Karen Aika Fukuhara ( Japanese: 福原 かれん Fukuhara Karen, born February 10, 1992) is an American actress best known for her roles as Tatsu Yamashiro / Katana in the 2016 superhero film Suicide Squad and as Kimiko Miyashiro / The Female of the Species in the satirical superhero series The Boys (2019–2026). Fukuhara is also known for voicing Kipo Oak from Kipo and the Age of Wonderbeasts, Glimmer from She-Ra and the Princesses of Power, and Haru from Pokémon Concierge.

== Early life and education ==
Fukuhara was born on February 10, 1992 to Japanese parents in Los Angeles. Her first language was Japanese, and she attended a Japanese language school on Saturdays for 11 years. She has a younger brother. Fukuhara began practicing karate in middle school, and became a brown-striped belt before leaving for college. She is a lifetime fan of the Pokémon franchise and enjoyed playing her Game Boy growing up.

Fukuhara attended University of California, Los Angeles (UCLA) while working as a reporter for a sports show on NHK in Japan. She was a part of the Cultural Affairs Commission. She was a member of the a cappella group Medleys, whose alumni include fellow actress Kelly Marie Tran. Fukuhara graduated from UCLA in 2014 with a Bachelor of Arts in Sociology and a minor in Theater before continuing on to receive her JD with a specialization in Media, Entertainment, Technology and Sport at UCLA law.

== Career ==
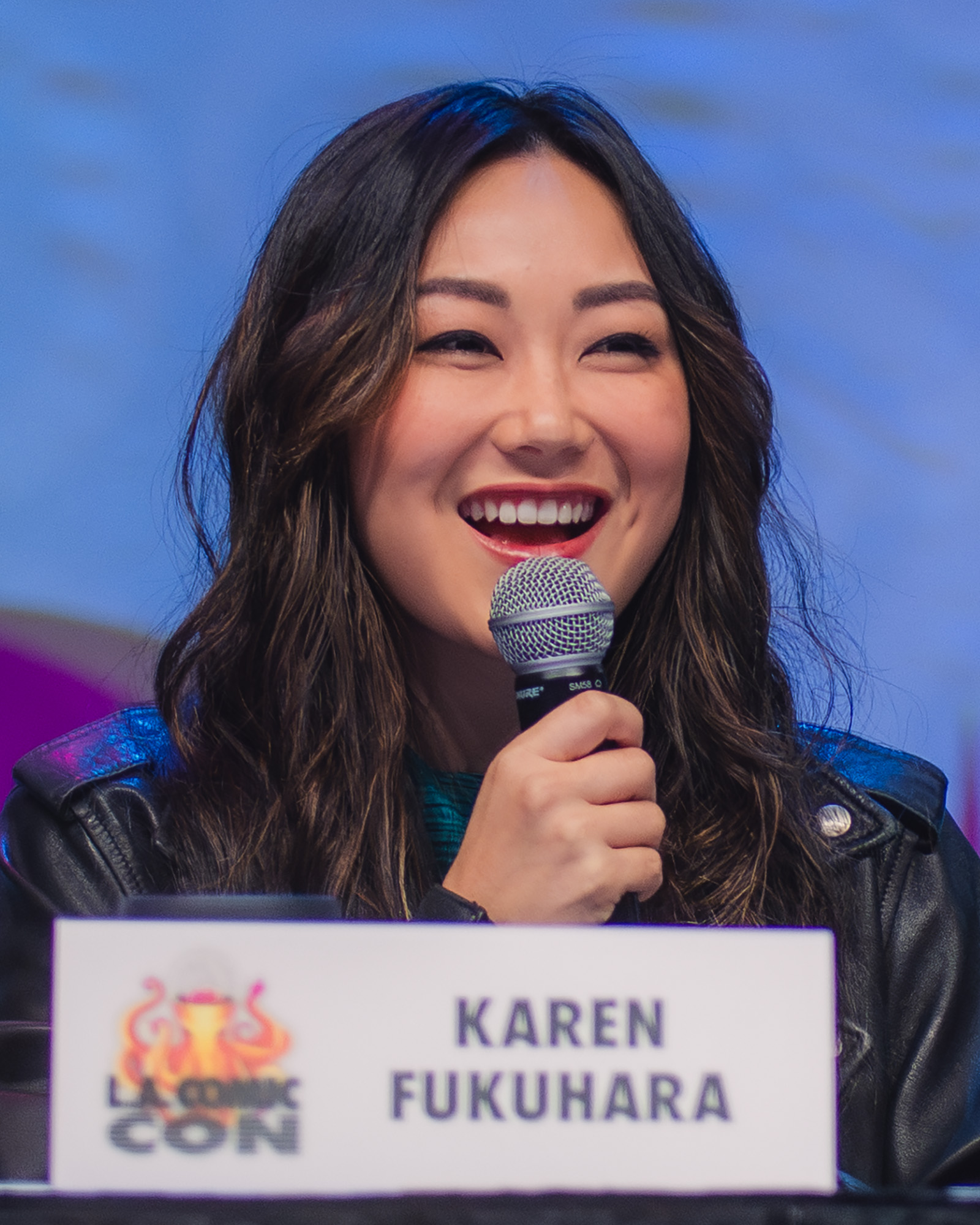
Fukuhara in 2023

Fukuhara got her start in the entertainment industry in middle school when she was cast as a host for Movie Surfers, a short-form entertainment news program on the Disney Channel.

Before her acting-debut, Fukuhara worked various part-time jobs, including translator, subtitle editor, and waitress at a reggae-themed sushi restaurant.

In 2016, Fukuhara made her film-debut as Katana in the DC Comics superhero film Suicide Squad, which was released in August 2016. Although she had martial arts experience, Fukuhara trained for about two months to learn to wield a sword.

In 2019, Fukuhara appeared in Stray, alongside Christine Woods, Miyavi, and Ross Partridge.

Fukuhara voiced the characters Sewer Queen and Alexis in the Cartoon Network series Craig of the Creek. In 2018, she began voicing Glimmer in She-Ra and the Princesses of Power, a reboot of the 1985 animated television series.

In 2019, she began starring as Kimiko Miyashiro / The Female of the Species in the Amazon Prime series The Boys, based on the comic book of the same name.

In 2020, she voiced the titular lead-character of Kipo and the Age of Wonderbeasts, a series based on the short-lived webcomic Kipo.

In 2023, Netflix announced that Fukuhara would voice Haru, the titular character of Pokémon Concierge.

== Filmography ==
=== Film ===
Year	Title	Role	Notes	Ref.
2016	Suicide Squad	Tatsu Yamashiro / Katana		
2017	The Lost	Laura Baker	Short	
2019	Stray	Nori		
2020	Bobbleheads: The Movie	Ikioi	Voice role; Direct-to-DVD	
2022	Bullet Train	Kayda Izumi Concession Girl		
2023	The Boy and the Heron	Lady Himi	Voice role; English dub	
2023	Craig Before the Creek	Alexis	Voice role; TV movie	
2025	Stone Cold Fox	Minx		

=== Television ===
Year	Title	Role	Notes	Ref.
2018–2020	She-Ra and the Princesses of Power	Glimmer	Voice role; 48 episodes	
2018–2024	Craig of the Creek	Sewer Queen, Alexis	Voice role; Recurring; 21 episodes	
2019–2026	The Boys	Kimiko Miyashiro / The Female of the Species	Series regular; 37 episodes	
2020	Kipo and the Age of Wonderbeasts	Kipo Oak	Voice role; 30 episodes	
2021	Archer	Reiko	Voice role; Episode: "Dingo, baby, et cetera"	
2021–2025	Star Wars: Visions	F	Short film: The Village Bride (English Dub); Short film: The Lost Ones (English Dub)	
2022	Modern Love Tokyo	Tamami	Voice role; Episode: "He's Playing Our Song" (English Dub)	
2023–2025	Pokémon Concierge	Haru	Voice role; 8 episodes (English Dub)	
2024	Alice's Wonderland Bakery	Sakura	Voice role; Episode: "Dance of the Cherry Blossoms"	
2024–2025	Tomb Raider: The Legend of Lara Croft	Sam Nishimura	Voice role; 9 episodes	

=== Video games ===
Year	Title	Role	Notes	Ref.
2022	The Callisto Protocol	Dani Nakamura	Performance capture, voice	

=== Commercials ===
Year	Title	Voice role	Notes
2021	Taco Bell: Nacho Fries — Fry Force	Rei	

== Awards ==
- 2021 IMDb StarMeter Award
- 2024 Hollywood Creative Alliance Astra Award for Best Actress in a Streaming Drama (for The Boys)
