= Linda Gary =

American voice actress (1944–1995)

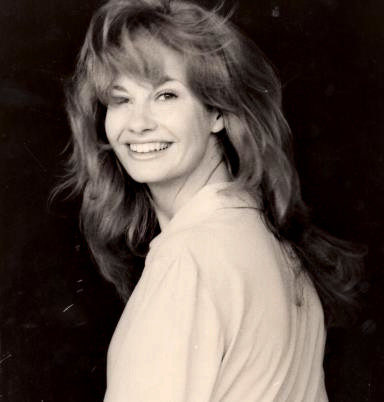
- Gary in 1971
- Born: Linda Gary Dewoskin; November 4, 1944; Los Angeles, California, U.S.
- Died: October 5, 1995 (aged 50); North Hollywood, California, U.S.
- Resting place: Mount Sinai Memorial Park Cemetery
- Occupations: Actress; counselor
- Years active: 1971–1995
- Spouse: Charles Howerton (m. 1967)
- Children: 3

Linda Gary (born Linda Gary Dewoskin, November 4, 1944 – October 5, 1995) was an American actress. Gary was best known for her work in animated series and films, such as providing voices of several female characters in He-Man and the Masters of the Universe and She-Ra: Princess of Power.

== Career ==
Gary's height was a contributing factor that took her to voice acting. Gary stood at 5 feet 9 inches (1.75 meters), and once stated that she never had a lot of work due to her height. Gary also preferred voice acting because she had "more [opportunities] to play different characters." Gary dubbed Italian films after landing in Rome, Italy from a five-month travel around Europe with her husband Charles Howerton. Director Mel Welles helped Gary, along with Howerton, find dubbing jobs there. According to Gary on The Los Angeles Times in 1987, she was "playing not only the young lead and the heroine, but [she] was [also] the mother, the grandmother, and the child." Gary and Howerton returned to the United States in 1974, starting their careers on their own.

Gary went to voice acting classes taught by Daws Butler. She later claimed "When I got my first voice over job, I just sent Daws the check...He believed in me, and I really have him to thank for my career." Gary voiced Teela, Evil-Lyn, Sorceress of Castle Grayskull, and Queen Marlena in He-Man and the Masters of the Universe. Gary also voiced Madame Razz, Scorpia, Glimmer, and Shadow Weaver in She-Ra: Princess of Power. Outside of acting, she worked as a counselor at a nonsectarian crisis counseling center affiliated with Temple Beth Hillel Beth Abraham in North Hollywood, California.

== Personal life ==
Gary was born in Los Angeles, California, on November 4, 1944. She married actor Charles Howerton on December 21, 1967, and had two daughters. Gary was also stepmother to Howerton's daughter from his previous marriage, Lynn Howerton. She died of heart failure and complications of brain cancer on October 5, 1995, at her home in North Hollywood, California, at age 50. She is buried at Mount Sinai Memorial Park Cemetery in Hollywood Hills.

== Filmography ==
=== Voice over roles ===
==== Film ====
Year	Title	Role	Notes
1971	Lady Frankenstein	Dr. Tania Frankenstein	English dub; uncredited
1981	Wolfen	ESS	
1984	Nausicaä of the Valley of the Wind	Queen Selena, Old Lady	1985 English dub; uncredited
1985	The Secret of the Sword	Teela, Queen Marlena, Sorceress of Castle Grayskull, Shadow Weaver, Glimmer, Madame Razz	
1985	He-Man & She-Ra: A Christmas Special	Teela, Queen Marlena	Television special
1987	Pinocchio and the Emperor of the Night	Bee Atrice	
1988	Top Cat and the Beverly Hills Cats	Mrs. Vandergelt	
1989	Happily Ever After	Critterina, Marina	
1991	Switch	God	
1993	The Very Hungry Caterpillar & Other Stories	Narrator	
1994	The Land Before Time II: The Great Valley Adventure	Grandma Longneck	
1995	The Land Before Time III: The Time of the Great Giving	Grandma Longneck, Mother Quetzalcoatlus	Posthumous release
1996	The Land Before Time IV: Journey Through the Mists	Grandma Longneck	Posthumous release, final film role

==== Television ====
Year	Title	Role	Notes
1976–1980	Tarzan, Lord of the Jungle	Jane	
1981	Blackstar	Mara, Taleena, Amber, Storm, Leilanna	
1981	Spider-Man	Colleen	
1981–1989	The Smurfs	Dame Barbara (seasons 2 and 3), Chlorhydris (seasons 3–8)	Name misspelled in credits as "Linda Gray"
1983	The Dukes	Additional voices (Season 1)	
1983–1984	The New Scooby and Scrappy-Doo Show	Additional voices	
1983–1985	He-Man and the Masters of the Universe	Teela, Evil-Lyn, Queen Marlena, Sorceress of Castle Grayskull, additional characters	
1985	The 13 Ghosts of Scooby-Doo	Queen Morbidia, Nekara	
1985–1986	She-Ra: Princess of Power	Scorpia, Entrapta, Madame Razz, Shadow Weaver, Glimmer, additional characters	
1985–1986	The Transformers	Chromia, Fairy-tale princess, Witch, Disco Girl #2	
1989	Beetle Bailey	Miss Buxley, Ms. Blips	
1991–1993	The Pirates of Dark Water	Additional voices	
1992	Rugrats	Mabel	Episode: "Graham Canyon"
1992–1994	Batman: The Animated Series	Additional voices	
1993–1994	SWAT Kats: The Radical Squadron	Dr. Abby Sinian	
1994	Spider-Man: The Animated Series	Aunt May Parker	
1995	The Sylvester & Tweety Mysteries	Beulah	Episode: "B2 or Not B2"

==== Video games ====
Year	Title	Role	Notes
1984	Thayer's Quest	Lady in the Woodlands	
1992	King's Quest VI	Oracle, Red Chess Queen, Mother Ghost, Queen Allaria	
1993	Gabriel Knight: Sins of the Fathers	Grandma Knight	
1995	Labyrinth of Crete	Hera	

==== Theme parks ====
Year	Title	Role	Notes
1995	Disney's Fantillusion	Maleficent	
1998	Fantasmic!	Maleficent, Opening Announcer	

=== Live action roles ===
==== Film ====
Year	Title	Role	Notes
1971	My Name Is Rocco Papaleo	Jenny	
1977	Joyride to Nowhere	Boutique Clerk	
1980	Cruising		
1981	Smokey Bites the Dust	Woman Sheriff	
1996	Father Frost	Storyteller	Posthumous release
