= Merit Leighton =

American actress (born 2002)

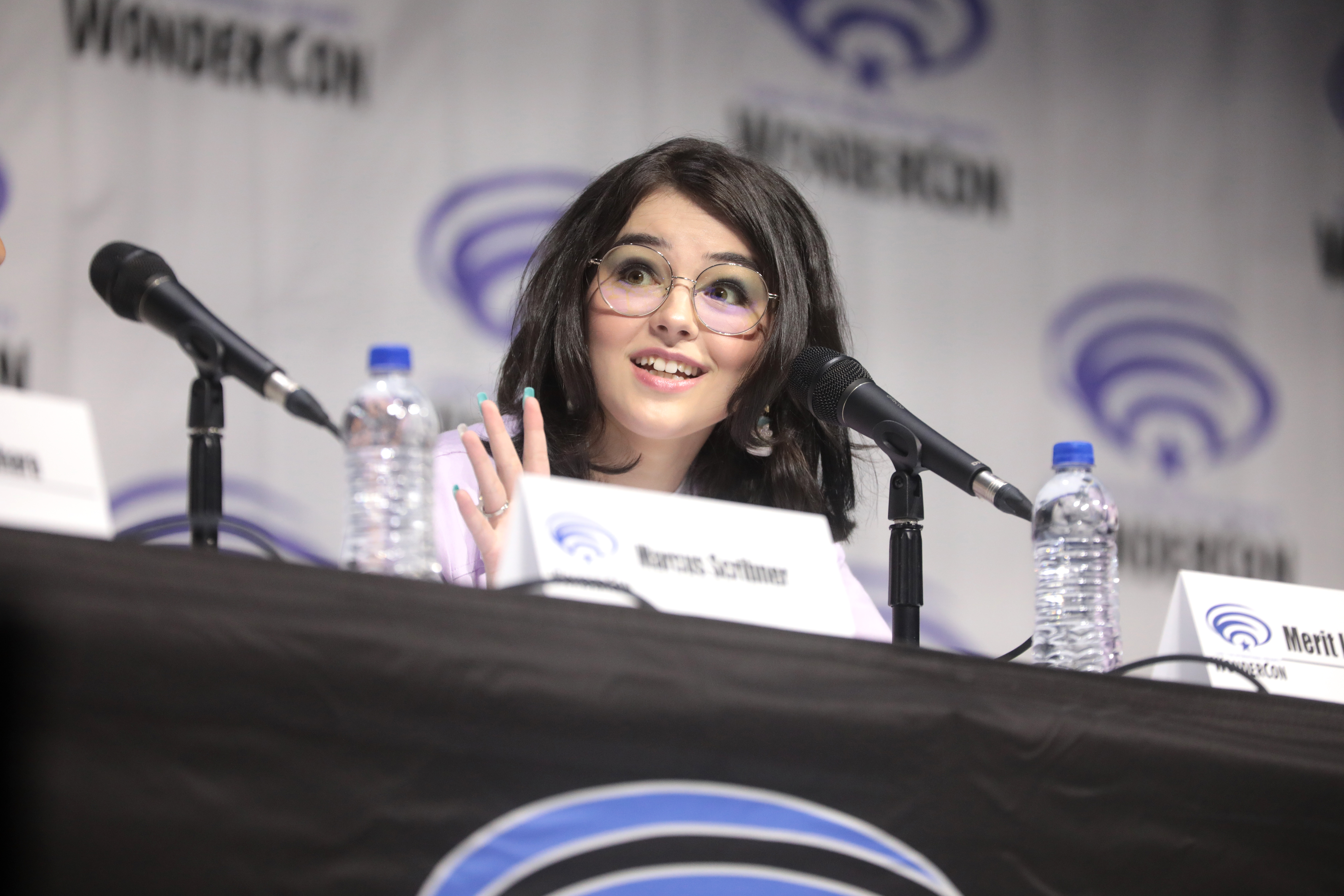
- Leighton in 2019
- Born: June 17, 2002 (age 24); Glendale, California
- Occupation: Actress
- Years active: 2010–present

Merit Leighton (born June 17, 2002) is an American actress. She is best known for voicing Frosta in the animated superhero series She-Ra and the Princesses of Power, as well as playing Hannah in Alexa & Katie.

== Early life ==
Leighton was born in Glendale, California on June 17, 2002. She got interested in acting at age five when she realised that her TV wasn't an entrance to another universe. Her mother is a photographer who got a call from a management company who wanted Merit to sign with them. Soon after she signed she got her first audition.

Leighton is autistic.

== Career ==
Leighton's first voice acting role was as Lucinda in Disney Junior's television series Sofia the First. Her first big role came when she voiced Frosta in the superhero animated series She-Ra and the Princesses of Power.

In 2019 she was cast in her first anime role as Minako in Ride Your Wave. Leighton's biggest role so far has been playing Hannah in the sitcom Alexa & Katie. She has her own YouTube channel where she talks about K-pop, anime, Nintendo video games.

== Filmography ==
=== Film ===
Year	Title	Role	Notes
2010	Specifically	Pretty Girl	Short
2011	Monster Slayer	Bea	Short
2013	The Lost Medallion: The Adventures of Billy Stone	Foster kid	
2013	Grooming Giselle	Emma	
2013	Dean Slater: Resident Advisor	Meredith Harris	
2014	The Tiger's Tail	Doreen Portman	
2015	Let Go	Sarah	Short
2017	The Nerd Posse	Sailor Greyson	
2018	Planeman	Malynada	Short
2018	Parker Bubblegum	Malynada	
2017	Ride Your Wave	Hinako	
2020	The Wave of Perfection	Juniper	Short

=== Television ===
Year	Title	Role	Notes
2012	The New Normal	Large girl	Episode: "Sofa's choice"
2013-2018	Sofia the First	Lucinda the Witch	6 episodes
2015	Dad Dudes	Olivia	Episode: "Pilot"
2015	40s and Failing	Ally	4 episodes
2019	Spirit Riding Free	Eliza Moreno	Episode: "Lucky and the Dressage Sabotage"
2018-2020	She-Ra and the Princesses of Power	Frosta	20 episodes
2018-2020	Alexa & Katie	Hannah	23 episodes
2025	Synduality: Noir	Ellie	English dub
2025	Wandance	Hikari Wanda	English dub
2026	Sofia the First: Royal Magic	Lucinda the Witch	Episode: "Costume Clash"

=== Video Games ===
Year	Title	Role	Notes
2020	Legends of Runeterra	Tornado Warrior	
2021	Cookie Run: Kingdom	Sugarfly Cookie	
2024	Persona 3 Reload	Chidori Yoshino	
2025	Mecha Break	S.H.A.D.O.W operating system	
