= She-Ra and the Princesses of Power =

2018 American animated TV series

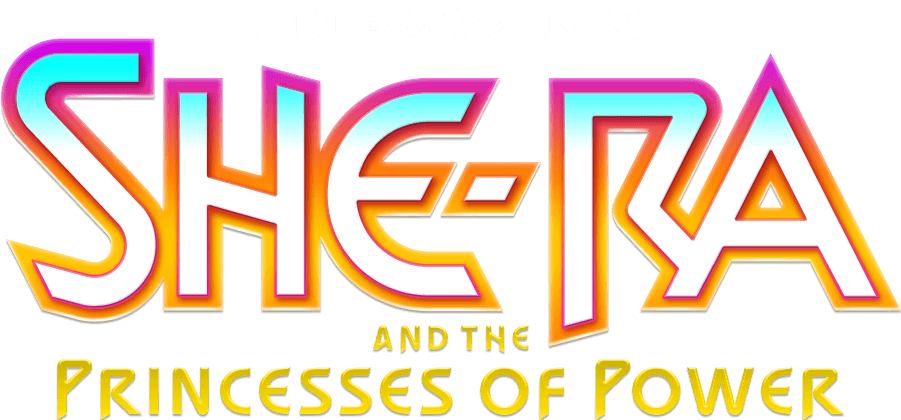
- Genre: Science fantasy; Sword and planet; Magical girl; Dramedy; Superhero
- Based on: She-Ra: Princess of Power by Larry DiTillio and J. Michael Straczynski
- Developed by: ND Stevenson
- Showrunner: ND Stevenson
- Voices of: Aimee Carrero; AJ Michalka; Karen Fukuhara; Marcus Scribner; Reshma Shetty; Lorraine Toussaint; Lauren Ash; Christine Woods; Genesis Rodriguez; Vella Lovell; Jordan Fisher; Merit Leighton; Keston John; Daniel Dae Kim
- Theme music composer: Kari Kimmel
- Opening theme: "Warriors" by Aaliyah Rose
- Composer: Sunna Wehrmeijer
- Country of origin: United States
- Original language: English
- No. of seasons: 5
- No. of episodes: 52 (list of episodes)

Production
- Executive producers: ND Stevenson; Chuck Austen
- Running time: 23–24 minutes
- Production companies: Mattel Television; DreamWorks Animation Television

Original release
- Network: Netflix
- Release: November 13, 2018 – May 15, 2020

Related
- She-Ra: Princess of Power; He-Man; He-Man and the Masters of the Universe (1983); He-Man and the Masters of the Universe (2002); He-Man and the Masters of the Universe (2021)

She-Ra and the Princesses of Power is an American animated superhero television series developed by ND Stevenson and produced by DreamWorks Animation Television for Netflix. It is a reboot of the 1985 Filmation series She-Ra: Princess of Power, and like the original series, it tells the tale of Adora, an adolescent who can transform into the heroine She-Ra and leads a group of other magical princesses in a rebellion against the evil Lord Hordak and his Horde.

She-Ra and the Princesses of Power received critical acclaim, with particular praise for its diverse cast and the complex relationship between She-Ra and her best friend-turned-archenemy Catra. In 2019, the show was nominated for a GLAAD Media Award for Outstanding Kids & Family Programming, as well as a Daytime Emmy Award at the 46th Daytime Emmy Awards. In 2021, the series was tied with First Day when it won the GLAAD Media Award for Outstanding Kids and Family Programming.

The series ran on Netflix from November 13, 2018, to May 15, 2020, having released 52 episodes over 5 seasons. On linear TV, the show previously aired on CBBC in the United Kingdom, before it moved to Pop on January 30, 2023. It also aired on Disney Channel and DreamWorks Channel across the globe. The series was removed from Netflix on February 21, 2026, due to the expiration of DreamWorks' license to keep the series on the streaming service.

== Synopsis ==
She-Ra and the Princesses of Power is set on the planet Etheria and follows the stories of Adora and Catra, orphans who were raised to be soldiers in the Horde. They are part of an evil army led by Hordak, a tyrannical despot who dreams of conquering the planet. One day, after getting lost in the woods, Adora finds a magic sword that transforms her into the legendary Princess of Power, She-Ra. After learning that the Horde is actually evil and has been inflicting suffering on Etheria and its inhabitants, Adora decides to join the Rebellion in the fight against the Horde. She helps rebuild the Princess Alliance, a league of kingdoms ruled by other magical princesses. Adora's newfound allegiance to the Rebellion pits her against Catra, her former best friend, whose feelings of betrayal and abandonment twist her personal ambitions and lead her to become Adora's archenemy. Much of the show centers around their conflict.

In the first season, Adora helps reassemble the Princess Alliance, which successfully defends the rebel stronghold of Bright Moon against the Horde's assault. Meanwhile, Catra rises in the ranks to become Hordak's second-in-command.

In the second and third seasons, Hordak attempts to build an interdimensional portal which will allow him to contact his creator, the interplanetary warlord Horde Prime. Catra activates the portal even though it threatens to tear the planet apart, and rebellion leader Queen Angella sacrifices herself to stop it.

In the fourth season, friction arises between Adora and her friend Glimmer (Angella's daughter and the new queen of Bright Moon) when Adora learns that her sword is the key to an ancient superweapon inside Etheria. In order to prevent the weapon from activating, Adora destroys her sword, losing access to her She-Ra powers, but not before Etheria is pulled through a portal, becoming vulnerable to attack by Horde Prime's armada.

The fifth and final season follows Adora's journey to liberate Etheria from Horde Prime's reign. Adora rescues a redeemed Catra and Glimmer from Horde Prime, discovering her innate She-Ra powers in the process, but in the meantime Horde Prime has subdued much of Etheria with his mind-control capabilities. The princesses and Catra work together to disable Horde Prime's hivemind and stop him from accessing Etheria's ancient superweapon. In the end, it is Adora and Catra's love for each other that enables She-Ra to destroy both the weapon and Horde Prime, and save the universe from his tyrannical reign.

== Voice cast and characters ==
- Aimee Carrero as Princess Adora / She-Ra
  - LaLa Nestor as young Princess Adora
- AJ Michalka as Catra
  - Juliet Donenfeld as young Catra
- Karen Fukuhara as Glimmer, Princess of Bright Moon
- Marcus Scribner as Bow
- Reshma Shetty as Angella, Queen of Bright Moon
- Lorraine Toussaint as Shadow Weaver
- Keston John as Hordak, Horde Prime, Grizzlor, Admiral Scurvy, Wrong Hordak, Horde Sergeant, Horde clones
- Lauren Ash as Scorpia, Princess of the Fright Zone
- Christine Woods as Entrapta, Princess of Dryl
- Genesis Rodriguez as Perfuma, Princess of Plumeria
- Jordan Fisher as Sea Hawk, Seneschal, and Soda Pop
- Vella Lovell as Mermista, Princess of Salineas
- Merit Leighton as Frosta, Princess of the Kingdom of Snows
- Sandra Oh as Castaspella, sorcerer of Mystacor
- Krystal Joy Brown as Netossa, rebel princess
- ND Stevenson as Spinnerella, rebel princess, and Serenia
- Morla Gorrondona as Light Hope
- Grey Griffin as Razz
- Adam Ray as Swift Wind
- Geena Davis as Huntara
- Zehra Fazal as Mara
- Chris Jai Alex as George, one of Bow's fathers
- Regi Davis as Lance, one of Bow's fathers
- Dana Davis as Lonnie
- Antony Del Rio as Kyle
- Daniel Dae Kim as Micah, King of Bright Moon
  - Taylor Gray as young Micah
- Jake Eberle as Norwyn and Tung Lashor
- Jacob Tobia as Double Trouble
- Amanda C. Miller as Flutterina
- Amy Landecker as Octavia
- Alex Blue Davis as Jewelstar
- Ashley Eckstein as Tallstar
- Melissa Fumero as Starla
- John Lavelle as Peekablue

== Production ==
=== Development ===
Development and production of the series began concurrently in April 2016. It was announced on December 12, 2017. Showrunner ND Stevenson initially pitched it to Netflix on the assumption of creating only one season, but in November 2018, he explained that "we now have four arcs of 13 episodes done". She-Ra is created using traditional animation, with the exception of some computer animation for "complicated machinery". The animation is provided by South Korean studio NE4U.

=== Themes ===
The first season of the serialized She-Ra reboot focuses on establishing the characters and their relationships in order to set up future seasons, initially by way of a "mission-of-the-week" plot to have the core cast of Adora and her close friends, Glimmer and Bow recruit princesses to their rebellion. While the core premise and characters of the original series were carried over, as well as many of its affectations (such as Adora's transformation catchphrase "For the honor of Grayskull!"), the reboot sets itself apart from the 1980s series by its almost entirely female cast. The characters were deliberately made to be diverse, both in appearance and in character traits. For instance, some characters range from good to "evil but understandable", "utterly amoral" or "full-blown hippie". He-Man, who in the original version was She-Ra's brother who "awakens her destiny", does not appear in the reboot, in order to set up She-Ra as a hero in her own right.

According to Stevenson, the show's thematic core is the relationships among its characters, which range from "wide-eyed love" to "heart-rending jealousy, crushes and infatuations". Reviewers particularly highlighted the convincing portrayal of the anti-hero Catra and her complicated "frenemy" relationship with Adora, which The Verge described as "the best animated antihero story since Avatar: The Last Airbender's Zuko". In addition, the series addresses such themes as abusive relationships and overcoming trauma, prejudice, isolationism (as exemplified, initially, by the princesses), colonization, imperialism, and genocide (a result of Hordak's planetary-scale warfare). There is a strong focus on the struggle to break free of sociopolitical indoctrination, explored mainly through the stories of Adora, Hordak, and Light Hope. The series also emphasizes the necessity of taking action no matter one's own power or circumstances; it portrays magic as fallible and dependent on its wielder's skill and determination—Adora's powers in particular are directly tied to her love for her friends. Despite this, Adora's main internal conflict stems from being told she must suppress her personal desires in order to be the hero Etheria needs. Finally, Horde Prime's regime in Season 5 contains elements reminiscent of fundamentalist Christianity, which Stevenson has noted are not meant to be criticisms of religion itself but rather the kind of leadership seen in extremist, cult-like organizations.

In June 2020, Stevenson said that Catra was a woman of color, saying he discussed her "being a brown Latina" when designing her, although this was not "explicitly, textually present in the show," Stevenson also expressed enthusiasm for fans interpreting Catra as representing Persian ethnicity.

==== Influences ====
Stevenson cited Steven Universe as a series that paved the way for She-Ra, saying his early conversations about queer relationships and characters in She-Ra were only possible because of Steven Universe. In another interview, he implied influence of Steven Universe on the show. He noted that the crew wanted to introduce Catra's pink lion Clawdeen, from the original She-Ra series, into his series, but decided to not do so because its design was "pretty much identical" to Steven Universe's Lion. As a result, he chose Melog as a "therapy animal" for Catra instead. Stevenson also noted the importance of featuring LGBTQ+ representation in kids animation, saying earlier shows made She-Ra's "range of queer representation" possible.

The show was also influenced by sci-fi in the 1970s and 1980s, paying homage to the original She-Ra: Princess of Power show, and Dungeons & Dragons. Stevenson called the show basically a D&D campaign, with Adora, Glimmer, and Bow falling into "specific classes in D&D." Additionally, Stevenson and the show's crew were strongly influenced by anime, especially those with magical girls.

==== LGBTQ representation ====
The creators indicated prior to release that the series would provide LGBTQ representation. Tor.com commented that the series "reads as utterly queer in just about every aspect", with many characters coded as fluid in terms of gender or sexuality, and none as clearly heterosexual. Stevenson said that when a network executive asked what the rainbow in the climax of the first season's finale meant, he replied: "The gay agenda". In March 2021, Stevenson told Vanity Fair that early in the show's run there "had to be plausible deniability" around most queer relationships, but this changed once he got "positive, vocal support from fans of the show" who picked up on queer subtext and wanted more. This enabled Stevenson to sell executives on the idea that the "queer relationship between the two leads [was] to be the climax of the entire show."

The relationship between Adora and Catra has subtextual undercurrents of romantic tension from the beginning of the series, and concludes with a mutual confession of love and an on-screen kiss in the very last episode. The scene has been regarded as a revolutionary moment in the history of children's media and LGBT representation. Other reviews praised the "queer romance" manifested by the Adora-Catra relationship and said that this slow-burn romance (Note: Bustle defines a slow burn as a "romance novel that focuses on a character-driven love story where that relationship takes some time to develop," with the same applying to animation.) was a groundbreaking moment for TV.

The series features same-sex attraction and romance among secondary and side characters as well. Two of the princesses, Spinerella and Netossa, are a married couple, and their relationship receives more attention in a plot arc in the fifth season when Netossa must rescue her wife from the villain's mind control. An episode focusing on Bow, the male lead, explores his relationship with his two fathers Lance and George. Additionally, it is strongly implied that Scorpia, Catra's right-hand woman, has a crush on her and arranges pseudo-dates disguised as "side missions." Scorpia also mentions that the Horde soldier Kyle has a crush on his coworker, a humanoid lizard man named Rogelio, and ND Stevenson once tweeted that he envisions the two in a polyamorous relationship that involves their cohort Lonnie. Adora's mentor Light Hope is a female artificial intelligence who, while generally devoid of emotion, felt genuine affection for the woman Mara. In August 2020, Stevenson elaborated on Twitter that Light Hope's feelings were romantic.

In addition to same-sex romance, the show also includes transgender characters. The fourth season introduces a minor antagonist named Double Trouble, who is referred to with the singular they pronoun. Double Trouble's voice actor is also non-binary. Additionally, character designer Ray Geiger said on Tumblr that the character Jewelstar (who presented as female in the original series but presents as male in an episode of the remake) is a transgender man, just like his voice actor, Alex Blue Davis. In the same post, Geiger also said that they designed Adora's friend Perfuma while envisioning her as a trans woman but never told anyone for fear of censorship.

In June 2021, Stevenson told Insider that while the show's staff had a "good number of trans and nonbinary crew," criticism from some of Double Trouble as a villain and a "nonbinary character whose gender nonconformity was conflated with...alienness," blindsided him, admitting he "might have done some things differently," had he known of this perspective. He also said this conversation was important because "it points to the limits of our imagination." Tobia also told the publication that non-binary representation on screen needs to reflect the diversity of the non-binary community and make a statement to viewers in the process.

=== Staff and cast ===
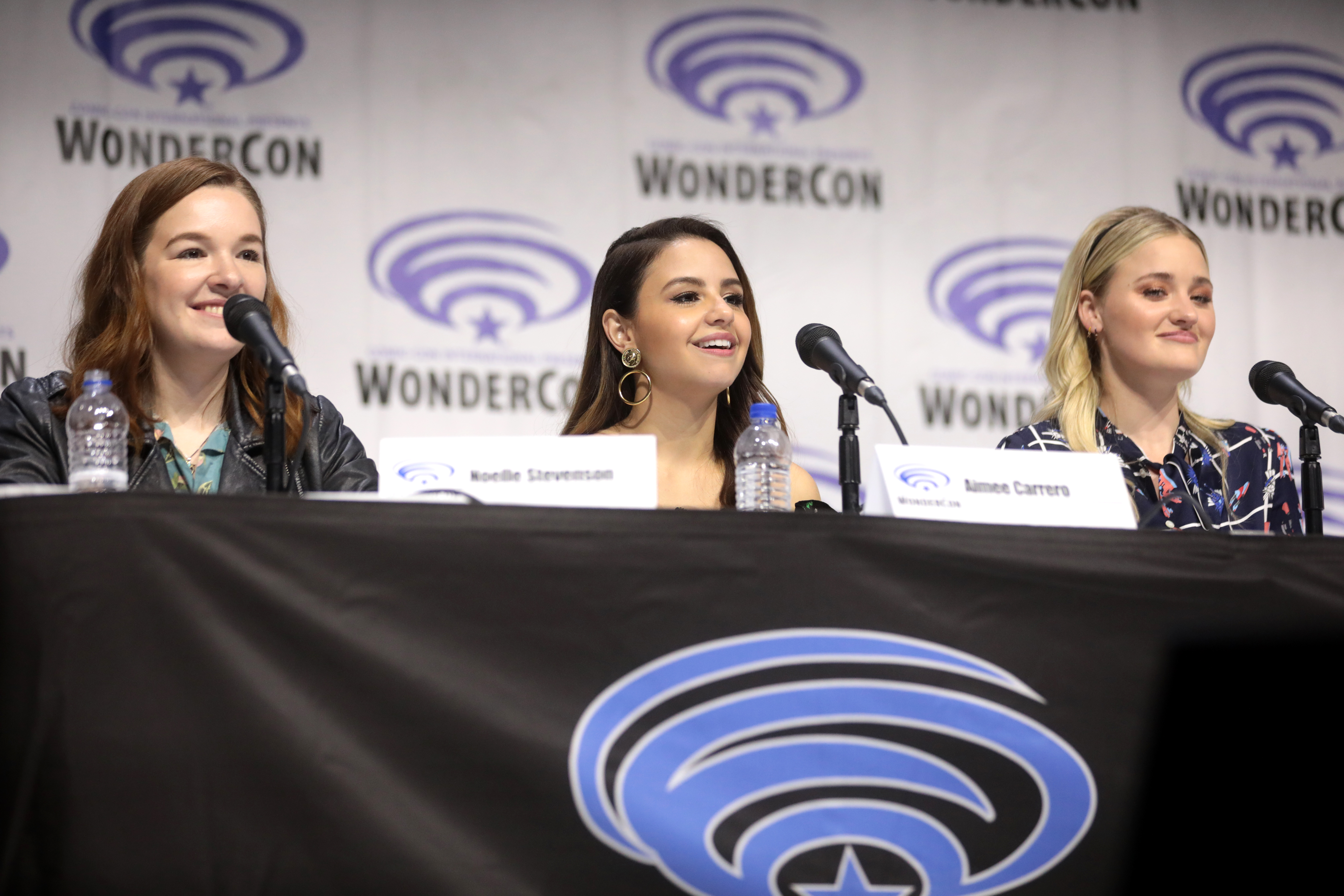
ND Stevenson, the creator of the rebooted She-Ra, with Aimee Carrero, voice of She-Ra, and AJ Michalka, voice of Catra

The series' showrunner and creator, ND Stevenson, is a cartoonist who became known for his Eisner Award-winning comics Nimona and Lumberjanes. The principal voice cast includes Aimee Carrero as She-Ra, AJ Michalka as Catra, Karen Fukuhara as Glimmer, and Marcus Scribner as Bow. Mary Elizabeth McGlynn is the voice director. The series has an all-female writers' room, and only one man in the regular voice cast. Around 45 people worked on She-Ra in the DreamWorks offices in Glendale.

=== Design ===
Visually, the rebooted She-Ra series takes inspiration from anime and the works of Hayao Miyazaki and Moebius. Whereas the original series' heroines were all of exactly the same size and shape to facilitate animation and toy production, and were all white (with the late exception of Netossa), the new series' characters are intentionally diverse in shape and ethnicity.

==== Character design ====
She-Ra in the 1985 series (left) and her 2018 redesign (right) that triggered debate on social media

After first images of She-Ra's design were released in July 2018, controversy ensued on social media. Some Internet users contended that she was not as "beautiful and sexy", voluptuous or glamorous as in the original series, or that she looked like a boy. Other users responded that the new series tried to avoid sexualizing a children's show, and conveyed body positivity.

J. Michael Straczynski, the co-creator of the original series, commented that his She-Ra was written as "a warrior, first and foremost", and that "anyone who is looking back at [her] as the 'ideal woman' is doing so through the lens of prepubescent ... interest and kind of, understandably, imprinted on her like baby ducks. I get it. But that wasn't the creative intent." Fan artists, mostly young women inspired by the new design's detractors to improve the new character's profile and her reputation, responded to She-Ra's redesign and the controversy over it with a wave of artworks celebrating the heroine's new look.

=== Music ===
The series' title song is "Warriors" by Aaliyah Rose. The Washington Post highlighted it as one of the "theme song/opening credits so good it must not be skipped, right up there with Daredevil, The Crown and Narcos".

The soundtrack was composed by Sunna Wehrmeijer. She aimed at creating a "contemporary '80s synth-sound combined with orchestral adventure", based on the creators' desire to feature "big and epic" but also "sparkly" music. A soundtrack album was released on May 8, 2020, which included a cover of the theme song by AJ Michalka.

== Broadcast and promotion ==
=== Episodes ===
Season	Episodes	Originally released
1	13	November 13, 2018
2	7	April 26, 2019
3	6	August 2, 2019
4	13	November 5, 2019
5	13	May 15, 2020

=== Promotion and release ===
A first teaser trailer released in September 2018 showcased Adora's transformation into She-Ra. Longer trailers were released in October and November 2018. On January 24, 2019, the network announced the series' renewal for a second season, which debuted on April 26 of that year. A third season was released on August 2, 2019. The fourth season was released on November 5, 2019. The fifth and final season was released on May 15, 2020.

As a novelty for a television series, the series' website is available in a virtual reality format, and is set up to present the user with a virtual crystal palace.

In December 2025, ComicBook reported that the series may leave Netflix on February 21, 2026, due to the expiration of DreamWorks' license to keep the series on the streaming service. In subsequent articles, the news was later confirmed by Collider, ComicBook, and CBR noting that it was not known where, and if, the media would be streaming again, and noting that some fans were frustrated and would turn to online piracy to watch the series after it is taken off Netflix. On social media, Stevenson said that this news was not surprising, noting that the same has happened to other DreamWorks series as their Netflix licenses expired, meaning that "years of hard work by many talented crews have ended up without a home," adding that showrunners have no control of it. He also expressed hope that the entire series would find "a new home," that the series would have a full DVD release, and urged fans to watch the series "while you can, and keep records whenever possible. Its legacy is in your hands." In January 2026, Collider, Safwan Azeem said the series removal comes along with the removal of other Netflix Originals and extends to "fan-favorite titles." It was later confirmed that February 20 would be the last day people could stream the series on Netflix, one day earlier than originally reported, with the series' removal described by some as a "betrayal of queer storytelling."

== Home media ==
=== DVD releases ===
Region 1 compilation DVDs
DVD title	Season(s)	Aspect ratio	Episode count	Total running time	Release date(s)
She-Ra and the Princesses of Power: Seasons 1–3	1–3	16:9	26	602 minutes	December 3, 2019

== Reception ==
=== Critical response ===
While Metacritic has not assigned the series a weighted average score, it has given all six reviews by mainstream critics a score of an 80 or above out of 100.

The first season received critical acclaim, with the review aggregator Rotten Tomatoes reporting a 100% approval rating based on 25 reviews, with an average rating of 7.7/10. The site's critical consensus reads: "By the grace of Greyskull, [the first season of] She-Ra and the Princesses of Power packs a powerful visual punch that hits even harder thanks to layered writing and multidimensional characters – the perfect show for seasoned fans and little ones alike." Some stated that the series had a lot in common with shows such as Avatar: The Last Airbender, Steven Universe and Sailor Moon, including characters who "read fluidly on the gender and sexuality spectrum." Vox called the series one of the "most LGBTQ-inclusive and diverse shows on television."

Entertainment Weekly's Darren Franich described the series as "a funny-wonderful pop fantasy animated like disco fireworks, fun for kids of all genders and any parents looking for something happy to cry about". Franich appreciated the self-aware humor and "hiply transgressive newness". Franich also noted some repetition, occasionally flat animation and the final showdown's predictable outcome. He found some of the tension in contemporary American politics reflected in the series' portrayal of the rebuilding of a "coalition of powerful liberal-minded thinkers left in disarray after a brutal defeat years ago by a monstrously all-consuming bad dude". Collider called the series "visually exciting, emotionally charged, and unexpectedly hilarious", and "one of the best new shows of the year". David Griffin at IGN praised the series for successfully rebooting the franchise but concluded that "Adora could have used more time with the Horde to help develop her character".

Hypable praised the series' diversity and the multifaceted relationships among some of its core characters, but found much of the first season's plot "simplistic", and the rotating cast of princesses given short shrift. The Washington Post highlighted the "top-notch" voice cast and particularly the work of Lorraine Toussaint as the sorceress Shadow Weaver. The Verge commented that the series' biggest problem was that it was "retreading territory that Steven Universe and the two Avatar animated series did better", with several characters and plot points heavily reminiscent of elements from these earlier animated series, and also criticized the early episodes' shallow plot. Tor.com's Maya Gittleman stated that the show not only "queers fantasy archetypes" but has a "deliberately inclusive, [and] diverse cast," works to highlight "different means of expressing power," and have room for "an expansive exploration of femininity." Gittleman further argued that the show operates further "outside the gender binary" than any show she knows of, that "Catradora has actually been canon for years" with the show focusing on a world where "the love of two queer girls gets to save the universe." In the end of her review, she says she would like to see more diverse "queer stories" in the years to come.

The second season has an 86% approval rating on Rotten Tomatoes, based on 14 reviews, with an average rating of 7.7/10. The site's critical consensus reads, "She-Ra and the Princesses of Power continues to go from strength to strength with ebullient flair in a second season that will enrapture younger fans while reminding adult viewers about the virtues of friendship and kindness."

The third season has a 100% approval rating on Rotten Tomatoes, based on 9 reviews, with an average rating of 8/10.

The fourth season has a 100% approval rating on Rotten Tomatoes, based on 13 reviews, with an average rating of 8.6/10.

The fifth and final season has a 94% approval rating on Rotten Tomatoes, based on 16 reviews, with an average rating of 9.2/10. Raina Deerwater of GLAAD stated that the center of the show is a "relationship between two women" (Adora and Catra), with the dynamic between them driving the entire series, comparing the show to Killing Eve while noting shows like The Legend of Korra, Adventure Time, and Steven Universe. The Mary Sue stated that the show's final season hammers home the message of love, compassion, and strength, even with an emphasis on forgiveness and allowing those who wish to be redeemed the space to change, like Steven Universe. Paper Magazine argued that the show was carrying the torch from Steven Universe and said that the show tackles various topics like identity, responsibility, "importance of chosen family," and being queer itself. The A.V. Club said that the sendoff of the series is satisfying, with Catra portrayed as a victim of trauma, with the message that nothing can overpower "the collective power of friendship, love, and solid storytelling." PinkNews called the final season "packed with big queer energy" while Digital Spy said that the kiss between Adora and Catra would change TV forever. Three reviewers for Autostraddle called the final season a "literally perfect season of television." Tracy Brown of the Los Angeles Times said that the show lets all kids, especially those who are queer, realize that "being honest about their feelings can make them a hero is as exciting as it is important." Emmet Asher-Perrin on Tor.com, in their review, argued that Catra has an inferiority complex like Loki in the Marvel Cinematic Universe films and the current incarnation of The Master in the Doctor Who series. A.H. Starlyng of the LA Times said that the show's final season is the best in the show, including a redemption arc for Catra, with Adora trying to help Catra become a better person.

=== Awards and nominations ===
Year	Award	Category	Nominee(s)	Result	Ref.
2019	Daytime Emmy Awards	Outstanding Casting for an Animated Series or Special	She-Ra and the Princesses of Power	Nominated	
2019	GLAAD Media Awards	Outstanding Kids & Family Program	She-Ra and the Princesses of Power	Nominated	
2019	Golden Trailer Awards	Best Animation/Family TV Spot	She-Ra and the Princesses of Power	Nominated	
2020	Annie Awards	Best Music – TV/Media	Sunna Wehrmeijer for "Beast Island"	Nominated	
2020	Critics' Choice Television Awards	Best Animated Series	She-Ra and the Princesses of Power	Nominated	
2020	Casting Society of America	Television – Animation	Ania O'Hare	Nominated	
2020	GLAAD Media Awards	Outstanding Kids & Family Programming	She-Ra and the Princesses of Power	Nominated	
2020	Daytime Emmy Awards	Outstanding Daytime Promotional Announcement - Network or Program	She-Ra and the Princesses of Power	Won	
2020	Autostraddle Gay Emmys	Outstanding Animated Series	She-Ra and the Princesses of Power	Won	
2020	Autostraddle Gay Emmys	Best TV Episode With LGBTQ+ Themes	"Heart Part 2"	Nominated	
2020	Autostraddle Gay Emmys	Fan Favorite Couple	Adora and Catra	Won	
2021	GLAAD Media Awards	Outstanding Kids & Family Programming	She-Ra and the Princesses of Power	Won	
2021	NAACP Image Awards	Outstanding Animated Series	She-Ra and the Princesses of Power	Nominated	
2021	Annie Awards	Best TV/Media – Children	"Heart (Part 2)"	Nominated	
2021	Annie Awards	Best Writing – TV/Media	ND Stevenson for "Heart (Part 2)"| ND Stevenson for "Heart (Part 2)"	Nominated	
2021	Hugo Awards	Best Dramatic Presentation, Short Form	"Heart (Parts 1 and 2)" (written by Josie Campbell and ND Stevenson; directed by Jen Bennett and Kiki Manrique)	Nominated	

=== Legacy and influence ===
When talking with Entertainment Weekly in May 2020, Stevenson said that he hoped that She-Ra would continue to pave the way, saying he hoped it will be easier to have "romances and relationships that are constant throughout the show" without it taking suspense out of the show itself. In a New York Times profile on July 21, 2020, climate activist Jamie Margolin said she watched all five seasons of the show over a three-day period, telling the interview, "I was like, I hate the real world. I want to live on Etheria".

Scholars have approached the series with different perspectives. Paul Thomas argued the series is monomythic and deploys this, while "queering normative understandings of heroic gender and sexuality," and providing an example for writers wanting to rehabilitate Joseph Campbell's monomyth for the "increasingly queer, feminist, and intersectional world". Diana Burgos argued that the series, like The Legend of Korra and Sailor Moon, provides a roadmap to audiences which are navigating through the "coded systems of gender and sexuality that poison their narratives." Burgos further stated that these three series urge audiences to claim their agency within "our collective unconscious and the liminal digital spaces of our social networks." Others noted that the series proved that LGBTQ representation "does not have to be direct or in your face", and that the series is a manifestation of "queer seriality" in streaming media.
