= Catra =

Fictional character in the She-Ra TV series

- Masters of the Universe character
- Catra in She-Ra and the Princesses of Power
- First appearance: The Story of She-Ra (1984)
- Created by: Larry DiTillio; Bob Forward
- Voiced by: Melendy Britt (1985); AJ Michalka (2018–2020); Juliet Donenfeld (2018–2020; Young)

In-universe information
- Gender: Female
- Significant others: Adora (girlfriend, 2018 series)

Catra is a fictional character in the toyline, and animated television series, She-Ra: Princess of Power (1985–86), which is part of the Masters of the Universe franchise. In the 2018 reboot, She-Ra and the Princesses of Power, Catra is one of the central antagonists for the first four seasons before becoming an ally to the heroes in its final season, and the love interest of Princess Adora.

In both animated series, Catra is a Force-Captain of Hordak's Evil Horde, a position previously held by Adora before she defected in the 2018 reboot. In the first series, Catra displays minor sorcery abilities, possessing a magical mask, which when slid over her face gives the ability to transform into a purple panther-like beast, also showing telepathic control over all cats; in the second series she has cat-like features of her own, including a tail, large furry ears, a mane, and claws.

== In She-Ra: Princess of Power (1985) ==
=== Fictional character biography ===
Catra's first appearance in animated media is as one of the Horde captains of Hordak in the 1985 He-Man and She-Ra feature film The Secret of the Sword. In Filmation's She-Ra: Princess of Power cartoon series, Hordak is the leader of the Evil Horde, with Catra as of one of his minions. In early proposals for the show, Catra was the main antagonist, but when the Princess of Power toyline was released, Mattel decided to tie in the Evil Horde characters to Princess of Power toyline, to better integrate it with the Masters of the Universe franchise.

When Adora is reconciled with her twin brother Adam, she leaves the Horde and is replaced by Catra as the Force-Captain. Several times, while serving Hordak, Catra strikes out on her own, showing that she does not need Hordak. This is quite evident when Catra betrays Hordak to Skeletor, in an attempt to overthrow him. Even though there are a few other female villains in The Horde, Catra does not get on that well with any of them, only working with them as a last resort. She appears to have a particularly intense rivalry with fellow female villain Scorpia. Along with the other Horde members, Catra holds an intense hatred for the character Imp.

Catra is in possession of a magical mask, given to her by Hordak, which he stole from the imprisoned Queen of the Magicats. The mask grants her the ability to transform into a large panther by sliding it from her forehead over her eyes. Once in her cat form, she retains the ability to speak and possesses greater strength than her human form. One of the most overlooked details about Catra is that she also possesses the power of teleportation. She only demonstrates this ability on one occasion and it is uncertain where this power originates, although it is assumed that it is another power bestowed by her magical mask. The Magicats also revealed one of the mask's powers to Catra called Freezefire, which generates an energy beam that can encase its target in ice, but Catra lost any knowledge of this power when her mind was wiped. Additionally, the Magicat Percival, states that once the mask has been used for evil, it can no longer be used for good.

==== Clawdeen ====
Catra is also the owner of a pink lion named Clawdeen. Clawdeen only appears once during the series' run. In that episode, she scares the rebels into the Cage-Mines so The Horde can capture them. Bow traps her in one of the Cage-Mines and she is never seen again.

In the Ladybird books, Clawdeen is female (despite having a mane) and only referred to as a giant cat. Nonetheless, she can talk and is Catra's mode of transportation. She also appears in the mini-comic "A Born Champion", but has a minor role.

== In She-Ra and the Princesses of Power (2018–2020) ==
In the 2018 series, Catra and Adora were adolescent childhood friends, raised together by their trainer/mother-figure, Shadow Weaver. Though Adora tried to defend Catra from Shadow Weaver's abuse throughout their childhood, Catra resented Adora for the favoritism shown to her by Shadow Weaver. Furthermore, unlike Adora, Catra was well aware of the Horde's manipulations and accepted them for the sake of her own ambitions and life with Adora. When Adora defects from the Horde, Catra rejects her former friend's attempt to talk her into leaving as well and takes her desertion personally. Stevenson explains: "Catra's feelings of betrayal towards Adora are personal. Adora's more idealistic, and she loves everyone in the world and wants to save everybody. Catra can't understand or accept that. That's the core tragedy, not just of the characters, but of the show." There are also hints of Adora and Catra harboring romantic feelings for each other throughout the series that play into Catra’s abandonment issues.

Catra seizes the opportunity to prove herself to the Horde and is quickly promoted to Force Captain by Lord Hordak. Although her plan to capture Adora fails, Catra is able to win the allegiance of the eccentric genius Princess Entrapta, providing the Horde with new technology for an attempted conquest of Etheria. Although that plan fails as well, Catra impresses Hordak enough to replace Shadow Weaver as his second in command.

During the second and third seasons, Hordak begins losing faith in Catra due to her arrogance and putting her personal grudges before the Horde's agenda. When Shadow Weaver is due to be exiled, she tricks Catra into providing the means for her to escape. As punishment for trying to hide her mistake, she is sent on a dangerous mission in the hazardous desert of the Crimson Waste. There she becomes the leader of a local band of bandits, and is tempted to abandon the Horde for her new life in the desert, but then returns to the Horde upon learning that Shadow Weaver has defected to the rebels - and, in her eyes, chosen Adora over her once again. Her resentful mindset drives her to willfully endanger Etheria after learning the risk of activating the experimental portal, driving her to incapacitate Entrapta and covering her tracks by exiling the princess to Beast Island and lying to Hordak that Entrapta betrayed them.

In the fourth season, Catra coerces Hordak into letting her command the Horde's war effort, and hires the shapeshifting mercenary Double Trouble to sow dissent in the Rebellion. But the Horde's victories leave Catra unsatisfied, as her obsession with proving herself drives off her few remaining friends. When Hordak learns the truth of Entrapta's exile from Double Trouble after they were bought by the Rebellion to sabotage the Horde, Catra immobilizes Hordak when he attacks her. Double Trouble then reveals they switched sides while giving Catra an analysis of her character flaws, causing her to emotionally break down and accept her defeat. At the end of the season, Catra is taken aboard the ship of Horde Prime, Hordak's creator, along with Glimmer, and manages to convince him to refrain from killing Glimmer and destroying Etheria in order to use it as a weapon.

At the start of the fifth and final season, Catra—effectively held prisoner on Horde Prime's ship as a “guest”—begins to question and experience regret for her past behavior. She tentatively bonds with Glimmer, her fellow “guest”, over their mutual connections with Adora. Catra's fear for Adora's safety leads her to sacrifice herself to help Glimmer escape, resulting in Horde Prime implanting her with a mind-hive chip. Her act of redemption encourages Glimmer, Adora, Bow, and Entrapta to in turn rescue Catra from Horde Prime's clutches. After her rescue, though retaining her cynical and abrasive personality, Catra joins Adora's group and helps them fight to liberate Etheria. In the series finale, Catra accompanies Adora to the Heart of Etheria; it is only after Catra professes her love for Adora and kisses her that the latter is able to free the magic of Etheria from Horde Prime's clutches.

== In popular culture ==
Catra appears in the Robot Chicken episode "Slaughterhouse on the Prairie", voiced by Eden Espinosa. She attacks Castle Bright Moon with Scorpia and Entrapta, only to be impaled on Scorpia's tail by She-Ra.

== Reception ==
Comic Book Resources listed the original incarnation of the character in He-Man: Eternia’s 15 Mightiest Villains.

Catra's lesbian relationship with Adora received positively reviews by critics, with many considering their dynamic "captivating" and "groundbreaking",,with LGBTQ+ media outlets such as GLAAD praising the storyline for queer representation in animation,. However, detractors argued that Adora's relationship with Catra is extremely toxic. While defenders of the arc and series creator ND Stevenson emphasized that Catra's behaviour was a direct manifestation of the child abuse and psychological conditioning she endured, critics against the pairing contended that Catra's actions throughout the first four seasons could not be resolved within a single season.
