= Entrapta =

Fictional character

- Masters of the Universe character
- Entrapta in the 2018 series
- First appearance: "A Born Champion" (Princess of Power minicomics; 1986)
- Created by: Tina Harris (writer)
- Voiced by: Linda Gary (1985); Christine Woods (2018)

In-universe information
- Species: Etherian
- Gender: Female
- Title: Princess of Dryl
- Occupation: Scientist
- Family: Unknown
- Significant other: Hordak (2018 series)

Entrapta is a fictional character who first appeared in the animated television series She-Ra: Princess of Power. She later reappeared in the reboot series, She-Ra and the Princesses of Power, with a bigger role and more character development than her original depiction, including a romantic relationship with Hordak.

== Media ==
=== Television ===
==== She-Ra: Princess of Power (1985) ====
In She-Ra: Princess of Power, Entrapta is the Horde's technician and a sidekick of Catra. Entrapta is a skilled inventor and is credited with designing advanced equipment for the Horde to employ in their battle against the Great Rebellion. Her specialty is devising traps and weaponry.

==== She-Ra and the Princesses of Power (2018-2020) ====
In She-Ra and the Princesses of Power, Entrapta is given an updated-origin storyline. Her hair is also purple, unlike in the original show where it was pink, and she is able to mentally control it at will as if it were another appendage, to manipulate it to fight enemies or to control her various machines.

Showrunner ND Stevenson later confirmed that Entrapta was written as autistic. Entrapta is portrayed in the series as a skilled but reckless inventor and princess of Dryl. She has great interest in studies of robotics, and despite many failed experiments, she became one of the most knowledgeable people on First Ones' tech in Etheria.

Entrapta quickly joins the Rebellion, though after a partially-botched rescue mission to the Fright Zone, she is nearly incinerated and left for dead by the other princesses. Convinced by Catra that she was abandoned by her friends on purpose, Entrapta is recruited into the Horde and she creates highly effective weaponry for them. Entrapta bonds with Hordak, the leader of the Horde, over their shared interest in technology while helping him build a portal to summon the rest of the Horde. Hordak reveals his nature as a defective clone to her, and due to Entrapta's love for imperfection, they form a genuine friendship that blossoms into romantic love. However, when Entrapta refuses to activate the portal upon learning it could destroy Etheria, she is knocked out by Catra and sent off to Beast Island while Hordak is made to believe that Entrapta betrayed him. Nonetheless, Entrapta is delighted by the ancient technology left on Beast Island. When Adora and Bow arrive to rescue Entrapta, she is reluctant to leave, due to both the island's resources and her feelings of abandonment. With that despondency in mind, Entrapta almost allows herself to be consumed by the aggressive vegetation of the island. However, when She-Ra tells Entrapta that leaving with them would allow her to examine their aircraft, an item of ancient technology, Entrapta agrees to help them escape and ends up rejoining the Rebellion. When the galactic Horde, led by Hordak's creator Horde Prime, arrives at Etheria, Entrapta proves to be instrumental in foiling his plan to use the planet's inner superweapon to destroy the universe. Hordak's love for Entrapta is shown to be strong enough that it inspires him to rebel against Horde Prime, and the two happily reunite after She-Ra disables the weapon and defeats Horde Prime.

According to Stevenson, Entrapta "sees humanity in everything" and had "lots of robot boyfriends and girlfriends", along with her relationship with the ship, Darla, in "some capacity".

=== In other media ===
Entrapta appears in the Robot Chicken episode "Slaughterhouse on the Prairie", voiced by Robin Tunney. She accompanies Catra and Scorpia into attacking Castle Bright Moon.

== Reception ==
Entrapta in She-Ra and the Princesses of Power received generally positive reception from critics. Erin Wilhelm of Bleeding Cool was critical of Entrapta, calling her a "dangerous villain", saying that her actions are not "consistent with science" and that she uses discovery and science "to justify her own selfish motivations." Tracy Brown contrasted this, arguing that Entrapta's "affinity for science separates her from most of the other characters on the show", and said that Entrapta sees a "kindred spirit" in Hordak, and stays with the Horde because they have "accepted and nurtured her scientific drive." She also quoted her voice actress as calling Entrapta an "insatiable workaholic" who has more than "genius level intelligence" but is not very "socially savvy" and Stevenson describes Entrapta as a character which has a "very deep need to be loved and accepted" but she wants people to "love her for who she is", and does not see the Horde and the Rebellion as on "opposite sides".

Brandon Zachary of CBR describes Entrapta as having a "surprisingly sweet relationship" with Hordak, her lab partner, and says that Entrapta is a "brilliant inventor" who brings out the humanity within Hordak. Vivian Kane of The Mary Sue says that unlike She-Ra: Princess of Power where Entrapta was "a full-on bad guy", she gets more character development in She-Ra and the Princesses of Power, serving as positive "representation for girls and women in STEM fields", while arguing that her story raises "issues of scientific ethics". Beth Elderkin of Gizmodo described Entrapta as a chaotic neutral character, more developed than in She-Ra: Princess of Power or later versions, who only cares "about the pursuit of knowledge" and often makes morally ambiguous choices. Elderkin also argued that Entrapta is "adorable...frustrating, and...so naive it's dangerous" as a villain who doesn't think she is a villain. Caitlin Chappell of CBR praised the series for "better represent[ing] the autistic community" and argued that Entrapta sees her imperfections, and those that others have, as "beautiful." She also said that Entrapta is a "wonderful role model" and a "strong character" who stays true to herself throughout the show.
