= She-Ra: Princess of Power =

American animated television series from 1985–1987

- Title card
- Genre: Action; Adventure; Sword and planet; Magical girl; Superhero
- Created by: Larry DiTillio; J. Michael Straczynski
- Directed by: Gwen Wetzler
- Voices of: Melendy Britt; George DiCenzo; Linda Gary; Erika Scheimer; Erik Gunden
- Ending theme: "I Have The Power" by Erika Scheimer and Noam Kaniel
- Composers: Shuki Levy; Haim Saban; Erika Lane
- Country of origin: United States
- Original language: English
- No. of seasons: 2
- No. of episodes: 93 (and one Christmas Special: "He-Man and She-Ra: A Christmas Special)" (list of episodes)

Production
- Executive producer: Lou Scheimer
- Production location: United States
- Running time: 24 minutes
- Production companies: Filmation Associates; Mattel

Original release
- Network: First-run syndication
- Release: September 9, 1985 – December 12, 1987

Related
- He-Man and the Masters of the Universe; She-Ra and the Princesses of Power

She-Ra: Princess of Power is an American animated series produced in 1985 by Filmation. A spin-off of Filmation's He-Man and the Masters of the Universe series, She-Ra was aimed primarily at a young female audience to complement He-Man's popularity with young males. Unlike He-Man, which was based on the Masters of the Universe toy line by Mattel, the creation of She-Ra was a collaboration between Filmation and Mattel. The initial group of characters and premise were created by uncredited writers Larry DiTillio and J. Michael Straczynski for Filmation, while the characters introduced later were designed by Mattel. Mattel provided financial backing for the series, as well as an accompanying toy line. The series premiered in 1985 and was ended in 1987, after 2 seasons and 93 episodes.

On March 22, 1985, several months before the release of the television series, Filmation released an animated film based on the series titled He-Man and She-Ra: The Secret of the Sword. The film is composed of what would be the first five episodes from the She-Ra television series: "Into Etheria", "Beast Island", "She-Ra Unchained", "Reunions" and "Battle for Bright Moon".

A rebooted series, She-Ra and the Princesses of Power, premiered on Netflix on November 13, 2018, and concluded on May 15, 2020.

== Plot ==
The series follows the adventures of Princess Adora, Prince Adam/He-Man's twin sister, who leads a group of freedom fighters known as the Great Rebellion in the fight to free most of Etheria from the tyrannical rule of Hordak and the Evil Horde. With her Sword of Protection, Adora can transform into She-Ra just as Prince Adam can transform into He-Man.

Born on the planet Eternia to Queen Marlena and King Randor, Princess Adora is kidnapped at birth by Hordak and taken to Etheria. There she serves as a mind-controlled Horde Force Captain before He-Man rescues her. After reuniting with her parents on Eternia, She-Ra decides to return to Etheria and lead the Great Rebellion. During this time, it was also revealed that Hordak was the teacher of He-Man's archenemy Skeletor.

== Main characters ==
=== The Great Rebellion ===
Character	Notes
Princess Adora / She-Ra	The title character and Prince Adam's twin sister called the Princess of Power. Formerly Force Captain of the Horde, she is now one of the leaders of the Great Rebellion.
Spirit / Swift Wind	She-Ra's talking steed who transforms into a winged unicorn. He's a brave, honorable being.
Light Hope	The guardian of the Crystal Castle who typically takes the form of a pillar of light. He is the wisest being on Etheria and is the one that She-Ra typically seeks for advice.
Madame Razz	An absent-minded Twigget witch who serves as an adviser to the rebels. She provides comic relief in the series. She is one of the few people on Etheria who know that Adora is She-Ra.
Broom	An anthropomorphic broom who is Madame Razz's companion and mode of transportation. It is shown in one episode (where Adora's grandfather visits) that Broom, as well as Madame Razz, also knows that Adora is She-Ra because she transforms right in front of both of them.
Kowl	A flying creature who appears to be a cross between a koala and an owl. Snarky and sharp-witted, he is one of the few inhabitants of Etheria who knows that Adora is She-Ra.
Bow	An archer and friend to She-Ra. He is a cultured gentleman who exhibits insecurities. Bow has a crush on She-Ra, but does not know her true identity. He is one of the longest-serving members of the Great Rebellion.
Princess Glimmer	Princess of Bright Moon and former leader of the Great Rebellion before stepping down in favor of Adora. Despite being the former leader of The Rebellion, she is naive and at times gullible. She possesses light-based magical powers.
Queen Angella	The magical winged Queen of Bright Moon, Glimmer's mother, and one of the most powerful magic wielders on Etheria, along with Shadow Weaver and Castaspella. She's renowned for her wisdom and sense of justice.
Castaspella	Queen of Mystacor as well as a powerful sorceress. She loves parties and has a mischievous streak.
Frosta	A member of the Great Rebellion with vast cold-related powers. She is also the Ice Empress of Castle Chill in the Kingdom of Snows. Frosta is blunt, direct and opinionated, not afraid to speak her mind.
Netossa	A member of the Great Rebellion who wears a cape that doubles as a net for capturing her foes.
Perfuma	A powerful ecomancer. Perfuma is cheerful and bubbly, but is also somewhat scatterbrained.
Peekablue	A reluctant member of the Great Rebellion whose peacock-like tail feathers give her the power of "multi-vision".
Flutterina	A member of the Great Rebellion with butterfly wings.
Spinnerella	Netossa's best friend. She has the ability to spin rapidly while dancing, creating a whirlwind.
Sweet-Bee	A humanoid scout with bee-like wings and member of an alien race seeking a new planet to inhabit.
Princess Mermista	A mermaid princess who joins the Great Rebellion. She is somewhat flirtatious.
Sea Hawk	A pirate who joins the Rebellion. He is Adora's significant other and enjoys fighting alongside her in the Great Rebellion, while not knowing her Identity as She-Ra. In contrast to Bow, Sea Hawk is rugged, confident and somewhat uncouth.
Spritina	A Twigget similar to Madame Razz, Sprocker and Sprag.
Sprag	A Twigget similar to Madame Razz, Spritina and Sprocker.
Sprocker	A Twigget similar to Madame Razz, Spritina and Sprag.
Sprint	A Twigget.
Loo-Kee	A small Etherian creature called a Kon-Seal, who hides in the background somewhere in nearly every episode for viewers to spot, and shows himself in the end of the episode to relate the moral of the story. He gets directly involved in the plot of two episodes. While a somewhat neutral character, he seems to sympathize with the Rebellion.

=== The Evil Horde ===
Character	Notes
Hordak	The tyrannical cyborg ruler of Etheria and teacher of Skeletor. He is notoriously short-tempered and at times abuses his minions like sending them down a trap door. Despite being evil, Hordak has a sense of humor.
Shadow Weaver	The Horde's powerful sorceress whose face is obscured in the shadow of her hooded cloak. She was once a friend of Castaspella before joining the Horde.
Catra	The current Force Captain of the Evil Horde who can transform into a purple panther. Like Hordak, Catra is short-tempered. She feigns loyalty to Hordak and is generally untrustworthy, typically acting in her own self-interest. She has a longstanding rivalry with her teammate Scorpia, whom she despises.
Mantenna	An insectoid member of the Horde, whose bulging eyes can extend from their sockets and fire energy beams. He functions mainly as comic relief. Sometimes cowardly and inept, Mantenna has also shown moments of brilliance.
Leech	A master of power suction, his cups capable of draining life force or firmly adhering to surfaces.
Grizzlor	A beast-like member of the Horde. Unlike Mantenna, he is not particularly smart.
Modulok	A red-skinned mad scientist who can reassemble his body parts to take on different shapes. He was originally a scientist from Eternia that fought He-Man and used to work for Skeletor.
Multi-Bot	A two-headed, four-armed robot created by Modulok.
Horde Prime	The tyrannical ruler of the galaxy and is implied to be Hordak's brother since Prince Zed called Hordak his uncle. His face is perpetually concealed by smoke.
Scorpia	A humanoid with the tail and claws of a scorpion. She has a longstanding rivalry with her teammate Catra, whom she despises. Much like Catra, she's untrustworthy, often acting in her own self-interest.
Entrapta	An aloof scientist and master of traps, she has long magical hair she can use to ensnare her enemies.
Imp	A shape-shifting spy who can disguise himself as everyday objects. He is Hordak's favorite member of the Horde which engenders jealousy from other members of the Horde.
Octavia	An octopus-like humanoid with four tentacles.
Rattlor	Excitable rattlesnake-like villain with extending neck and a long tail.
Tung Lashor	Excitable python-like villain with extending tongue.
Dylamug	Strange robotic leader of the Horde Troopers.
Colonel Blast	Horde trooper commander with numerous built-in laser blasters.
Vultak	Flying vulture-like master of the Horde Zoo. He's shown to be exceptionally cruel to the animals under his charge.
Horde Troopers	Mechanical soldiers that serve the Horde Empire.
Claudina	This character is Catra's pet oversized pink cat.
Dragster	This character has a wheel in his abdomen and a face mask.

== Episodes ==
The first season of the series ran five days a week, like He-Man. The second season aired Saturday mornings. She-Ra ended in 1987, and the character was not mentioned in the two subsequent He-Man animated series.

Season	Episodes	Originally released	
Season	Episodes	First released	Last released
1	65	September 9, 1985	December 6, 1985
Special		December 25, 1985	
2	28	September 13, 1986	December 12, 1987

== Cast ==
Voice actor	Characters
Melendy Britt	Princess Adora / She-Ra, Catra, Castaspella, Mermista, Jewelstar, Octavia, Queen Hunga, Koo, Additional voices
George DiCenzo	Hordak, Bow, General Sunder, Sea Hawk, Red Knight, Duke Dreer, Dylamug, Snout Spout, Vultak, Tung Lashor, Admiral Scurvy, False Face, Inspector Darkney, Stonedar, Additional voices
Linda Gary	Glimmer, Shadow Weaver, Madame Razz, Scorpia, Entrapta, Sweet-Bee, Tallstar, Teela, Sorceress of Castle Grayskull, Additional voices
Erika Scheimer	Queen Angella, Flutterina, Frosta, Imp, Starla, Peekablue, Perfuma, Loo-Kee, Huntara, Spritina, Granita, Additional voices
Erik Gunden	Kowl, Mantenna, Leech, Horde Troopers, Horde Prime, Spirit / Swift Wind, Light Hope, Broom, Grizzlor, Modulok, Multi-Bot, Orko, Rattlor, Sprag, Sorrowful, Sprocker, King Miro, Rokkon, Additional voices
Diane Pershing	Netossa, Spinnerella, Additional voices
John Erwin	He-Man / Prince Adam, Beast Man, Granamyr, Webstor, Additional voices
Alan Oppenheimer	Skeletor, Cringer / Battle Cat, Man-At-Arms, Spyster, Additional voices

== Comparison list ==
Many of the characters/locations/vehicles in the Princess of Power toyline share similarities to the pre-existing Masters of the Universe characters. Comparing She-Ra (left) with He-Man (right):

Characters

- Adora/She-Ra = Prince Adam/He-Man
- Spirit/Swift Wind = Cringer/Battle Cat
- Catra = Panthor
- Grizzlor = Beast Man
- Hordak = Skeletor
- Bow = Man-At-Arms
- Kowl = Orko
- Sweet Bee = Buzz-Off
- Double Trouble = Man-E-Faces
- Glimmer = Teela
- Sorrowful = Granamyr
- Leech = Whiplash
- Spinerella = Sy-Klone
- Shadow Weaver = Evil-Lyn
- Scorpia = Clawful
- Madame Razz = Orko
- Light Hope = The Sorceress

Elements "For the honour of Grayskull!","I am She-ra!" = *"By the power of Grayskull!","I have the power!"

- Etheria = Eternia
- The Crystal Castle = Castle Grayskull
- The Fright Zone = Snake Mountain
- The Sword of Protection = The Sword of Power

== Syndication ==
Reruns aired on USA Network from September 1988 to September 1989, and on Qubo Night Owl from September 27, 2010, to August 25, 2013. In 2010, Retro TV began airing reruns. Reruns have also aired on Me-TV, as well as Teletoon Retro in Canada.

== Toys ==
The female She-Ra characters were released in the 1980s as part of the Princess of Power toy line, while The Evil Horde were incorporated into Masters of the Universe. In the 2000s, an exclusive She-Ra toy was released for the MOTU 200X line. The later Masters of the Universe Classics toy line features characters from the entire franchise, including new action figures from the She-Ra cartoon series.

== Other media ==
In the DC Comics series Masters of the Universe, the title "Masters of the Universe #8" is a one-shot about She-Ra. Adora/Despara/She-ra continues to be a main character through many of the remaining chapters/installments of the series, including in its conclusion. The entire series is collected in a hardcover omnibus.

== Home releases ==
The most sought after set by collectors due to its 4X6 collectible art cards and extensive bonus features is the BCI Eclipse LLC (under its Ink & Paint classic animation entertainment brand) (under license from Entertainment Rights) released all 93 episodes of She-Ra: Princess of Power in 3 volumes on DVD (Region 1) in 2006–2007. Each episode on BCI Ink & Paint's DVD releases of She-Ra, Princess of Power was uncut, un-edited, digitally remastered and fully restored for optimum audio and video quality and presented in story continuity order. Each volume contains special features including different 4X6 collectible art cards, documentaries, character profiles, commentaries, retrospective interviews, storyboards, DVD-ROM pdf scripts, trivia, and photo galleries. In 2009, the releases were discontinued when BCI Eclipse ceased operations.

On May 31, 2010, Classic Media announced plans to re-release the series on DVD (Region 1). On September 28, 2010, they released Season 1, Volume 1 as a 2-disc set featuring 20 episodes. On January 24, 2011, Classic Media released She-Ra: The Princess of Power - The Complete Series.

On October 19, 2009, Universal Pictures UK (under license from Classic Media) released Season 1, Volume 1 in the UK, exclusively through retailer HMV. In early 2010, other retailers, such as Amazon.co.uk, also began selling the series as a box set.

Madman Entertainment released the entire series on DVD (Region 4) in Australia, both in 3 volumes (similar to BCI Eclipse releases) and as a complete series set.

Universal Pictures Home Entertainment released all 93 episodes of the original 1985 series of She-Ra: Princess of Power on DVD in Region 1 on October 1, 2019. This release includes He-Man & She-Ra: The Secret of the Sword and He-Man & She-Ra: A Christmas Special.

DVD name	Ep#	Release dates	
DVD name	Ep#	Region 1	Region 4
Season 1, Volume 1	33	November 7, 2006 (BCI)	March 15, 2007
Season 1, Volume 2	32	April 3, 2007 (BCI)	August 16, 2007
Season 2	28	September 4, 2007 (BCI)	December 5, 2007
The Complete Series	93	January 24, 2011	June 24, 2009

== Reboot ==
On December 12, 2017, DreamWorks Animation SKG and Netflix announced a new reboot series based on She-Ra was announced within DreamWorks Animation Television. The series is executive produced by award-winning author, ND Stevenson (creator of Nimona and Lumberjanes). On May 18, 2018, new voice actors and the official title were revealed. It was released on November 13, 2018. The reboot series is separate from the continuity of the original Masters of the Universe series, and is noted for its explicit LGBT representation.

== Live-action series ==
On September 13, 2021, Amazon announced that a live action She-Ra series is in development with DreamWorks Animation serving as an executive producer as the series will be a new, standalone story and will not be connected to the animated show. It was announced that Nicole Kassell will direct the series. Heidi Schreck joined the series as writer and executive-producer by October 2024.
