= Scorpia (Princesses of Power) =

Fictional character from the Masters of the Universe franchise

- Princesses of Power character
- First appearance: The Secret of the Sword (1985)
- Created by: Larry DiTillio; Bob Forward
- Voiced by: Linda Gary (1985); Lauren Ash (2018–2020)

In-universe information
- Species: Scorpioni
- Gender: Female
- Title(s): Princess; Sting Horde Enforcer

Scorpia is a fictional character in the animated television series She-Ra: Princess of Power and She-Ra and the Princesses of Power. She is a member of The Horde. She appears to be part-human, part-scorpion. Instead of hands, she possesses scorpion-like claws, which she uses to great effect when fighting with members of the Great Rebellion.

== Media ==
=== Television ===
==== She-Ra: Princess of Power (1985) ====
Scorpia is a member of the Horde, who lives in the Crimson Waste. At Crimson Waste, she owns slaves, which suggests that she is a powerful figure on Etheria. At Crimson Waste, Scorpia's home is shaped like a huge scorpion. Within the home can be seen a throne, suggesting Scorpia has some kind of rule over a region of Etheria. Scorpia and Catra possess a fierce rivalry between them, only working together as a last resort. She possesses claw-like pincers instead of hands and a powerful tail which she can employ to capture members of the Rebellion. Her tail is at times a disadvantage to her as She-Ra uses it several times to hurl her out of the way. She is not the most intelligent member of the Horde and is easily fooled, which is evidenced on several occasions, most notably when she allows Bow to enter the secret factory of the Horde believing him to be a handsome inspector.

Scorpia is also the owner of the Crawler, a scorpion-shaped tank. One of the powers which the tank possesses is the ability to fire a sleep ray from its tail.

==== She-Ra and the Princesses of Power (2018–2020) ====
In the rebooted series, Scorpia is a Force Captain in the Horde, of nominally equal rank to Catra. Nonetheless, she usually winds up as Catra's sidekick in her attempts to get revenge on Adora or advance the Horde's agenda. However, unlike in the original series, Scorpia is not malevolent at all. She is also one of the Princesses of Power; however, her family, the original rulers of the Fright Zone, capitulated to Hordak and surrendered their Black Garnet runestone to him. Scorpia thus spends most of the series as a faithful member of the Horde.

As the series progresses, Scorpia became good friends with Entrapta while having romantic feelings towards Catra in wanting to help her while constantly making excuses for Catra's abusive behavior. Eventually, after standing by as Entrapta was sent to Beast Island during the 3rd season, Scorpia leaves the Horde after accepting Catra to be increasingly unstable and seeks the alliance's help in rescuing Entrapta. As a result, Scorpia ends up joining the Rebellion and established a connection to the Black Garnet, gaining electrical powers. She is romantically linked to Perfuma.

== Other media ==
Scorpia appears in the Robot Chicken episode "Slaughterhouse on the Prairie", voiced by Eden Espinosa. She accompanies Catra and Entrapta into attacking Castle Bright Moon only for She-Ra to cut off her scorpion tail (which She-Ra used on Catra) and kill her.

== Reception ==
The rebooted version of Scorpia has received very positive reviews from critics and audiences alike.
