= Ninjor =

Ninjor may refer to:

- Ninjor (Power Rangers), fictional character from the Power Rangers franchise
- Ninjor (Masters of the Universe), fictional character from the Masters of the Universe franchise
