= Evil-Lyn =

Fictional supervillainess in the Masters of the Universe

- Masters of the Universe character
- Evil-Lyn as seen in Filmation series
- Created by: Mattel
- Voiced by: Linda Gary (He-Man and the Masters of the Universe); Kathleen Barr (He-Man and the Masters of the Universe (2002)); Lena Headey (Masters of the Universe: Revelation); Grey Griffin (He-Man and the Masters of the Universe (2021)); Tiffany Smith (Masters of the Universe: Tale of Eternia)
- Portrayed by: Meg Foster (1987 film); Alison Brie (2026 film)

In-universe information
- Alias: Evelyn
- Species: Eternian (witch)
- Gender: Female
- Title: Evil Warrior Goddess
- Family: The Faceless One (father, 2002 reboot); No family information provided in the original Filmation series Hordak (father, 2021 reboot)

Evil-Lyn is a supervillainess in the Masters of the Universe toy line and the accompanying cartoon series He-Man and the Masters of the Universe.

She is an evil witch who aids Skeletor as his second-in-command with her powers of darkness. She is vastly more intelligent than Skeletor's other minions, and while she admits that she is not as powerful as Skeletor, she readily confesses that she hopes to seize her master's powers and rule over Eternia herself one day. Thus, she has worked completely independently of Skeletor on multiple occasions. Her trademark is the magic wand crowned with a crystal orb, but Evil-Lyn typically generates magic without the assistance of any instruments.

== Character history ==
=== Action figure ===
Evil-Lyn was introduced into the Masters of the Universe toyline in 1983 in order to add a female character to the Evil Warriors. Envisioned as an evil warrior-goddess and counterpart to Teela, Evil-Lyn's action figure is identical to Teela's except in color scheme, head mold, and accessories. The original figure has bright yellow skin.

=== 1980s Filmation cartoon ===
With her intelligence, fearlessness, and her incredible magic skills, Skeletor clearly could not hope for a more capable ally than Evil-Lyn, who is often left in charge when he is away from Snake Mountain. Voice actress Linda Gary imbued Evil-Lyn with the qualities of perniciousness and refinement simultaneously, and indeed, whatever the character did, she did it with style, unlike the vast majority of the other villains. Although the toy line may have designed her as an evil counterpart to Teela, in the cartoon, she was really more of an evil counterpart to the Sorceress, seeing as how she possessed no warrior skills whatsoever (while more than compensated for this via her expertise in magic and witchcraft). When her helmet is off, she is revealed to have white or grey hair.

She would use all manner of magic spells in combat against the Heroic Warriors, and duped many people with her magical disguises in episodes such as The Shaping Staff, The Curse of the Spellstone, Evil-Lyn's Plot and The Royal Cousin. Although occasionally using such artifacts as the legendary Shaping Staff and the Spellstone to supplement her powers, she was by no means reliant on external objects to perform her spells and enchantments. More often than not, her powers emanated from within her.

She frequently branched out from Skeletor's service and conducted her own schemes, as portrayed in episodes such as Ordeal in the Darklands Journey to Stone City and No Job Too Small also depict her working away from Skeletor. Additionally, Evil-Lyn renders her services to aid other super villains, such as Gorgon in The Defection, and Dark-Dream in Eternal Darkness, hence, affirming, time and again, that she is by no means devoted to Skeletor.

This is brought to the forefront in the episode The Witch and the Warrior, perhaps the most in-depth character study of Evil-Lyn in the series, in which she is forced into making an uneasy alliance with Teela when the two of them are stranded in the desert together. Having always held Teela in utter contempt, and never having regarded her as a formidable adversary (unlike He-Man and the Sorceress), Evil-Lyn acquires a degree of respect for Teela's skills and intelligence, going so far as to say that she and Teela could "make a great team" after all. She also declares to Teela in this episode that she has "no loyalty to Skeletor", and that she only works for him because she eventually hopes to acquire his superior powers. At the end of the episode, Evil-Lyn evinces shades of goodness as she thanks Mallek the Wizard of Stone Mountain for saving her life and healing her injuries. As a token of her heartfelt gratitude, she refuses to steal that which Skeletor had sent her to obtain, and proves that she is not subservient like the other Evil Warriors, stating that Skeletor can "come get" what he wanted "himself".

Although her background is never mentioned in the series, the series bible explains she was once a scientist from Earth called Evelyn Powers, who was on board Marlena Glenn's spacecraft before it crash-landed on Eternia. Evelyn had been insanely jealous of Marlena for being chosen over her to pilot the shuttle. When the ship crashed as the result of an explosion from Skeletor's homeworld of Infinita, Evelyn wound up on Infinita, where the evil powers of that world turned her knowledge of science into sorcery to aid Skeletor. This origin is used in a storybook entitled New Champions of Eternia but was unpopular with the show's writers and therefore never alluded to in the cartoon.

=== Masters of the Universe (1987) ===
Meg Foster as Evil-Lyn in the live-action Masters of the Universe

Evil-Lyn features in the 1987 live-action feature film Masters of the Universe. Played by Meg Foster, she is shown as Skeletor's right-hand woman as in the cartoon, although the film adds an extra dimension to her relationship with Skeletor by indicating some amount of romance between the two. In one scene, Skeletor reveals that he depends upon Evil-Lyn to portray the image of him as a ruler to the people of Eternia as he strokes her face and shoulder. While sharing the desire for power between them, Evil-Lyn's calm and seductive approach is shown to soothe Skeletor's wrath and mania in his moments of hysteria. In that same scene, they were about to kiss when Beast Man and the other warriors walked in and interrupted them.

Any attempt Evil-Lyn makes to stand closer or equal to Skeletor is quickly deflected by him in the film. After Skeletor kills Saurod for failing to capture He-Man and the Cosmic Key, Evil-Lyn tries to convince Skeletor that their talents could still be useful. This stance prompts Skeletor to force her into control of his troops on their second mission to Earth to track down the heroes. She succeeds in capturing the Cosmic Key, but Skeletor once again disregards her when she reports that she has failed to deal with He-Man.

In the final stages of the film, she deserts Skeletor after he absorbs the power of the universe without sharing it with her. This remains consistent with the various portrayals of the character as scheming and willing to turn on Skeletor from the mini-comics, Filmation series, and 2002 series. Evil-Lyn is not depicted as a powerful magic-wielder in the film (although it is not explicitly stated that she does not have such powers either) and does not carry her distinctive orb-staff. In the film, she rarely uses magic, although in one scene she casts an illusion to make herself appear to be the dead mother of Julie and also uses her powers to keep the door of the music store closed while Julie brings her the Cosmic Key. Describing her character, Foster said that Evil-Lyn is not villainous, "she is just doing her job and she knows how to get results, even if it means being harsh." Langella agreed, calling Evil-Lyn a female more dedicated to Skeletor's cause than any man; she is obsessive around Skeletor because she is slightly lovelorn. The filmmakers considered having Foster wear eye-lenses to mask her naturally pale-blue eyes, but decided that her natural eyes fit the character better. However, they did augment Foster's chest, fitting cleavage into the character's costume. Foster wanted the character to have a large hairstyle, rather than the short style featured in the film.

=== 2002 series ===
Evil-Lyn returns for the 2002 relaunch of the Masters of the Universe toy line and cartoon series. While her portrayal in the new show is very much in keeping with the original series, her background is expanded in the new series. She is revealed to be the daughter of a mysterious sorcerer known only as the Faceless One, who lives in isolation amongst the ruins of Zalesia and is the guardian of a precious object called the Ram Stone. The Faceless One disapproves of his daughter using her talent in the service of evil, particularly Skeletor's, although he hopes that someday she will learn the error of her ways. The episode "Lessons" indicates that she still feels a familial bond with her father when she returns the Ram Stone to him after it was used by Skeletor in an attempt to breach Castle Grayskull.

The show's second season expands considerably on the theme of her disloyalty to Skeletor. Unbeknownst to Skeletor, Evil-Lyn forms a secret alliance with Kobra Khan to free King Hiss and the Snake Men, whom she believes will grant her greater power than Skeletor. After the release of the Snake Men, Skeletor seeks to punish her by banishing her to the Forsaken Realm in the episode "The Price of Deceit". This episode features a flashback to the time she first met Skeletor when he was still Keldor. The young Evil-Lyn had managed to impress Keldor with her great skill and power, and played a part in saving his life. After his injury at the hands of King Randor, she took him to the altar of Hordak, who gave him new life by turning him into Skeletor. After the transformation, Skeletor became more and more twisted and evil, ending the love between him and Evil-Lyn and inspiring Evil-Lyn to overcome him rather than work alongside him. This episode also indicates that there are sparks of the good left within her as she considers defecting to the side of good after He-Man saves her life following a call for help from her father.

Later, in the episode "The Power of Grayskull", Evil-Lyn learns that Skeletor promised to free Hordak from the dimension of Despondos in return for Hordak saving his life, but Skeletor chose instead to destroy Hordak's sanctuary, knowing that Hordak could easily destroy him. She, therefore, chooses to free Hordak by herself, in order to gain the power that she needs, and once again concocts a scheme behind Skeletor's back, allying with Count Marzo in the episode "History" to free Hordak from Despondos. Failing in her scheme, she vows to continue until she has freed Hordak. This plot was going to be expanded in the show's third season, but the cartoon was cancelled before any further episodes could be produced.

=== He-Man and the Masters of the Universe (2012) ===
Evil-Lyn is with Skeletor when the evil group uses time travel to get the Skull of Power and Sir Laser-Lot, thereby allowing him to reshape Eternia and erasing Adam's memories as He-Man.

=== He-Man Reboot ===
Evil-Lyn appears in the 2026 live-action He-Man film Masters of the Universe, portrayed by Alison Brie.

=== Masters of the Universe: Revelation ===
In Masters of the Universe: Revelation, Evil-Lyn supplants Skeletor as leader of his armies following his apparent death, bringing peace to Eternia. After unknowingly freeing him and He-Man from their prisons, leading Skeletor to gain the Sword of Power, Evil-Lyn initially decides to begin serving him again and resume their romantic relationship, becoming the new Sorceress of Castle Grayskull. Evil-Lyn's backstory is also explored: born to poverty and almost cannibalised by her parents as a youth before being recruited by Skeletor as an adult to lead his armies, learning magic and falling in love with him. After being shown the true size of the universe by Skeletor, Evil-Lyn is disillusioned by its emptiness and elects to destroy it, tricking Skeletor into relinquishing his power in order to have sex with her before taking the sword's power as Dark-Lyn and destroying the heaven of Preternia, subsequently witnessing the death of God at the beginning of time. After facing off against Teela after she takes her place as Sorceress, Evil-Lyn is convinced to relinquish her power, before preventing a newly resurrected Orko from being called back to his afterlife.

== Four Horsemen Studios ==
At the 2006 Comic-Con International in San Diego, Four Horsemen Studios offered an exclusive mini statue of Evil-Lyn, as part of the line that serves as a continuation of the discontinued 2002 Mattel action figures. The mini statue was painted in traditional blue and yellow colors. The statue was also released in Series 5 of the ministatue line in 2007, in the new purple color scheme.

== Reception ==
Comic Book Resources list the character as part of He-Man: 15 Most Powerful Masters of the Universe.

== Bibliography ==
- "Masters of the Universe". SFX (240). Future plc: 82–85. November 2013.
