= List of He-Man and the Masters of the Universe characters =

Group of fictional characters

The Masters of the Universe franchise, created in 1981 as a toyline by American company Mattel, contained many characters in its various iterations as a toyline, the television series He-Man and the Masters of the Universe, a German series of audioplays, The New Adventures of He-Man, He-Man and the Masters of the Universe (2002), Masters of the Universe: Revelation and He-Man and the Masters of the Universe (2021) and the films The Secret of the Sword, He-Man & She-Ra: A Christmas Special, Masters of the Universe (1987), and Masters of the Universe (2026).

== Overview ==
Character	Voiced by	He-Man and the Masters of the Universe					The New Adventures of He-Man	He-Man and the Masters of the Universe (2002)		Masters of the Universe: Revelation	He-Man and the Masters of the Universe (2021)
Character	Voiced by	Season 1	Season 2	He-Man and She-Ra: The Secret of the Sword	He-Man & She-Ra: A Christmas Special	The Curse of the Three Terrors	The New Adventures of He-Man	Season 1	Season 2	Masters of the Universe: Revelation	He-Man and the Masters of the Universe (2021)
Character	Voiced by	Heroic Warriors									
He-Man Prince Adam	John Erwin Douglas Parker and Garry Chalk Cam Clarke Chris Wood Yuri Lowenthal	Main	Main	Main	Main	Main	Main	Main	Main	Guest	Main
Battle Cat Cringer	Alan Oppenheimer Stephen Root David Kaye	Main	Main	Guest	Guest	Main		Main	Main	Main	Main
Man-At-Arms Duncan	Alan Oppenheimer Garry Chalk Liam Cunningham Antony Del Rio	Main	Main	Main	Main	Main		Main	Main	Guest	Main
Teela	Linda Gary Cathy Weseluck Lisa Ann Beley Sarah Michelle Gellar Kimberly Brooks	Main	Main	Guest			Guest	Main	Main	Main	Main
Sorceress of Castle Grayskull	Linda Gary Venus Terzo Nicole Oliver Susan Eisenberg Kimberly Brooks	Main	Main	Main	Main	Main		Main	Main	Main	Main
Man E Faces Perkaedo	Lou Scheimer Paul Dobson Stephen Fry	Main	Main	Main	Main	Main		Main	Main		Main
King Randor	Lou Scheimer Michael Donovan Diedrich Bader Fred Tatasciore	Main	Main	Guest	Guest		Guest	Main	Main	Guest	Main
Orko	Lou Scheimer Gabe Khouth Griffin Newman Tom Kenny	Main	Main	Guest	Main	Guest				Guest	Main
She-Ra Princess Adora	Melendy Britt			Main	Main						
Mara of Primus Galactic Guardian	Venus Terzo						Main				
King Grayskull Sword of Power	Cam Clarke Alan Oppenheimer							Main	Main		Guest
Moss Man Kreann’Ot N’Norosh	Lou Scheimer John Payne Alan Oppenheimer		Guest		Guest			Main	Guest		
Roboto	Alan Oppenheimer Michael Donovan Justin Long		Guest						Recurring	Main	
Zodac	Lou Scheimer Christopher Judge	Guest							Main	Recurring	
He-Ro Gray Ro	Phil LaMarr									Main	
Evil Warriors
Skeletor Prince Keldor	Alan Oppenheimer Campbell Lane Brian Dobson Mark Hamill Benjamin Diskin	Main	Main	Main	Main	Main	Main	Main	Main	Guest	Main
Beast Man Raqquill Rqazz	John Erwin Scott McNeil Kevin Michael Richardson Trevor Devall	Main	Main	Main	Main	Main			Main	Main	Main
Evil-Lyn	Linda Gary Kathleen Barr Lena Headey Grey Griffin	Main	Main	Main	Main	Main			Main	Main	Main
Tri-Klops	Lou Scheimer	Main	Main	Main	Main	Main			Main	Main	Main
Mer-Man	Alan Oppenheimer	Main	Main	Main	Main	Main		Main	Main		
Trap-Jaw	Lou Scheimer	Main	Main	Main	Main	Main			Main	Main	Main
Kobra Khan		Main	Main	Main	Main	Main			Main	Main	Main
Clawful	Lou Scheimer Scott McNeil		Main	Main	Main	Main		Main	Main		
Stinkor Odiphus	Brian Drummond Jason Mewes							Main	Main	Main	
The Horde
Hordak	George DiCenzo			Main	Main						
Catra	Melendy Britt			Main	Main						
Shadow Weaver Light Spinner	Linda Gary Lorraine Toussaint			Main	Main						
Imp	Erika Scheimer			Guest	Main						
Grizzlor	Lou Scheimer			Main							
Leech	Lou Scheimer			Main							
Mantenna				Main							
Horde Prime	Lou Scheimer Keston John			Main							
Scorpia	Linda Gary Lauren Ash			Main							
The Snake Men
King Hiss King Hsssss	Brian Dobson							Main	Main		

== Heroic Warriors ==
=== Vintage toyline characters (1982–1988) ===
All of these characters were released in the vintage Mattel toyline.

==== Battle Cat / Cringer ====
Battle Cat is He-Man's faithful feline companion, an armored green tiger who carries him into battle. When He-Man is in the form of Prince Adam, Battle Cat is Cringer, the royal pet. Both Cringer and Battle Cat are green with orange stripes, but Battle Cat is much larger and more muscular. In the original 1980s series, Cringer speaks and is afraid of just about everything, hence the name.

In The Toys That Made Us, then-marketing VP of Mattel Paul Cleveland recounts the story that while the decision was made for He-Man to have some sort of vehicle, they no longer had the budget to be able to produce one; the decision was then made to repurpose a tiger from the Big Jim toy line. The tiger was not the same scale as the He-Man figure, and compared to He-Man, was about the size of a horse. Cleveland, however, insisted it to be used, even after artist Tony Guerrero made a green version in an attempt to discourage Cleveland, who instead approved of the color change and suggested putting a saddle on it, which resulted in Battle Cat's final design.

The Masters of the Universe Classics toyline stated that Cringer was part of the Green Tiger Tribe who was saved from a Para-Nekk by a younger Prince Adam and became his devoted companion.

Battle Cat also appears in the tower defense game Bloons TD 6 as a power which can only be obtained in a bundle or in a quest by the name of "By the Power of Battle Cat!"

Cringer and Battle Cat are voiced by Alan Oppenheimer in the 1980s series, Stephen Root in Masters of the Universe: Revelation, David Kaye in the 2021 series and Tom Wilton in the 2026 film. In the 2026 film, Cringer/Battle Cat replaces Leo the Lion in the Metro-Goldwyn-Mayer pictures logo using Leo’s trademark roar tracks.

==== Buzz-Off ====
Buzz-Off is a humanoid bee, established in the Filmation series as the leader of a tribe of Bee People. The 2002 series develops this further, giving Buzz-Off's people a name—the Andreenids—and establishing Buzz-Off as the captain of the defense force of their kingdom of Andreenos, in the Mystic Mountains. He is considered a newcomer to the Masters of the Universe by Ram Man and, while loyal to the defenders of Eternia, is equally loyal to his Queen, at times using his free time to fetch honey berries for her. Buzz-Off has a distrustful nature and tends to hold grudges, but his camaraderie with Stratos paved the way for peace between the peoples of Andreenos and Avion.

Buzz-Off is voiced by Alan Oppenheimer in the 1980s series and Brian Dobson in the 2002 series.

Buzz-Off was voted 1st out of 7 in the 7 Stupidest He-Man Characters by Total Film.

==== Clamp Champ ====
Clamp Champ is a Heroic Warrior who wields a large handheld grabbing device as his primary weapon. He was the only black character to have an action figure in the vintage toy line. Several black characters (such as Zodak and Dekker) have since been released in the 200X and Classics toy lines.

The character was planned for usage in the 2002 series as a replacement for Man-At-Arms who is turned into a Snake-Man, but the series was cancelled before he could be featured in it.

Clamp-Champ made his TV debut in Masters of the Universe: Revelation.

In the Masters of the Universe Classics toyline, Clamp Champ's real name is Raenius. He started out as King Randor's bodyguard before becoming the new Man-At-Arms after Duncan was turned into a Snake Man.

Clamp-Champ is voiced by Method Man in Masters of the Universe: Revelation.

==== Extendar ====
Extendar is a mechanized being and Master of Extension. He appeared in the Masters of the Universe comic series, having been created after the Filmation series finished. Extendar was an Eternian who was captured and turned into a cyborg against his will by Hordak, only to escape before he could be brainwashed into serving his captor.

The Masters of the Universe Classics toyline introduced Extendar as a knight who was captured by Hordak and thrown into the experimental matrix which grafted cybernetic parts to him.

==== Fisto ====
Fisto is an extra-strong warrior with a metallic right hand. In the original series, he was the caretaker of a forest and was hesitant to join in the conflict against Skeletor. He was later appraised by both his fellow Eternians and an alien race as second in strength only to He-Man.

In the 2002 series, he is the last to join the Masters of the Universe and is Man-At-Arms's older brother. The brothers became estranged during the Great Unrest, when Fisto allegedly deserted Randor's forces. Fisto comes to the aid of He-Man and the Masters, using his giant fist to free them from the rocks that had entrapped them in a cave-in. This act shatters his hand, which Man-At-Arms replaces with a larger, metallic hand. The 2002 figure was packaged as "Battle Fist" due to a conflict of copyrighted name with another toy line, but the character was still called Fisto in the animated series.

The Masters of the Universe Classics toyline still listed Fisto as Man-At-Arms's older brother who was rendered amnesiac when helping King Miro during the Great Unrest. Having shattered his right hand saving the Masters of the Universe from a trap set by the Snake Men, Man-At-Arms replaced that hand with a robotic hand.

Fisto is voiced by Lou Scheimer in the 1980s series, Mark Acheson in the 2002 series, and by Ralph Garman in Masters of the Universe: Revelation. Fisto is portrayed by Jóhannes Haukur Jóhannesson in the 2026 film.

==== Stridor ====
Stridor is Fisto's horse and faithful companion. He made one appearance in the Filmation series in the episode "Origin of the Sorceress", in which he was a mechanical horse built by Man-At-Arms who later developed consciousness, leading Man-At-Arms to release him into the wild. Stridor's toy was available packaged with Fisto, as well as separately, and much of Mattel's box art depicted the character of Fisto riding atop Stridor. Stridor later appeared in several Masters of the Universe comic adaptions and toy reissues following the original Filmation series. The character became one of the more recognizable animal companions in the franchise due to his mechanical design and association with Fisto. Updated versions of Stridor were also released as part of later toy collections, including the Masters of the Universe Classics line.

==== Gwildor ====
Gwildor is a dwarf-like Thenurian and inventor of the Cosmic Key. He debuted in the Masters of the Universe film, where Evil-Lyn tricked him into giving her the Cosmic Key so that Skeletor can invade Castle Grayskull.

In the Masters of the Universe Classics toyline, Gwildor is a Vejulian Gwitthrol Troll from Tundaria. He attended Grimhammer University in Eternos and studied under many of Eternia's great inventors, archaeologists, and magicians.

Gwildor is portrayed by Billy Barty in the 1980s live-action film and voiced by Ted Biaselli in Masters of the Universe: Revolution.

==== He-Man / Prince Adam ====
He-Man is "the most powerful man in the universe" and in most media he is the alter-ego of Prince Adam. He is armed with a power harness that enhances his strength, the Sword of Power, as well as a battle axe and a shield. Early media, such as the minicomics packaged with the original run of action figures, also depicts him carrying a knife. He-Man possesses superhuman strength and is capable of performing incredible feats, such as lifting heavy objects such as boulders and buildings, breaking solid rock with his fists, as well as having the advantage over just about any opponent. He is a formidable warrior, although he usually prefers to avoid conflict. He-Man is a strong upholder of moral justice and is regarded by the people of Eternia as their greatest hero. In the original minicomics, He-Man was a wandering barbarian hailing from a jungle tribe. However, both the DC comics and the series He-Man and the Masters of the Universe portrayed him as the alter ego of the young Prince Adam, heir-apparent to the throne of Eternia, and most media since have followed suit. Prince Adam is the son of King Randor and Queen Marlena of Eternia, and is viewed by many as fun-loving, lazy, and cowardly. This is merely an act to keep people from suspecting that he is also He-Man. The 2002 series depicted Adam as carefree and reckless in his younger days, before he accepted his destiny. Prince Adam was given the Sword of Power by The Sorceress of Castle Grayskull, and when he lifts the sword and says "By the Power of Grayskull… I Have the Power!" he is magically transformed into He-Man, defender of Eternia. Man-At-Arms, Orko, and the Sorceress are the only characters who share in the knowledge of Adam's secret, although it was heavily implied in the episode,The Rainbow Warrior that Queen Marlena knew as well. In the He-Man and She-Ra The Secret of the Sword film (which is directly in sequential continuity with the original He-Man and The Masters of The Universe animated series) Prince Adam/He-Man discovers that he has a long lost twin sister, Princess Adora, who was abducted from Eternia as an infant by the evil warlock/warlord Hordak and his then apprentice Skeletor. After He-Man rescues Adora from brainwashed service to the Evil Horde, she receives her own magical sword and becomes She-Ra.

Depending on his transformation to He-Man, at times he is also armed with plate armor, a battle axe, a shield, or deadly snake pinchers. In the 1980s series, Prince Adam and He-Man are almost identically drawn, the difference being that Adam has lighter blonde hair and paler skin, while He-Man has bronzed skin and more golden hair.

In Masters of the Universe vs. The Snakemen, which features a teenaged Adam, he is much shorter and slender than his alter-ego, with blonde eyebrows and pants (versus 1980s Prince Adam's tights). He speaks with a higher tone of voice and often comes across as a clueless adolescent. He-Man, however, has black eyebrows, is much taller, and is far more muscular, as his transformation to He-Man later in the series (starting with "Council of Evil") shows. His voice is deeper, he is wise, and his age in indeterminate (mid 20s to mid 30s in appearance).

Prince Adam and He-Man are voiced by John Erwin in the 1980s series, Cam Clarke in the 2002 series, Chris Wood in Masters of the Universe: Revelation, and Yuri Lowenthal in the 2021 series. In the 1990s series, Prince Adam is voiced by Doug Parker while He-Man is voiced by Garry Chalk. In the 1980s live-action film, He-Man is portrayed by Dolph Lundgren, whereas the 2026 film has both Prince Adam and He-Man portrayed by Nicholas Galitzine.

==== King Randor ====
King Randor is the ruler of Eternia, son of King Miro, husband to Queen Marlena, and father of Prince Adam and Princess Adora.

In the original animated series, Randor is chiefly shown wearing his crown and royal robes, presiding over dinners, and shaking his head over Adam's supposed laziness and Orko's apparent ineptitude. In the episode "Prince Adam No More", he demonstrates battle abilities when he helps He-Man fight off Skeletor's flying robots as they escape from Snake Mountain, mentioning his "strong left hook" from his warrior years. In the He-Man and She-Ra The Secret of the Sword film, he threatens to tear Snake Mountain to the ground to rescue Princess Adora after Skeletor and Hordak abduct her a second time.

In the 2002 series, Randor was significantly redesigned in appearance and personality, presented as more of a full-time warrior king. Physically, he is tall, muscular, and compelling, somewhat Viking-like in appearance. He is introduced during the Great Unrest as a captain who, with comrades including Man-At-Arms, is defending Eternia from evil. After battling and mortally wounding the usurper Keldor, Randor is informed by the Council of Elders that he will rule Eternia as king and, that in the times of future trouble, a hero will appear to assist him in defending the land. Throughout the 2002 series, Randor is shown to be a wise, just, and involved ruler of Eternia, presiding over peace talks with other peoples, forming a ruling council, and, at times, battling the forces of evil alongside He-Man and the Masters.

King Randor is voiced by Lou Scheimer in the 1980s series (including in the He-Man and She-Ra The Secret of the Sword film and in their primetime Christmas Special), Michael Donovan in the 2002 series, Diedrich Bader in Masters of the Universe: Revelation, and Fred Tatasciore in the 2021 series. King Randor made his live-action debut in the 2026 film, portrayed by James Purefoy.

==== Man-At-Arms ====
Man-At-Arms

Man-At-Arms (Duncan) is He-Man's closest ally, originally packaged in the Mattel toy line as the 'Heroic Master of Weapons'. He is Teela's adoptive father and is the inventor of most of the weaponry and vehicles used by the Heroic Warriors. The original minicomics depicted him as the latest in a long family line of great warriors and inventors, who uses the material resources at his disposal to aid He-Man. The series He-Man and the Masters of the Universe by Filmation portrayed him as the Man-At-Arms to King Randor and Queen Marlena, with Man-At-Arms being a title. This portrayal has been adopted by most subsequent versions of the franchise. The series portrayed Man-At-Arms as a mentor to Prince Adam, and as such he was one of the few people aware that Prince Adam and He-Man were one and the same. In the He-Man and She-Ra The Secret of the Sword film, it is revealed that Man-At-Arms's heroic intrusion on Hordak's abduction of an infant Princess Adora prevented the villain from also abducting Prince Adam.

Mark Taylor spoke on the creation of the character stating, "I based it on the Spanish Conquistadors. I always wondered how those suckers had the nerve to do the things they did. They had to be ballsy beyond belief! Mattel's marketing team was really on me to incorporate lots of technology, since Star Wars was still so popular. So I told them I could put high-tech gear on Man-At-Arms. I'd just read Piers Anthony's classic science-fiction novel Sos the Rope, about a character who goes into a wasteland where a superior civilization had once lived. And he digs down and brings out their technology, which gives him a huge advantage over everyone else! So Man-At-Arms does that too."

The live-action film's portrayal of Man-At-Arms was similar to that of the original series, although he seemed to be a seasoned war veteran and possibly the biological father of Teela rather than adopted.

The 2002 show's portrayal of the character was mostly consistent with that of Filmation, but adds that Man-At-Arms served as one of King Randor's chief supporters back during the Great Unrest, before the Council of Elders informed then-Captain Randor that his destiny was to be King of Eternia. Man-At-Arms designs and builds weapons and other technology for the royal family; he also helps train the Royal Guard, Teela, Prince Adam, and the other Masters of the Universe. In the 2002 series, Man-At-Arms sports a short topknot, and the armor on his left arm transforms into a different built-in weapons and tools. This newer Man-At-Arms is also older, more grizzled, and has more of a military bearing than the original 1980s version.

The original Man-At-Arms action figure comes with a club, but the character was rarely ever seen with it in the series. The figure did not have the moustache seen on the character in the series.

The Masters of the Universe Classics toyline had Duncan still a veteran of the Great Unrest and Fisto's brother.

In the 2021 series, Man-At-Arms is depicted as a friend of Teela.

Man-At-Arms was voiced by Alan Oppenheimer in the 1980s series, Garry Chalk in the 2002 series, Liam Cunningham in Masters of the Universe: Revelation, and Antony Del Rio in the 2021 series. In the 1980s live-action film, he is portrayed by Jon Cypher. In the 2026 film, he is portrayed by Idris Elba.

==== Man-E-Faces ====
Man-E-Faces is a multi-faced Heroic Warrior with three faces: a human face, a robotic face, and a monstrous face. His physical abilities mirror the face he wears. Man-E-Faces, at times called "Manny" by his fellow Masters, had a prodigious career as an actor prior to his transformation. He is also a master of disguise. His strongest persona, Man-E-Monster, was also his weakest, because as a monster he could initially be controlled by Beast Man. He enjoys playing the Eternian version of chess; Man-At-Arms built Roboto originally to serve as a gaming partner for Man-E-Faces. The figure came with a gun but it was not used in the cartoon.

In the 2002 TV series, his voice changes with each face. At one point, his monster face was nearly controlled by Beast-Man.

The Masters of the Universe Classics toyline depicted him as having been a master of disguise named Perkaedo who performed for King Randor at Prince Adam's 18th birthday party. He unknowingly drank a magic potion made by Skeletor that transformed him into a monster. Thanks to He-Man and the Sorceress of Castle Grayskull, Perkaedo was cured of this transformation at the cost of gaining three personalities that are associated with his normal face, his monster face, and his robot face.

Man-E-Faces is voiced by Lou Scheimer in the 1980s series, Paul Dobson in the 2002 series, and Stephen Fry in the 2021 series.

==== Mekaneck ====
Mekaneck is the Heroic Warrior with a telescoping mechanical neck that enables him to serve as a spy and do reconnaissance. Man-At-Arms is the one who gave him his extending prosthetic neck, although in the 2002 series this is never discussed; Man-At-Arms is only shown repairing kinks and damage to Mekaneck's neck.

In the 2002 series, Mekaneck occasionally feels useless and wishes he had better superpowers than just an extending neck. This leads him to unknowingly retrieve Count Marzo's power amulet, in the vain hope that he'd be granted better abilities. He-Man and the other Masters finally convince Mekaneck of his worth. Only the figure came with the club, he did not have this in the 1980s series. However, he did use it in the 2002 series. Mekaneck also had a son by the name of Philip.

The Masters of the Universe Classics toyline depicted him as soldier named Orius who was wounded during the Great Unrest event called the Battle of Avion. Upon Duncan bringing him to Castle Grayskull, the Sorceress of Castle Grayskull healed Orius, giving him an extendable neck made from microscopic nanites.

Mekaneck is voiced by Lou Scheimer in the 1980s series and Gabe Khouth in the 2002 series. Mekaneck made his live action debut in the 2026 film, portrayed by James Wilkinson.

CBR voted Mekaneck tenth-worst He-Man toy.

==== Meteorbs ====
The Meteorbs are members of the Rock People who can transform from meteors into animal forms. They appear among Stonedar and Rokkon in the Star Comics (Comet Cat only appeared in one episode of the Filmation series). They are portrayed as pets rather than equal members of the heroic warriors.

- Cometroid – Can transform from meteorb to robot.
- Astrolion – Heroic lion with amazing brute strength.
- Comet Cat – Heroic panther and the fastest of the Meteorbs. Appears in one episode of She-Ra.
- Tuskor – Heroic mammoth who busts force fields with tusks.
- Ty-Grrr – Heroic tiger Meteorb.

==== Moss Man ====
Moss Man (real name Kreann'ot n'Horosh) is a plant-based hero and master of camouflage who can manipulate plant matter, causing flowers to grow but also causing tidal waves of moss and vegetation.

In the 2002 series, Moss Man is a quiet pastoral type who resides in the Eternian forests. Although invited to join the Masters of the Universe by He-Man, Moss Man chooses to retain his position as the guardian of Eternia's flora but agrees to help the Masters whenever he can. His assistance proves pivotal in "Council of Evil" and in other episodes.

The Moss Man figure came with a pine-like scent, textured fur-like moss, and was formed from the same mold as Beast Man. His teeth were painted flat like a plant eater, but you could still see the unpainted Beast Man fangs. In the 1980s series, he only has two appearances because the series was drawing to a close by the time his figure was released. The club (figure's accessory) did not appear in the series, in which he was portrayed as very peaceful.

The Masters of the Universe Classics toyline listed Moss Man as an urban legend who was an ancient god and ally of King Grayskull who became known when he helped the Masters of the Universe.

Moss Man has a cameo in the opening episode of Masters of the Universe: Revelations. When Moss Man is killed, Skeletor remarks that his death "smells like pine".

Moss Man is voiced by Lou Scheimer in the 1980s series, John Payne in the 2002 series, and Alan Oppenheimer in Masters of the Universe: Revelations. In the 2026 film, Moss Man is portrayed by Stephen Adentan.

Comic Book Resources listed the character as part of "He-Man: 15 Most Powerful Masters of the Universe". CBR voted Moss Man seventh-worst He-Man toy.

Cracked thought poorly of Moss Man. Moss Man was voted second in 'the 7 Stupidest He-Man Characters' by Total Film.

==== Orko ====
Orko is a magician from the parallel world of Trolla. Orko's magical abilities vary, depending on his location. On Eternia, Orko's magic does not work properly and his spells frequently backfire with humorous results, while in contrast on his homeworld of Trolla he is a master magician. Orko's attempts at helpfulness often end up causing only more trouble for the Masters and the royal family; in the 2002 series, his magic is much more controlled and successful.

The newer series attributes Orko's occasional ineptitude to the loss of his magic wand while saving 10-year-old Adam. In the original series, he also saved young Prince Adam's life upon his arrival in Eternia, although he lost his magical amulet in the process. The reason why Trollan magic does not work well on Eternia was explained in "Dawn of Dragoon", in which Trolla is portrayed as a backwards world, where tree roots extend to the sky and leaves are in the ground, and Prince Adam had to recite his transformation oath backwards to become He-Man. He was depicted as able to walk, but only on a few occasions in which he was rendered unable to float. Orko's face is concealed by a floppy hat and heavy scarf; according to tradition, members of his people only show their visage to their one true love (in Orko's case, Dree-Elle). Orko is one of the few beings on Eternia who know that Prince Adam is He-Man. In the She-Ra series, Orko evinces a crush on She-Ra. Orko is also the main catalyst of the central action in the He-Man and She-Ra Christmas special.

Orko was originally supposed to appear in the 1987 live-action "Masters of the Universe" theatrical film, but his design was too complex for the studio to produce in live action with its limited budget. Instead, the character of Gwildor (played by Billy Barty) was created for the film to replace Orko and provide the comic relief. Frederick S. Clarke explains that Gwildor was "reportedly a stand-in for Orko … Orko has no feet or legs and is always seen floating or flying, a difficult concept to film live."

In Masters of the Universe: Revelation, Orko remains behind and sacrifices himself to hold Scare Glow off while the rest of the group escape. In the following episode "The Forge at the Forrest Forever", the group of heroes mourn the death of Orko and a gravestone is seen with his name on it. The showrunner Kevin Smith described the decision to kill the character as a way to create compelling drama from a weak character who was seen by the writers as unpopular. A reviewer for CBR praised the decision, saying the redemption arc brought depth to what had previously been the show's worst character.

Orko is voiced by Lou Scheimer in the 1980s series, Gabe Khouth in the 2002 series, Griffin Newman in Masters of the Universe: Revelation, Tom Kenny (as "Ork-0") and Wallace Shawn (as "Orko the Great") in the 2021 series and Christopher Ragland in the 2026 film in a scene during the credits.

Priscilla Kiehnle Warner believed that Orko's face was depicted as "[r]ounded eyes in a darkened space" in order to "indicate innocence".

==== Ram Man ====
Ram Man is a stocky warrior with poor verbal skills whose chief method of attack/defense involves using his head as a battering ram. He is unswervingly loyal to the people of Eternia, at times questioning the loyalty of newer Heroic Warriors such as Buzz-Off. He is also a bit naive and gullible. His lack of intelligence is often played for humor. The moral in "House of Shokoti, Part I" was considered so obvious that Ram Man delivered a lesson about not trying to imitate his human battering ram practices, noting both his heavy armor and his nature as a fictional character.

In the original series, Ram Man is rather short, whereas in the 2002 series he is very large, one of the tallest heroes. He wears an armored helmet in both series, although in the 2002 series he is shown to remove it at times, displaying his short-cropped blonde hair and metal skull cap. He did not use the action figure's axe in the series.

The Masters of the Universe Classics toyline depicted Ram Man as Krass who lived in a village outside of the Vine Jungle. He donned his family's mystical armor when fighting the beast men that attacked his village. When Skeletor attempted to use him in order to ram through the Jaw Bridge of Castle Grayskull, Ram Man defected to He-Man's side upon seeing him fight Skeletor.

In the 2021 series, there is a female version of Ram Man called Ram Ma'am who is the identity of Adam's best friend Krass'tine.

Ram Man is voiced by John Erwin in the 1980s series, Scott McNeil in the 2002 series, Danny Trejo in Masters of the Universe: Revelation, and Judy Alice Lee in the 2021 series. Ram Man made his live-action debut in the 2026 film, portrayed by Jon Xue Zhang.

In 2011, BBC Online reported that performer Jamie Moakes was trying to create "a new commodity, one to replace gold, silver and copper", by buying as many Ram Man figures as possible. Ram Man was voted #9 in The 10 Most Unfortunate Masters Of The Universe Toys by Io9.

Ram Man was voted #12 in The 12 Coolest Masters of the Universe Action Features by Topless Robot. Ram Man was voted by Mania.com as the fourth most Crazy Masters of the Universe Figures. CBR voted Ram Man 14th-worst He-Man toy.

==== Roboto ====
Roboto is a robot Heroic Warrior.

He was introduced into the Masters of the Universe toy line in 1985. His first appearance is in the Mattel minicomic "The Battle of Roboto", in which he is built by Man-At-Arms, who gives him a cybernetically enhanced heart, which enables him to feel human emotions and interact with his comrades as a human rather than as a machine. He was an exceptionally brave fighter, even to the point of taking on Hordak in single combat in one issue.

Given that the accompanying series was drawing to a close at the time his action figure was released, Roboto only makes one appearance in the series, but unlike most other figures released at this time, Roboto was lucky enough to get a whole episode written around him. This episode, "Happy Birthday Roboto" features a radically different origin story for him, in which he was a space explorer from the alien world of Robotica, who crash-landed on Eternia. Initially wrecked by the crash, he was repaired and restored by Man-At-Arms.

In the 2002 version, he was designed and built by Man-At-Arms as a chess-playing robot, who upgrades his body and his knowledge database into that of a fighter in order to assist in the defense of the Eternian palace. Roboto is seen as an unwanted and unskilled pest by Teela, the Captain of the Guards, until Roboto sacrifices himself to protect the Masters of the Universe. Man-At-Arms rebuilds him, and Roboto is finally accepted by Teela. Roboto's mechanical nature helps He-Man in overcoming the Serpent Ring's evil magic, him being a machine did not get possessed by King Hiss's magic. Roboto is the only character (especially released as his figure at the same time he debuts in the series) to appear only once in the 1980s series because the series was about to end when Mattel released his figure. Similar to Trap Jaw's figure, the right arm of the original action figure had interchangeable attachments, which included an axe, laser gun, and claw. Rotating the figure's waist causes gears in his torso to spin, as well as open and close his mouth, which typically hung open when the figure was packaged, but stayed firmly shut in the show unless he was speaking.

The Masters of the Universe Classics toyline depicted Roboto as having been originally built as a chess robot for Man-E-Faces. He later upgraded himself and has become the Masters of the Universe's chief strategist.

Roboto is voiced by Alan Oppenheimer in the 1980s series, Michael Donovan in the 2002 series, and Justin Long in Masters of the Universe: Revelation. In the 2026 film, Roboto is gender-swapped to female and is voiced by Kristen Wiig.

Roboto has gotten some positive reception from critics. Comic Book Resources voted 13th best out of '15 Best He-Man Toys'. Gizmodo ranked Roboto 21st-best toy in Masters of the Universe.

==== Rio Blast ====
Rio Blast is an Eternian gunslinger with weapons hidden in his body. He was never seen in the 1980s series because it came to a close before the release of his figure. "Colonel Blast", inspired by prototypes of this character, did appear on She-Ra: Princess of Power. In the Marvel comic, he was frequently shown eating cayenne peppers.

Rio Blast was voted #5 in 'the 10 Most Unfortunate Masters Of The Universe Toys' by Io9. Rio Blast was voted first in 'the 7 Stupidest He-Man Characters' by Total Film.

In the Masters of the Universe Classics toyline, Rio Blast was the sole survivor of a group of heroic explorers on a starband near Eternia and became the "law" of that last frontier. When a meteorb brought him to Eternia, he sided with He-Man in his battle against Skeletor's forces.

==== Rock People ====
The Rock People (also known as the Comet Warriors) are allies of He-Man and She-Ra. Both only appeared in the She-Ra series, since the He-Man series stopped production by the time their figures were released. They came from the planet Geolon which was destroyed by Horde Prime.

- Rokkon – A heroic young rock being who can turn into a boulder for defense. He appears in multiple MOTU comic books and in the She-Ra series. Rokkon was voiced by Lou Scheimer in the 1980s series.
- Stonedar – A rock being who can turn into a meteor for defense. He appears in multiple MOTU comic books and in the She-Ra series, Stonedar is the leader of the Comet Warriors. Stonedar was voiced by George DiCenzo in the 1980s series, and by Cam Clarke in Masters of the Universe: Revolution.
- Granita – A rock being and the sister of Rokkon. She did not get her own action figure until the Masters of the Universe Classics toyline. Granita was voiced by Erika Scheimer in the 1980s series.

==== Rotar ====
Rotar is the Master of Hyper-Spin. He was a palace guard at the Royal Palace of Eternia until one of the battles against Skeletor's Evil Warriors left him injured. Man-At-Arms saved him with one of his latest inventions called the Gyro Machine. Rotar mostly goes up against Twistoid in battle.

His figure was made after the end of the 1980s Filmation series so he did not appear in animation.

In the Masters of the Universe Classics storyline, Rotar's real name is Runar.

==== Sorceress of Castle Grayskull ====
The Sorceress (real name Teela-Na) is the mystic guardian of Castle Grayskull. She acts as a conduit to the surging energies that dwell within the walls of Castle Grayskull. She can only temporarily access them, as it is shown to overwhelm her when exerting the power for long periods of time. Her powers include; telepathy, telekinesis, clairvoyance, teleportation, large-scale energy barriers, mystics bolts, illusion projection and can polymorph. She can also create portals to various worlds, dimensions and even across time. It is she who bestows on Prince Adam the power to become He-Man. With Grayskulls magic focused by the power sword, He-Man has inexhaustible access to Grayskulls power. In the original animated series, the Sorceress cannot leave the castle for long periods of time unless she utilizes the "Crystal of Ala-nah". It allows her to use the power of Grayskull and remain in her true-form temporarily. Once the crystal is exhausted, her link to Grayskull diminishes and she will revert to her falcon form Zoar. In The Secret of the Sword film, which sequentially follows season two of the original animated series (in a unified continuity), it is the Sorceress who sends He-Man on the quest to find and rescue his long lost twin sister Princess Adora (who later becomes She-Ra).

In the 2002 series, the Sorceress is far from powerless outside Castle Grayskull in her human form, as she demonstrates when she magically defends a village against an evil warlord. The 2002 series also portrays the Sorceress as more capable and more involved with the goings-on of Eternia. Unlike the 1980s Sorceress, who mainly sent psychic calls for help to He-Man, the 2002 Sorceress is more of a defender herself, physically and magically protecting Castle Grayskull and the power of the Elders contained within. The Sorceress is also the mother of Teela, who is destined to inherit her place, although Teela does not know this initially. In the 2002 incarnation, the Sorceress's connection to Teela is alluded to early on in the series. The Sorceress herself is quite different in appearance from her 80s version. The 1980s version features a woman in a white feathered leotard with a falcon-shaped feathered headdress and wings. In the 2002 version, the Sorceress is much more Egyptian in appearance, with a headdress resembling the Egyptian god Horus, an armored bodice, skirt, bare arms, jewelry, and a magical staff. It is disclosed that the Sorceress is just one in a line of Sorceresses whose duty it is to protect the secrets of Castle Grayskull.

In the 2013–2014 DC Comics ongoing series, the Sorceress of Grayskull is captured and imprisoned by Skeletor. Loyal to the end, she refuses to talk or eat until an impatient Skeletor kills her before engaging his nephew Adam/He-Man in a battle outside Castle Grayskull where his Havoc staff is broken and his jaw shattered by He-Man, before being knocked into the pit between Grayskull and the Evergreen Forest. Skeletor is presumed dead, but Adam/He-Man knows this might not be true. A memorial service is held in the Sorceress's honor in Eternos City following the battle at Grayskull.

Her 1987 action figure was released belatedly, as the toyline was about to end. The Sorceress character originated at Mattel, but the action figure is based on her Filmation series design.

The Masters of the Universe Classics toyline mentioned that Teela-Na grew up in an Eternian village and defended her people from a Horde ship. She succeeded the previous Sorceress of Castle Grayskull and defended its secrets. She once used a spell to clone the Sword of He where that same spell was once used by Skeletor to clone the Sorceress so that he would have a magic-wielding bride where the cloned child was saved by Man-At-Arms.

The Sorceress of Castle Grayskull was voiced by Linda Gary in the 1980s series, Venus Terzo in the 1990s series, Nicole Oliver in the 2002 series, Susan Eisenberg in Masters of the Universe: Revelation, and Kimberly Brooks in the 2021 series. In the 1980s live-action film, the Sorceress is portrayed by Christina Pickles, and portrayed by Morena Baccarin in the live-action 2026 film.

Comic Book Resources listed the character at ninth place in "He-Man: 15 Most Powerful Masters of the Universe": "The Sorceress is best known as the bird-headed chick who gave He-Man his magical sword and armor that gave him his powers, but she's a lot more than that. […] she has magic powers that rival almost anyone else on Eternia".

==== She-Ra / Princess Adora ====
She-Ra is introduced in the animated film The Secret of the Sword (a same continuity, direct extension of the original He-Man and the Masters of the Universe Filmation series) as Force Captain Adora, who was an agent of the Evil Horde that rules the planet Etheria. She discovers that she is the long-lost twin sister of Prince Adam/He-Man and the princess of Eternia, having been stolen by the Horde's leader, Hordak, as a baby. She is granted the Sword of Protection, which parallels He-Man's Sword of Power, gaining the power to transform into She-Ra, her secret identity.

For more details on She-Ra related characters (including the members of the Evil Horde) who play a role in the larger Masters of The Universe mythos, see List of She-Ra: Princess of Power and She-Ra and the Princesses of Power characters.

==== Stratos ====
Stratos is one of the Heroic Warriors. He has the power of flight and energy projection, and is the leader of a race of birdpeople who inhabit the airborne city of Avion, high in the Mystic Mountains. He appeared regularly in early episodes of the 1980s series by Filmation, and the season 2 episode "Betrayal of Stratos" explained that Stratos and his people gained their power of flight from the Egg of Avion, a sacred relic of his kingdom.

The 2002 series portrayed Stratos as a long-serving member of the Masters and seemingly one of the older members of their ranks. Stratos and his race featured prominently in the episode "Sky War" which revealed that Avion has had clashes with the people of Andreenos (the bee people) but, thanks to Stratos and the Andreenid captain Buzz-off working together as Masters of the Universe, there is now peace between the two peoples.

No origin was ever given for Stratos in either of the two series, but a comic produced by MV Creations to accompany the 2002 series depicted his entire race was flightless until a magical staff gave them wings and the power of flight. The people of Avion use rocket packs for increased speed and navigation. During battle, they also carry rocket launchers and bombs. In the 1980s series, Stratos sported just a few feathers on his arms and flew Superman style, with his arms straight ahead. In the 2002 series, Stratos was redrawn to have full wings and a little more heft to his frame.

The Masters of the Universe Classics toyline listed Stratos's Avion kind as a race of winged simians that used their magical Emerald Staffs to help them fly. Stratos was among those that augmented their rocket packs and jets to increase their speed and distances.

Stratos is voiced by Lou Scheimer in the 1980s series, Scott McNeil (who gave Stratos an accented inflection that seems to blend Sean Connery with Patrick Stewart) in the 2002 series, and Zeno Robinson in the 2021 series.

==== Snout Spout ====
Snout Spout is a heroic firefighter distinguished by his cybernetic elephant-like head, which allows him to spray water through his trunk. He appears in the She-Ra series and in several He-Man comic books as an Eternian warrior. In several She-Ra episodes, the character is referred to by his prototype name, Hose Nose. He appeared in She-Ra rather than the original He-Man and the Masters of the Universe series because production on the latter had concluded before his action figure was released. One episode identifies him as a friend of He-Man. In his later appearance under the name Snout Spout, his animated design more closely resembles the action figure than in his earlier appearances as Hose Nose. A planned She-Ra episode was to feature members of his species, known as the Hosers, but the episode was never produced. The Snout Spout action figure was packaged with a firefighter's axe, although this accessory does not appear in the animated series.

In the Masters of the Universe Classics toyline continuity, Snout Spout's real name is Jaxton. According to this backstory, Jaxton was an Etherian peasant and one of three gladiators captured by Hordak and subjected to an experimental process that grafted cybernetic components onto his body. After escaping to Eternia, he allied himself with He-Man.

Snout Spout is voiced by George DiCenzo in the 1980s series.

==== Sy-Klone ====
Sy-Klone (real name Dash-Shel) is a Heroic Warrior with the ability to generate powerful winds through hyper-spin. By rapidly rotating his torso and arms, he can create whirlwinds and achieve flight. In the original 1980s Masters of the Universe animated series, Sy-Klone appeared in only two episodes, as his action figure was released shortly before the series concluded. Although his toy included a distinctive yellow shield, this accessory was never featured in the animated series.

In the 2002 continuity, Sy-Klone was reimagined as the last guardian of Anwat Gar, a temple inspired by Tibetan and Japanese architecture that housed the mystical Legacy Stones. After the stones were destroyed, He-Man invited Sy-Klone to join the Masters of the Universe. This incarnation adopted a samurai-inspired appearance and was characterised by his disciplined, honourable nature and his frequent use of proverbs, much to Teela's occasional frustration.

In the 2014 DC Comics continuity, Sy-Klone was established as a member of the Gar race. The series also revealed that other members of the Gar were active during the era of King Grayskull.

According to the Masters of the Universe Classics toyline biography, Sy-Klone's Gar heritage is further explored through the advanced technology incorporated into his armour. Equipped with "wind rockers," the armour enables him to generate powerful winds, while later upgrades include a sophisticated cosmic radar system.

Sy-Klone is voiced by Lou Scheimer in the 1980s series and John Payne in the 2002 series.

==== Teela ====
Teela is the Captain of the Royal Guard and the adopted daughter of Man-At-Arms. In the original Masters of the Universe minicomics, she was introduced as a "warrior goddess" whom He-Man rescued from Skeletor. Following her rescue, Teela provided He-Man with his armour and weapons. This interpretation was later abandoned in the Filmation animated series, which reimagined her as the daughter of the Sorceress of Castle Grayskull and an unnamed, deceased father, though she remained unaware of her true parentage.

The episode "Teela's Quest" revealed that, at the Sorceress's request, Man-At-Arms had raised Teela from infancy as his own daughter. As Captain of the Royal Guard, Teela is courageous, outspoken, and strong-willed, often challenging authority, including Man-At-Arms's orders, and occasionally facing the consequences of her impulsiveness. She is also responsible for training Prince Adam in combat, frequently criticising his seemingly carefree attitude while remaining genuinely fond of him. Unaware that Adam and He-Man are the same person, she greatly admires He-Man and often wishes Adam displayed more of his heroism. Episodes such as "Teela's Quest" and "Teela's Triumph" foreshadow her destiny to one day learn the secrets of Castle Grayskull and succeed her mother as its guardian, though this fate must remain hidden until the appropriate time.

The 2002 animated series retained much of this backstory while portraying Teela as a younger, more ambitious, and headstrong character. Throughout the series, she comes closer than ever before to discovering Prince Adam's secret identity as He-Man.

The Masters of the Universe Classics toyline, launched in 2008, introduced a new continuity that combined elements from earlier incarnations with original material. In this version, Teela is revealed to be a magical clone of the Sorceress, echoing concepts from the original minicomics. She is depicted with both blonde and red hair and is destined to inherit the mantle of the Sorceress. In the timeline's future, she marries King He-Man, and together they have a son, Dare, who becomes the second He-Ro.

In the 2013–2014 DC Comics ongoing series, Teela and Prince Adam are revealed to have been betrothed since childhood, though neither is aware of the arrangement. During a battle in Subternia to restore the deceased Sorceress, Teela sacrifices herself while attempting to defeat King Hiss. Consumed by mystical flames, she is resurrected moments later as the new Sorceress of Grayskull.

Teela has been voiced by Linda Gary in the 1983 He-Man and the Masters of the Universe series, Cathy Weseluck in The New Adventures of He-Man, Lisa Ann Beley in He-Man and the Masters of the Universe (2002), Sarah Michelle Gellar in Masters of the Universe: Revelation, Melissa Benoist in Masters of the Universe: Revolution, and Kimberly Brooks in He-Man and the Masters of the Universe (2021). In the 1987 live-action film, she was portrayed by Chelsea Field, while Camila Mendes portrays the character in the 2026 film.

==== Tytus ====
Tytus was a heroic giant warlord with long blonde hair, who aided He-Ro in Preternia. His weapon of choice is an unusual hollowed-out "capture hammer", which he uses to grab his enemies.

In the Masters of the Universe Classics, Tytus came from Perpetua which he had to leave when the dinosaurs there developed strange techno parts. Upon meeting He-Ro, Tytus aided him against the Horde and the Snake Men. During the First Ultimate Battle Ground, Tytus fell in battle when he sacrificed his life to stop Megator.

==== Zodac ====
Zodac is a Cosmic Enforcer. Much confusion has arisen over the character's true allegiance due to conflicting portrayals in different media. The original 1980s toy line marketed Zodac as a 'Cosmic Enforcer' among the villains. However, the DC Comics and the Filmation series indicated that the character strives to maintain a neutral standpoint, helping both good and evil sides in their times of need while leaning more towards the cause of justice. He appeared in three episodes of the Filmation series, most prominently in "The Search" in which he was seen to put He-Man to the test of retrieving the mystical object known as the Starseed, which could give its holder power over the whole universe. A twist at the end of the episode revealed that Zodac had also informed Skeletor about the Starseed, so that He-Man would be given the chance to retrieve it from him and be tested to find out whether he could overcome the lust for power.

The 2002 series gave a radically different portrayal of the character. Again he was not officially allied with either the heroic or evil forces, but rather than being a universal mediator between both sides he was portrayed as an ancient and mystical warrior who followed his own sense of right and wrong, without much regard for others. He was introduced in the first-season episode "Snake Pit" as a warrior who had helped defeat the Snake Men in ancient times and held a centuries-long grudge against King Hiss after the latter killed and ate his brother. In season 2, he was called upon to stop the Snake Men after they were unleashed on present-day Eternia, but in a shock twist it was revealed it was Zodak himself who allowed the Snake Men to be freed, purely so he could exact his own revenge on King Hiss. Although the character's sense of morality was highly questionable in this series, he ended up being treated as the ultimate hero of the season, defeating King Hiss all by himself in the series's penultimate episode "Awaken the Serpent". Also unlike many throughout the series run, Zodak is amongst the very few who knew of Adam's true identity as He-Man from the beginning. The character was packaged as 'Zodak' in the contemporary toy line and his appearance was significantly altered- for reasons of racial diversity he was black-skinned rather than Caucasian, and had a somewhat tribal appearance, with white tribal markings on his arms. He wielded a staff, unlike the original Zodac who carried a laser gun.

Mark Taylor spoke on the creation of the character stating,"Zodac was all about flying. He was the air wing. I was influenced by Flash Gordon and the flying Vikings."

Due to the radical difference between the 2002 version of Zodac and his 1980s counterpart, the current Masters of the Universe Classics adult collector's toy line has split him into two separate characters. The first of these is 'Zodac' (real name Zodac Zur) who is the Cosmic Enforcer as in the 1980s media, while the second is 'Zodak' (real name Kar-Tor), a student of the former who took his name and appearance and dedicated himself to fighting the Snake Men.

In the 2013 ongoing series from DC Comics, Zodac was given a new and completely different backstory; he is now known as Cosmic Enforcer 097-427-09, Second Platoon out of Overkill Battalion 657, but he is also the half-brother of Hordak and the son of Horde Prime. He is killed and his body absorbed by Hordak one million years before the birth of Adam of the House of Miro.

Zodac made an appearance in Masters of the Universe: Revolution.

Zodac was voiced by Lou Scheimer in the 1983 series, Christopher Judge in the 2002 series, and by Jeffrey Combs in Masters of the Universe: Revolution.

=== Classics toyline characters (2008–2015) ===
==== King Grayskull ====
King D'vann Grayskull is an ancestor of He-Man and She-Ra who ruled Eternia and resided in Castle Grayskull ages before He-Man's time. His wife was the sorceress Veena. During the time of King D'Vann, the Snake People, led by King Hiss, were a threat, as was Hordak. Hordak defeated the forces of King Hiss and was set to challenge Grayskull. A magic Oracle (who, like Orko, hailed from Trolla) revealed to Grayskull that he already had the power within him to defeat Hordak. Mortally wounded in the battle, Grayskull instructed his comrades and advisors to use his power to keep the peace on Eternia and that, one day, a hero would come to help in that endeavor. As he died, Veena promised to protect the power that resided in Grayskull to the best of her abilities and, when she was no longer capable, that she would find one to take her place. Grayskull's immense power rose from his corpse, imbued his sword with power, then surrounded his comrades, who were magically transformed into the beings known as the Council of Elders. King Grayskull was drawn to resemble He-Man, although a more barbaric, Viking-style He-Man.

King Grayskull was originally designed by the Four Horsemen to be an older He-Man.

King Grayskull's action figure was released as part of the Masters of the Universe Classics toyline. In addition, there was an action figure called Spirit of Grayskull where the bio mentions that King Grayskull's ghost still resides in Castle Grayskull and helps the Sorceress of Castle Grayskull protect it.

King Grayskull was voiced by Cam Clarke in the 2002 series, Dennis Haysbert in Masters of the Universe: Revelation, and Alan Oppenheimer in the 2021 series.

==== Queen Grayskull ====
Queen Veena Grayskull is married to King Grayskull and is one of Adam and Adora's ancestors. She is a sorceress with similar powers to the later Sorceress of Castle Grayskull where she wears bird-like attire, leg guards, and is always barefoot.

When King Grayskull died, Queen Veena promised to protect the power that resided in Grayskull to the best of her abilities and, when she was no longer capable, that she would find one to take her place. In addition, she has taken on Sharella as her apprentice where Sharella became the Goddess of Castle Grayskull.

Queen Veena Grayskull was voiced by Nicole Oliver in the 2002 series.

==== Battle Lion ====
Battle Lion is a Green Lion named who is the pet of King Grayskull and serves a role that would later be served by Cringer. When empowered by King Grayskull's powers, Cringer becomes a Battle Cat-like form.

==== He-Ro ====
He-Ro was the most powerful wizard in the universe and a heroic cosmic warrior. He was the protagonist of the "Powers of Grayskull" prequel that was never released. He led the forces of Eternia against the forces of King Hiss and the Snake Men.

His alter ego in "The Powers of Grayskull" line was going to be a young man named Gray, mirroring the Adam/He-Man dual identity. Uttering the magic words "By the power of good, I strive for peace!" would transform Gray into He-Ro.

According to his 2009 packaging biography, his real name is Ro and he was infected with a techno-organic virus by the Horde Supreme during an epic battle and sent through a vortex to the magic planet of Eternia, where he was healed by Eldor. Out of gratitude, he fought with King Grayskull, eventually bequeathing his magic sword to King Grayskull upon his heroic death.

He-Ro was voiced by Phil LaMarr in Masters of the Universe: Revelation.

In 1996, a prequel TV series was proposed that would star He-Ro.

==== Prince Dare ====
In 1996, a "Son of He-Man" TV series featured a different He-Ro, who is the identity of Prince Dare and the son of King Adam and Teela.

The Masters of the Universe Classics toyline detailed He-Ro's history of being Adam and Teela's son and how he used his father's Sword of Power to slay the Unnamed One.

==== Eldor ====
Eldor was a great wizard and sage who was He-Ro's mentor in Preternia and the guardian of The Book of Living Spells. The original action figure was created but not produced. Only prototype pictures exist.

In 2014, Mattel finally released a Masters of the Universe Classics figure of Eldor. His bio stated that he found "Gray" in a crater affected by a techno virus where Eldor healed him with a mystic pool. To repay Eldor, "Gray" became his student and they fought against the Snake Men. Eldor would later cast a spell that would summon the Three Towers from Subternia when a time of great kings occurs.

==== The Goddess of Eternia ====
After the death of King Grayskull, the Power of the Universe was transferred from the Sword of Power to the Council of Elders, who hid it deep within his castle. Knowing the full sword was the key to channeling the power again, they split it in two to prevent it from falling into the hands of evil. For five thousand years, they waited for a worthy heir to be born. During this time their spirit guide, the creature known as The Goddess of Eternia, trained secret heroic guardians to keep the two halves of the sword separated. Many of these brave warriors took the name "He-Man" in honor of the sword they protected giving birth to many different legends of the protector of Eternia.

The Goddess is a translucent green repaint of the Masters of the Universe Classics Teela action figure. She is based on an early version of the Sorceress, as she appeared in the minicomic "He-Man and the Power Sword". This figure is notorious among collectors for its poor quality plastic, which is prone to breakage.

The character's "real name", Sharella, originates from the short-lived Masters of the Universe spin-off line "The Powers of Grayskull", where she was intended to be a tribal chieftess who would have helped Eldor raise Gray (aka He-Ro) and guided him in his battles against the Snake Men. While the Masters of the Universe Classics toyline used the name Sharella for the Goddess of Castle Grayskull, it was also mentioned that she started out as an apprentice to Queen Grayskull.

==== Wun-Dar ====
One hundred years before Prince Adam was born, Wun-Dar, a warrior from deep in the savage underground city of Tundaria, rescued a young woman who turned out to be the Goddess of Eternia. Providing him with cosmic battle armor and a sophisticated ray gun that could tap into almost unlimited power, the Goddess tasked Wun-Dar to protect both halves of the sword of He and keep them apart so as not to fall into the hands of evil. Like many warriors before him, Wun-Dar became known as "The He-Man", battling in a savage way to keep evil from obtaining the key to the great power hidden inside the long-forgotten Castle Grayskull.

The character Wun-Dar was created for the Masters of the Universe Classics toyline, with an action figure available exclusively to customers who purchased the monthly (2010) subscription. This figure is based on "Savage He-Man", an extremely rare action figure of unknown origins, which is a brown-haired repaint of the original 1982 He-Man. It is commonly believed among the fan community to be a promotional item associated with Wonder Bread, but no documentation has as yet been found to prove the theory. Mattel named the Classics figure "Wun-Dar" to pay homage to the myth, as well as including a small plastic loaf of bread accessory with the toy.

Wun-Dar made his TV debut in Masters of the Universe: Revelation.

Wun-Dar is voiced by Jay Tavare in Masters of the Universe: Revelation.

==== Fearless Photog ====
Fearless Photog

In 1986, Mattel held a contest for children to send in designs for new characters. Forty-four thousand people submitted their designs. Five finalists were chosen, and more than 150,000 people then voted for their favorite. Then 12-year-old Nathan Bitner entered the contest with Fearless Photog, eventually winning. Nathan was awarded a scholarship for $100,000, plus a five-day trip to Disneyland. Despite the contest's premise, however, Fearless Photog never went into production.

Fearless Photog is a heroic warrior with a robotic camera-shaped head. He has the ability to "focus in" on his enemies and drain their strength. His chest plate displays silhouettes of his defeated enemies.

In 2011, Mattel revealed that Fearless Photog would finally receive a figure as the first entry in their six-figure Masters of the Universe Classics 30th Anniversary series. His bio depicts him as an apprentice to Gwildor, who invented the Photog Emulator which got him a spot in the Masters of the Universe. During the Second Ultimate Battleground, Fearless Photog defeated Clawful and Whiplash.

==== Queen Marlena ====
Queen Marlena is the Queen of Eternia and mother of the twins Prince Adam and Princess Adora. Both the original series and the 2002 series show her as suspecting her son is He-Man. In the 1980s series, Marlena Glenn is originally an astronaut from Boise, Idaho who crash-landed on Eternia and chose to stay. In the 1980s series, Queen Marlena is portrayed wearing a crown and long gown and not doing much other than attending dinners with her husband King Randor. However, in the episode "The Rainbow Warrior", her skills as both a pilot and a leader are shown in great detail. Later in that episode, it is hinted that Queen Marlena also knows her son Adam is He-Man. This is later confirmed on the Classics toy's biography card.

In the 2002 series, Queen Marlena is given an expanded role, as she is shown giving counsel to her husband and regularly departing on diplomatic missions throughout Eternia. She is also able to fight with a knife and blaster to defend herself, as seen when she is stalked by Kobra Khan and Tung Lashor.

Unlike her husband King Randor, she did not have a toy made of her until the Masters of the Universe Classics line in 2011, which packaged her as both the royal queen and a space captain.

Queen Marlena was voiced by Linda Gary in the 1980s series, Jay Scheimer in a few episodes of the 1980s series, Nicole Oliver in the 2002 series, and Alicia Silverstone in Masters of the Universe: Revelation. Queen Marlena made her live-action debut in the 2026 film, portrayed by Charlotte Riley. This version of Marlena is shown deciding to send a young Adam from Eternia to Earth after a civil war breaks out between his father Randor and Skeletor, her family ultimately raising him as a normal human boy under the name Adam Glenn. Following Randor's death and Skeletor's defeat, Queen Marlena becomes the sole monarch of Eternos.

==== Eternian Palace Guards ====
The Eternian Palace Guards are made up of the bravest and noblest warriors in the Light Hemisphere of Eternia. They serve as the soldiers of King Randor and are led by Teela and Man-At-Arms.

There was a two pack of the generic Palace Guards in the Masters of the Universe Classics toyline.

==== Sky High ====
First appearing in the Masters of the Universe Classics toyline, Sky High is a former Eternian Palace Guard named Darid who is an ace test pilot that assisted in Man-At-Arms's inventions. While defending Eternos from the skies, Darid took up the name Sky High and helped Man-At-Arms to upgrade the Jet Sleds and Wind Raiders for faster acceleration and smoother landings.

==== Hawke ====
Hawke is a female member of the Bird People.

In the 80s series, her greed was taken advantage of by Skeletor where she framed Stratos for a sabotage and got him banished from Avion. When she stole the Egg of Avion, Skeletor double-crossed her and had Whiplash imprison her in a cage. After Skeletor was defeated and Stratos was cleared of all charges, Hawke was placed on punishment detail.

In the 2002 series, Hawke is a warrior that is loyal to Stratos. She later was present with the Avionian representatives who are members of King Randor's council.

Hawke got an action figure in 2017 Masters of the Universe classics wave. Her bio states that she was a healer from Calgary until she met Stratos who saved her from the attacking Torgs and they fell in love. When Delora got badly injured after recovering the Egg of Avion and the Emerald Staff of Avion from Skeletor, Stratos and Hawke used its powers which healed her and granted the Avionians the power of flight.

Hawke was voiced by Linda Gary in the 1980s series and by Kathleen Barr in the 2002 TV series.

==== Kittrina ====
Kittrina is a cat-like warrior who appeared in the 1980s series and is a member of the Cat Folk race that lived in the Vine Jungle. As an agent of King Paw, Kittrina was angered that the people of Eternos City was intruding on their Temple of the Cat. She helped He-Man and Teela recover a Cat Folk statue that Webstor stole as part of Skeletor's plot to free the Grimalkin demon from its statue form. Afterwards, Kittrina plans to improve the relationship between the humans and the Cat Folk after being infatuated by Battle Cat.

Kittrina later got an action figure in the Masters of the Universe Classics toyline.

Kittrina was voiced by Linda Gary in the 1980s series.

==== Slamurai ====
First appearing the Masters of the Universe Classics toyline, Slamurai is a heroic white-clad ninja from the planet Bashido and an enemy of Ninjor. He was originally meant to appear in the original toyline in the 1988 wave but was cancelled when the line ended.

==== The Mighty Spector ====
John Spector is a former palace guard who eventually became known as The Mighty Spector, a time-traveling spy in a purple "vortex suit" and member of the Time Agents. Reporting to King He-Man in the not-to-distant future, he travels around in a hovercraft he calls the "Spectormobile". Created exclusively for the Masters of the Universe Classics toyline.

==== Sir Laser-Lot ====
Sir Laser-Lot is a knight in an enchanted blue armor wielding a laser sword, shield, and mace. Designed by Geoff Johns and sculpted by the Four Horsemen, Sir Laser-Lot was created exclusively for the Classics toyline. He was the mightiest of King Grayskull's knights on Preternia. He-Man had Sir Laser-Lot brought to the present to serve as the King's new Man-at-Arms so that he can train the King's son Dare and the Royal Guards in ancient battle techniques.

==== Dekker ====
Dekker (voiced by Blu Mankuma) was originally a mercenary from the Dunes of Doom who sided with King Miro during the Great Unrest. When working for King Miro, Dekker trained the palace guards and met Duncan who Dekker took on as an apprentice. Dekker later retired to life as a fisherman on Orkos Island and had passed his Man-At-Arms title to Duncan. He does occasionally help the Masters of the Universe in their fight against the forces of evil.

Dekker was created for the 2002 series and was eventually made into an action figure in the Masters of the Universe Classics toyline which revealed his full history.

==== Castle Grayskullman ====
Castle Grayskullman was created for the Masters of the Universe Classics by lifelong MOTU enthusiast Daniel Benedict after winning the 30th Anniversary "Create-A-Character" contest. The action figure's swords are based upon the original Castle Grayskull playset's flag symbols and his shield is based upon the emblem on the Castle's Jawbridge.

During the Second Ultimate Battleground, Hordak and King Hiss's grand army pressed in against the allied heroes of Eternia. Reaching out through the Orb of Power that is hidden deep inside Castle Grayskull, He-Man and Teela (who is the new Sorceress of Castle Grayskull) used an unrepeatable spell to call upon the Powers of Grayskull and infuse life into the very walls of the castle itself. Rising from the castle's hidden Chamber of Defense, Castle Grayskullman marched into battle swinging his dual swords of power where he helped to turn the tide.

==== Lord Dactys ====
Lord Dactys (voiced by Richard Newman in the 2002 series) is the leader of the bat-like Speleans and an old friend of King Randor. The Speleans and the Caligars have been in a feud ever since they found their homes destroyed following the Great Unrest where they helped Miro. In "To Walk with Dragons," Lord Dactys becomes a member of King Randor's council. During the threat of King Hiss, Lord Dactys and Ceratus settled their differences.

He later gained an action figure in the Masters of the Universe Classics toyline, with his name incorrectly spelled as Lord Dactus.

==== Ceratus ====
Exclusive to the 2002 series, Ceratus (voiced by Brian Dobson) is the leader of the Caligars. He has issues with Whiplash who betrayed their kind to Skeletor. At one point, Prince Adam mistook one of the Caligars as Whiplash which angered him. The Caligars and the Speleans have been in a feud ever since they found their homes destroyed following the Great Unrest where they helped King Miro. During the threat of King Hiss, Ceratus and Lord Dactys put aside their differences.

A Masters of the Universe Classics figure of Ceratus is due for release in 2015. His bio also mentioned that he joined King Randor's council and assisted in the Second Ultimate Battle Ground.

==== Chief Carnivus ====
Exclusive to the 2002 series, Chief Carnivus (voiced by Paul Dobson) is the lion-like warrior chief of the Qadians, a tribe of cat-people. While originally neutral, he agrees with Prince Adam and Teela to side with King Randor and He-Man in the fights against Skeletor. In "To Walk with Dragons," Chief Carnivus becomes a member of King Randor's council.

He later gained an action figure in the Masters of the Universe Classics toyline where his full name is Carnivus Fervelius III.

==== Kulatak Elder ====
The Kulatak Elder (voiced by Campbell Lane in the first appearance, Michael Donovan in the second appearance) is the elderly leader of the snow monster-like Kulataks which were at first thought to be mythical and is exclusive to the 2002 series. In "To Walk with Dragons," the Kulatak Elder becomes a member of King Randor's council.

A Masters of the Universe Classics figure of the character named King Chooblah was released.

==== Lizard Man ====
Created for the original He-Man series, Lizard Man (voiced by Lou Scheimer) is a lizard man. He is shorter than most of his battle comrades with speed and agility as his main attributes.

He did not have a toy made of him until 2015 when he was included in the Masters of the Universe Classics toyline which depicted his real name as Gayn. Lizard Man's bio states that he has dealt with discrimination due to his genetic connections to the Snake Men.

==== Oo-Larr ====
Exclusive to the Masters of the Universe Classics toyline, Oo-Larr is a jungle He-Man based on He-Man from early minicomics.

In Masters of the Universe: Revelation, Adam transforms into Savage He-Man (vocal effects provided by Dee Bradley Baker) who is inspired by Oo-Larr when he channeled the transformation without the sword.

==== Plasmar ====
First appearing in the Masters of the Universe Classics toyline, Plasmar is a warrior who saw his fellow warriors and his family slain by the Horde and the Snake Men during the Battle of Xarkoran. Absorbing the powers of the Gem of Tomadge, he gained the ability to gain plasma-blast energy. He fought the Snake Men Warriors that he hunted down and even wore their hides. Plasmar was later found by his old friend Clamp Champ where he sided with He-Man.

==== Vikor ====
Exclusive to the Masters of the Universe Classics toyline, Vikor is the "He-Man of the North."

Sometime after King Grayskull's death, a Viking-like warrior from the north named Vikor was chosen by the Goddess of Castle Grayskull to help protect the Sword of He as Eternia awaits a true heir to be born. Some of his known heroics involved fighting the remaining Snake Men and defending the Valley of Gnarl from the Fighting Foe Men. Vikor's legends will never be forgotten in the great archives of Eternia.

Vikor made his TV debut in Masters of the Universe: Revelation.

Vikor is voiced by Adam Gifford in Masters of the Universe: Revelation.

=== Other heroes associated with MOTU ===
He-Man has several allies who are independent of the Heroic Warriors. Although they only occasionally assist He-Man (and only when it suits their purposes), they are considered heroic characters nonetheless.

==== Granamyr ====
Granamyr is the oldest and wisest of the dragons of Darksmoke, an ancient dragon kingdom on Eternia. Granamyr greatly distrusts humans after a great war between the dragons and humans centuries ago, but he strongly respects He-Man, who convinces him there is still some hope for humankind. Granamyr would appear in a few more episodes of the original Filmation-era He-Man series, including in one episode of She-Ra: Princess of Power. Granamyr is one of the most powerful magic users on Eternia and apparently possesses such extraordinary power that even Skeletor dares not challenge him.

He did not have a toy made of him in the vintage era. As of December 2012, he has now been included in the Masters of the Universe Classics toyline.

Granmyr was voiced by John Erwin in the 1985 series and by John De Lancie in Masters of the Universe: Revolution.

==== Faceless One ====
Created for the 2002 series, the Faceless One (voiced by Richard Newman) is an ancient ruler of the former city of Zalesia, which now lies in ruins. In the comic adaption of MOTU, it is revealed that said mystic was once an Elder on the Council of Wisdom. But when his daughter was stolen from his kingdom by the Snake Men, his former compatriots turned their backs on him due to breaking their cardinal law against siring a family. In return for the safety of his progeny, King Hiss would demand a means of awakening and controlling an ancient God Beast cast in the form of Snake Mountain from the timeless wizard. The fallen king would oblige, but felt incredible guilt at the horror that followed after Serpos was unleashed upon Eternia. As punishment for betraying the world to the Snake Men, the other Elders cursed him with immortality and mystically imprisoned him within the boundaries of his devastated fiefdom, which had been annihilated in the snake deity's wake. Thousands of years later, he often offers his help or implores the aid of He-Man to atone for past misdeeds, but can only exist outside Zalesia in an intangible ghost-like state. The mysterious child of the Faceless One is later revealed to be Evil-Lyn herself.

An action figure of the Faceless One was released in 2011 as part of the Masters of the Universe Classics toyline where his bio was revealed.

==== Procrustus ====
Originally appearing in a comic book, Procrustus is an immortal giant with four arms who resides at the very centre of Eternia, holding the planet itself together with his mystical strength ever since Hordak tried to use the Spell of Separation to get to the Starseed within.

A toy of Procrustus was released in 2012 as part of the Masters of the Universe Classics toyline.

==== Strobo ====
Strobo is a Cosmic Enforcer who appears in a comic book. He has a mirror built into his chest and possesses light-reflecting powers. His design was based on a mixture of parts from existing characters—Sy-Klone's body, Zodac's head, and King Randor's cape.

A Masters of the Universe Classics action figure of him was released in 2013.

=== Animated series and comic-exclusive heroes ===
==== Lieutenant Andra ====
Lieutenant Andra is a prominent female character in the Star Comics. However, she did appear to have aligned with Faker in "Injustice vs. Masters of the Universe" comic series.

She appears in Masters of the Universe: Revelation, voiced by Tiffany Smith.

==== King Miro ====
King Miro is King Randor's father and the grandfather of Prince Adam and Princess Adora. Legend has it in the 1980s series that King Miro disappeared for many years, held captive by the evil Enchantress. Restored to Eternia, he is taken to Etheria by Prince Adam to meet Adam's sister Adora.

In the 2002 series, Miro was the Captain of the Guards that served the Elders where he had a part in the apprehension of Count Marzo. King Miro has been married twice: his first wife was a member of the blue-skinned humanoid race known as Gar. She gave Miro his first-born son, a half-Gar named Keldor, Randor's half-brother. Keldor eventually became the evil Skeletor.

King Miro was voiced by Lou Scheimer in the 1980s series, Michael Donovan in the 2002 series, and by Tim Sheridan in Masters of the Universe: Revolution.

==== Dree-Elle ====
Dree-Elle (voiced by Linda Gary) is a female Trollan and Orko's girlfriend. Unlike Orko himself, she did not have a toy made of her until the Masters of the Universe Classics toyline where she was packaged with Montork.

==== Yukkers ====
Yukkers (voiced by Alan Oppenheimer) is the mischievous brother of Dree-Elle. Wears a trucker cap and sports a "Y" on the front of his garment.

==== Montork ====
Montork (voiced by Lou Scheimer) is Orko's uncle from Trolla, who resembles Orko, but has a beard and glasses, No toy of Uncle Montork was ever made until the Masters of the Universe Classics toyline where he was packaged with Dree Elle. His fellow Trollans, Snoob and Yukkers, did not have toys made of them either.

==== Kol Darr ====
Kol Darr (voiced by John Erwin) is a gladiator-like warrior and ally of He-Man. He flies around on Shadow Master, an armored flying horse with the ability to blend into any shadow.

==== Starchild ====
Starchild (voiced by Linda Gary) is a beautiful young girl, apparently between six and seven years old. She has blonde hair and blue eyes, and she wears an outfit which resembles a red one-piece bathing suit with a yellow star and white boots. She has incredible magical powers, which she describes as feelings. Said powers cause a glow to appear around those she loves; the Starchild can use this "glow" to defend herself from those who would exploit her abilities for selfish ends, as in the Filmation episode "The Starchild" when the Tree People and the Cave Dwellers wanted custody of her.

Starchild also appears in the Larry DiTillio episode "Bargain with Evil", in which she combines her energy with that of another sorceress to open an inter-dimensional gateway.

==== Melaktha ====
Melaktha (voiced by Alan Oppenheimer) is the royal archaeologist, a muscular, bearded, dark-skinned intellectual who was created by writer Larry DiTillio to add more racial diversity to the original series. He first appears in "House of Shokoti" parts 1 and 2. Melaktha has not been released as a toy.

==== Scrollos ====
Scrollos is a mysterious character who served as the narrator of the UK comics, Scrollos also helped observe and protect Eternia from extraterrestrial threats. He resides in a spaceship with a large crew of robots.

=== Film characters ===
None of these characters had toys made of them.

- Detective Hugh Lubic (portrayed by James Tolkan) – Lubic is a tough detective from the 1987 film. In the film's climax, he is accidentally transported to Eternia by the Cosmic Key and ends up battling Skeletor's forces alongside He-Man and his friends. Celebrated for his deed, he later remains on Eternia, similar to He-Man's mother Queen Marlena Glenn.
- Julie Winston (portrayed by Courteney Cox) – Julie is a young girl who assists He-Man in regaining the Cosmic Key. Julie's parents were killed in a plane crash, leaving her orphaned and suffering from survivors guilt as she feels responsible for having taken that flight. By the end of the film, Gwildor sends Julie and Kevin back to before her parents died.
- Kevin Corrigan (portrayed by Robert Duncan McNeill) – Kevin is Julie's boyfriend, an aspiring young musician who initially mistakes the Cosmic Key as a synthesizer.

== Evil Warriors ==
=== Vintage toyline characters (1982–1988) ===
==== Beast Man ====
Beast Man makes his debut in Mattel's illustrated books as a follower of Skeletor. As the toyline expanded, he stayed at Skeletor's side. Beast Man is a mammalian humanoid with orange and red fur, claws, fangs, and an ape-like build who can telepathically summon wild creatures of Eternia to aid Skeletor's schemes. He was frequently portrayed as a buffoon who could not do much correctly. The whip that accompanied the action figure rarely appeared in the 1980s series but was frequently used in the 2002 incarnation as Beast Man's way of controlling the animals he summoned to do his bidding.

The design of Beast Man was based on the 1973 Big Jim figure named the "real action gorilla".

In the 1987 film, Beast Man is featured as one of Skeletor's minions where Evil-Lyn listed him as "The Beast Man." He does not speak, but his sounds are translated by Karg.

In the 2002 series, Beast Man is far more ferocious and more of a threat to the heroes. He is a skilled fighter and often comes to the rescue of Skeletor and his fellow Evil Warriors, using his griffins as their most frequent means of transportation.

The Masters of the Universe Classics depicted him as Raqquill Rqazz, a member of the race of beast men who was banished from his home in the Vine Jungle for his evil deeds and allied with Keldor.

Beast Man was voiced by John Erwin in the 1980s series, Scott McNeil in the 2002 series, Kevin Michael Richardson in Masters of the Universe: Revelation, and Trevor Devall in the 2021 series. In the 1987 live-action film, Beast Man was portrayed by Tony Carroll. In the 2026 film, Beast Man is voiced by Gary Martin.

Comic Book Resources list the character as part of "He-Man: 15 Most Powerful Masters of the Universe". Beast Man was rated the 2nd most useless character.

==== Blade ====
Blade is a master swordsman and bounty hunter with an eyepatch and has a shenandoah but no hair. His swordsmanship can rival He-Man's. He appears in the 1987 film, the minicomics and the Marvel comics. Originally Tri-Klops was going to appear in the film instead. Like Tri-Klops, his toy is sometimes mistaken for a Heroic Warrior due to his human appearance.

In the Masters of the Universe Classics toyline, Blade started out as a pirate from the Kylax System who was transported to Eternia by Skeletor. He agreed to help Skeletor at the right price.

He was portrayed by Anthony De Longis in the 1987 live-action film.

==== Blast-Attak ====
Blast-Attak is a robotic warrior built as a walking time bomb. After a set period of time, he will explode and cause immense damage before reforming, unharmed. He did not appear in the cartoon because it ended before his figure was released. There is some debate over which faction he belongs to, as the Mattel style guide and the original toy packaging state that he is an Evil Warrior of Skeletor, whilst some comics depict him as a member of the Snake Men serving King Hiss.

The Masters of the Universe Classics toyline designates him as a Snake Man when he was summoned to Eternia by Skeletor's light spell and stolen from him by the Snake Men.

==== Clawful ====
Clawful is a giant anthropomorphic crab with claws similar to a fiddler crab. Whereas the figure has swarthy skin and its boots are dark blue, he has all red skin and yellow boots in the series.

In the 2002 series, Clawful is strong but has a childlike mentality and is not very clever. Despite his constant blunders, it seems he is the only Master of Evil whom Evil-Lyn is fond of. In one episode, we encounter more members of his race who are more intelligent than Clawful. They can communicate with each other via long distances using the clicking of their pincers as if it was morse code.

The Masters of the Universe Classics toyline identified Clawful's kind as Karakoni and depicted him as joining up with Skeletor after saving Beast Man from a Seclapoid. A spell from Evil-Lyn turned Clawful from a dull-witted Karakoni to a keen Karakoni warrior and strategist.

Clawful was voiced by Lou Scheimer in the 1980s series and Scott McNeil in the 2002 series.

==== Evil-Lyn ====
Evil-Lyn is a malevolent sorceress, whose powers seem to be second only to Skeletor's. Exceptionally cunning, she is merely in Skeletor's ranks to suit her own ends. In the original series, she was not reliant on wands and other objects to generate her magic, although she has used such artifacts as the Shaping Staff to supplement her spectacular innate powers on a few occasions. She evinced shades of goodness in one or two episodes, such as 'The Witch and the Warrior', but her nature is essentially fiendish. There was nothing romantic in her relationship with Skeletor in the original Filmation series, unlike subsequent versions. Although her primary affiliation was with Skeletor, she would also venture out on her own and assist other dark lords such as Dark-Dream and Gorgon on occasion. She seemed to be the only one of Skeletor's evil warriors with the courage to raise her voice at him and chastise him.

The original figure has yellow skin, although she is depicted in both animated series as having a Caucasian flesh tone (though the 2002 incarnation has a greenish tint to it). In "The Witch and the Warrior," she removes her helmet for the only time in the series because of extreme heat, and has closely cut white hair. In an earlier episode she appeared to the Widgets as a blonde, but she was specifically using a magic spell to alter her appearance, even though she wore her usual clothing.

In the 2002 series, Evil-Lyn's background is expanded, including her being fathered by The Faceless One, a powerful sorcerer who despairs of his daughter's choice to follow Skeletor. Although Evil-Lyn is shown to have her own agenda, she still maintains some loyalty to her bloodline ("The things I do for family", she mutters as she rescues the Ram's Stone from the abyss). Her first meeting with Keldor shows her as a young woman with collar-length white hair who is physically attracted to the man who would become Skeletor ("I like what I see," she purrs at Keldor). Later in the series, her hair is shown to be close cropped. This version of Evil-Lyn relied heavily on her magical staff to cast her spells. Without it, her powers were significantly diminished.

In the Masters of the Universe Classics toyline, Evil-Lyn's history with the Faceless One remains intact. After leaving her father, she learned different types of magic from every great master of magic. Evil-Lyn used to date Keldor before the accident that led to him becoming Skeletor. His loss of love led to Evil-Lyn constantly coming up with secret plans to scheme against him with two of them leading to the freedom of Hordak and King Hiss.

Evil-Lyn was voiced by Linda Gary in the 1980s series, Kathleen Barr in the 2002 series, Lena Headey in Masters of the Universe: Revelation, and Grey DeLisle in the 2021 series. In the 1987 live-action film she is portrayed by Meg Foster, and in the 2026 live-action film by Alison Brie.

==== Evil Meteorbs ====
These Meteorbs are renegade members of the Rock People who can transform from meteors to animal forms. They are portrayed as pets rather than equal members of the Evil Warriors.

- Rhinorb – A rhinoceros with a ramming horn.
- Orbear – A grizzly bear who bashes enemies with his claws.
- Gore-Illa – An ape with monstrous muscle power.
- Dinosorb – A Brontosaurus who stomps his feet to start earthquakes.
- Crocobite – A crocodile with crushing jaws.

==== Faker ====
Faker is an evil robot duplicate of He-Man, created by Skeletor. The toy version is done in blue with red hair and orange torso armor with the backstory that he is a robot duplicate that did not work out. In one annual, he is a deformed clone.

However, in his sole appearance in the series, Faker is a magical creation, identical to He-Man apart from glowing eyes and odd intonation.

The Masters of the Universe Classics toyline had Faker originally created by Man-At-Arms to cover for He-Man when Prince Adam is needed. He would later be abandoned and salvaged from the Eternian junkyard by Tri-Klops. At one point, Skeletor had Faker pose as He-Man to make the people of Eternia think that He-Man turned evil.

In Masters of the Universe: Revelations, Faker partakes in the attack on Castle Grayskull and is sliced in half by Man-At-Arms's laser.

Faker was voiced by John Erwin in the 1980s series.

==== Jitsu ====
Jitsu appeared only once as a supporting character in "The Dragon Invasion" episode in 1983. The character's name in the script is Chopper, although he is not named on-screen. His role in this episode is to accompany Skeletor in an invasion of Castle Grayskull. He has only one line and aside from a brief display of his karate-chopping abilities, has no character development.

The character appeared in the minicomic stories Hordak: The Ruthless Leader's Revenge! and Mantenna and the Menace of the Evil Horde! The character was not used in the 2002 franchise relaunch, though was included in Series 6 of NECA's Masters of the Universe mini-statue line, and came with a pack-in figurine of Odiphus, which had originally been planned for release in 2005.

In the Masters of the Universe Classics toyline, Jitsu was an intergalactic bandit and master of several forms of martail arts who was sprung from Prison Starr by Keldor. He stayed with him when Keldor turned into Skeletor. When wounded by Fisto during the Battle at Gretori Bridge, Jitsu received a golden robotic hand from Tri-Klops.

Jitsu was voiced by Lou Scheimer in the 1980s series.

===== Night Stalker =====
Night Stalker appears only in original mini-books. Some versions depict it as Jitsu's evil robotic steed while other versions describe it as the "reincarnation" of the heroic Stridor. The original toyline paired the robot horse with Jitsu, making the duo the evil counterparts of Stridor and Fisto.

==== Mer-Man ====
Mer-Man is a fish-man who controls sea life, often depicted as the ruler of Eternia's undersea kingdom. The original action figure had unpainted gloves and boots, unlike the series. The sword he used in the series is different to the "fishbone" sword that the figure came with.

According to designer Mark Taylor, Mer-Man's design was based on Bernie Wrighston's rendition of DC Comics character Swamp Thing.

Originally, Mer-Man was slated to appear the live-action film, but Mattel would not allow the filmmakers to kill off a character they had created. So, the filmmakers had to create Saurod.

In the 2002 action figure and Matty Collector action figure Mer-Man comes with a sword and a trident. In "Search for the VHO," he uses the trident on He-Man.

In the Masters of the Universe Classics storyline, Mer-Man ruled the undersea realms of Eternia until his kingdom was destroyed by rival ocean clans causing him to side with Skeletor.

In Masters of the Universe: Revelation, Mer-Man and his fellow Aquatican warriors attacked Teela's group during their quest to restore Eternia's magic. He was shown to have a closed right eye with a scar over it. Mer-Man voiced his disdain that Evil-Lyn did not bother to conquer Eternia while leaving the oceans to him. With help from Man-At-Arms, Teela's group defeated Mer-Man and his warriors where he was intimidated to let them pass.

Mer-Man is voiced by Alan Oppenheimer in the 1980s series, Scott McNeil in the 2002 series, Kevin Conroy in Masters of the Universe: Revelation, and George Takei in the 2021 series.

Comic Book Resources listed the character as part of He-Man: 15 Most Powerful Masters of the Universe.

==== Ninjor ====
Ninjor is a ninja warrior who works for Skeletor. He was never featured in the series because his figure was released after it ended.

In the Masters of the Universe Classics toyline where he was also called "Ninja Warrior," Ninjor came from another world when he was summoned by Skeletor to help defeat the Heroic Warriors until there was nobody else to help He-Man. What Skeletor does not know is that Ninjor secretly works for Horde Prime in order to find Skeletor's weak points and how to exploit them. Ninjor was mentioned in Slamurai's bio where he is an enemy of Slamurai.

==== Saurod ====
Saurod is a reptilian who can emit sparks out of his mouth.

He is featured in the 1987 film assisting Blade, Beast Man, and Karg into retrieving the Cosmic Key. Saurod is vaporized by Skeletor as penalty for the group's failure. He does not speak in the film and his name is pronounced by Evil-Lyn as "Saraad".

His action figure has been the source of controversy with claims that it should not be given to a very young child because the sparks that come out of his mouth are a potential fire hazard.

In the Masters of the Universe Classics toyline, Saurod's bio identifies him as C'Ngrel Chouluth, a Klybian Lizard Man from the planet Draphnos who rode a meteor shower to Eternia after escaping from Prison Starr. As one of the three reptilian species that were spliced with Snake Man DNA, Saurod became an enemy of King Hiss and sided with Skeletor. It was stated that during the Second Ultimate Battleground, Saurod slew Sssqueeze and Snake Face. Saurod also tried to steal the Cosmic Key from Gwildor to go back in time to prevent the dilution of his species.

Saurod was performed by Pons Maar in the 1987 live-action film.

==== Scare Glow ====
Scare Glow is a skeleton ghost warrior, who seems to have a solid but translucent body, and whose bones emit a strong glow which can intimidate even the bravest opponents. He wears a long purple cape, and there is a small crack on the forehead of his cranium. He carries a scythe, which is often called the 'Scythe of Doom'.

Scare Glow was introduced into the toy line in 1987. His action figure is notable for its 'glow-in-the-dark' special feature, the bones glowing when positioned in a dark space.

Labeled as the "Evil Ghost of Skeletor", he refers to himself as the Ghost of Skeletor in the minicomic, Scare Glow was packaged with the minicomic "The Search for Keldor". In this comic he is summoned to Eternia by Skeletor using a magic spell to call forth the most evil beings of space and time, although it is never stated which time period or dimension Scare Glow originates from. He is sent out with Ninjor on a mission to attack the Heroic Warriors with the power of his glow. He uses the glow to overpower Prince Adam, evoking in him so much fear that he is even too scared to change into He-Man. However, he is ousted from Adam's path by Clamp Champ, giving Adam the time to change into He-Man and subsequently defeat him.

It has become one of the most sought after and hardest to find figures by fans. Scare Glow was one of the last figures released. As fewer figures were selling by this late stage, production numbers had been reduced, making this figure rarer as a result. On auction sites such as eBay, loose figures have been sold for as much as $100 and the mint condition never opened package Scare Glow has been sold as high as $1,200 USD. The last version issued with the glow in the dark Halberd accessory (versus the more common Halberd made of non-glowing green plastic) is the rarest and hardest-to-find version of this figure.

Because he is one of the last figures to be released in Mattel's toy line, Scare Glow never appeared in the accompanying Filmation series, which had been discontinued by this time, and his appearances throughout all media are minimal. He has a major appearance in the story "Enter the Ninjor" in issue #11 of the UK Adventure Magazine, which gives him an origin as a being of pure light energy, created by Skeletor in his own image. Invisible in the light, but not in the dark, he is sent out with Ninjor to mount a series of silent, unseen attacks on He-Man and Fisto as they explore Viper Tower. His origin as a magical creation of Skeletor is taken from a promotional card provided by Mattel to the publishers of various story media. A similar story of Scare Glow coming from another dimension summoned by Skeletor is told in an issue of Marvel's Star Comics, Masters of the Universe series.

Although he is not featured in the 2002 relaunch of the Masters of the Universe franchise, Scare Glow is used in the comic series from MV Creations. He appears in a special Halloween comic "The Power of Fear" that was given away free at the 2003 Children Affected by AIDS Foundation (CAAF) fundraiser, and sold in comic shops to raise additional donations to the CAAF. The story features Scare Glow as a character from another dimension who is summoned by Skeletor to use his powers against the Masters.

In the Masters of the Universe Classics toyline, Scare Glow is a shifty bounty hunter named Nul who tried to obtain the secrets of Castle Grayskull. In death, his spirit was cursed and banished to the dimension of Infinita until a magical spell of light cast by Skeletor freed him. While being provided with a scythe, Nul became Scare Glow and allied with Skeletor.

In Masters of the Universe: Revelation, Scare Glow ruled a part of Eternia's underworld.

Scare Glow was voiced by Tony Todd in Masters of the Universe: Revelation and Masters of the Universe: Revolution.

==== Screeech ====
Screeech is a barbaric bird who acts as a spy for Skeletor.

In the 1983 series, Screeech is robotic. It is replaced by a bird-like levitating device called a Doomseeker in the 2002 series which is used by Tri-Klops to increase the range of his vision-powers and spy on the Heroic Warriors.

==== Skeletor ====
Skeletor is the main antagonist of He-Man. In the original illustrated books and in the Filmation series, Skeletor is an evil demon from another dimension. A later Mattel minicomic implies that he was once Keldor, brother of King Randor, which was in fact intended. The 2002 series and related materials confirm that Skeletor was once a blue-skinned man named Keldor, though the series itself established no familial connection prior to its cancellation, his connection to Randor was heavily implied. The later DVD releases of the series featured bios, confirming ultimately that the show's creators conceived of Keldor as Randor's half-brother.

The only main difference between Skeletor in the series and on the figure is there is no green on his face in the series, nor red glow in his eyes, unlike that of the figure. The original Skeletor figures wore boots designed for clawed feet. This feature was omitted in Skeletor and a number of other evil warriors in the Filmation series. Later, he was depicted with ordinary human feet with long, pointed claws on them.

Skeletor was voiced by Alan Oppenheimer in the 1980s series (recycling the voice he used for Ming the Merciless in Filmation's previous series Flash Gordon), Campbell Lane in the 1990s series, Brian Dobson in the 2002 series, Mark Hamill in Masters of the Universe: Revelation and Masters of the Universe: Revolution, and Benjamin Diskin in the 2021 series. In the 1987 live-action film, Skeletor is portrayed by Frank Langella. In the 2026 live action remake, Jared Leto portrayed the character.

==== Panthor ====
Panthor is Skeletor's evil feline companion, a giant purple panther creature called a Dilynx who serves as an evil counterpart to Battle Cat. He would usually be seen by his master's side in his lair or carrying Skeletor into battle against He-Man and Battle Cat.

In the Masters of the Universe Classics toyline, Panthor was a cub by the time an exiled Keldor found him and Panthor had remained loyal to Keldor ever since.

==== Spikor ====
Spikor is a humanoid covered in spikes, and he has a trident for a left arm. He serves as Skeletor's blacksmith. Spikor was not featured prominently in the series because his figure was released when the series was drawing to a close and in the series, did not use the club that came with the figure. In the series, Spikor had normal arms in some episodes and the trident for his left arm in other episodes.

In the Masters of the Universe Classics toyline, Spikor was originally a blacksmith from Nordling named Kleffton who was fused with an enchanted suit of armor and a mystical trident when he tried to steal a sacred scroll from Nordling's high priests. After being banished, Kleffton was found by Skeletor who used his blacksmith skills to forge weapons.

Spikor was voiced by Lou Scheimer in the 1980s series and by Phil LaMarr in Masters of the Universe: Revelations.

In the 2026 film, Spikor is portrayed by James Apps. On 22 January 2026, a teaser trailer was released for the 2026 Masters of the Universe film, with Spikor featuring prominently in a battle scene.

Spikor was voted #10 in The 10 Most Unfortunate Masters Of The Universe Toys by Io9.

==== Stinkor ====
Stinkor is an anthropomorphic skunk with magical control over his own stench. His action figure used the same mold as Mer-Man, wore the same mold of armor as Mekaneck, and actually smelled of patchouli oil, one of only three scented toys Mattel produced (the others being Moss Man and also Perfuma from the She-Ra line).

Stinkor was first introduced in 1985 as an action figure from the He-Man and the Masters of the Universe toyline and came packaged with a minicomic entitled The Stench of Evil!. The Stinkor action figure had a semi-foul scent, giving it the distinction of being one of the few toys whose "action feature" was an odor. The Stinkor action figure was created by Mattel by re-using the mold of another villain in the Masters of the Universe line Mer-Man. The only differences between the Mer-Man and Stinkor action figures were that Stinkor was painted black and white, had different chest armor and was chemically treated with patchouli oil to smell musky.

Stinkor was presented to Lou Scheimer and other staff at Filmation for inclusion in the original Masters of the Universe series, but his questionable superpower kept him from ever making an appearance on television. According to Filmation staff when the description of Stinkor was read out at a meeting of the story editors, all of them burst out laughing and vowed never to use Stinkor in any episode script.

In the 2002 version, Stinkor was once a Pelezean named Odiphus who romanticized the lives of outlaws. The Sorceress tells that, in the time of the Great Unrest, Odiphus betrayed his people to Prahvus in the hopes of being accepted into the evil warlord's gang. Upon the warlord's defeat by the Sorceress, Odiphus was captured and about to be executed. The Sorceress intervened and Odiphus's life was spared, although he was punished and retains a grudge against his people. His first appearance is in the Eternian prison, gleeful over Kobra Khan's escape, although he is not named at that time. Through serendipity, an explosion he caused while meddling in Tri-Klops's lab fulfilled his dream of joining Skeletor's organization. The resulting mutations caused the furry creature to gain height, muscle, and the ability to speak in a humanoid manner. His stench is so awful (even to himself, but especially to Eternia's dragons) that a special armored suit was created for him to keep the smell as under control as possible. Some stink still escapes the suit, causing Skeletor and the other evil warriors to cover their noses and to treat Stinkor politely in order to get him out of the room as efficiently as possible.

The Masters of the Universe Classics toyline listed Odiphus as a Pelezean thief who maintained his connection with Prahvus and was exiled for his evil deeds. In addition, the accident in Tri-Klops's lab that transformed Odiphus into Stinkor remains intact.

Stinkor was voiced by Brian Drummond in the 2002 series and Jason Mewes in Masters of the Universe: Revelation.

Stinkor was voted #30 in 'the 36 Worst Action Figures From Iconic Toy Lines' by Cracked. Stinkor was voted #7 in 'the 12 Coolest Masters of the Universe Action Features' by Topless Robot. CBR voted Stinkor sixth-worst He-Man toy.

==== Trap Jaw ====
Trap Jaw is a weapons expert and cyborg with a metal jaw, which can bite through anything. In the minicomic originally packaged with Trap Jaw, "The Menace of Trap Jaw", he is a villain from another dimension that Skeletor invades in an attempt to enter Castle Grayskull. While Skeletor attempts to weaken the Castle's defenses, Trap Jaw, who is being pursued by authorities, slams into Skeletor and knocks him back through the dimensional portal to Eternia. Back on Eternia, Trap Jaw emerges from the Castle connected to its power by a magical cord. Both He-Man and Skeletor attempt to defeat Trap Jaw, but eventually realize that they must join their halves of the power sword to be strong enough to sever the magical cord connecting Trap Jaw to the Castle. The comic ends with Skeletor carrying the unconscious Trap Jaw back to Snake Mountain where he will become one of his minions.

Trap Jaw's origin is very different in the 2002 franchise. Originally a minion of Keldor's named Kronis, he became dissatisfied with his lords new regime when Keldor had been disfigured then remade after their failed usurpation of the Council of Elders by his Evil Horde. Falling out of favor because of this the warmonger was then cast out into the wastes of their domain but would vow revenge on his ex-liege. Doing so by gathering all the brigand factions situated within the Dark Hemisphere to lead a raid upon Snake Mountain. An assault which ended in disaster as Keldor; now going by the moniker of Skeletor had become more powerful than ever, easily decimating Kronis's army. The fatal bout with his former lord left Kronis hideously disfigured; nevertheless, Skeletor pressed him into his service as a subject of ridicule. Skeletor had Kronis's body rebuilt into a cybernetic augment by replacing his damaged humanoid right arm and lower jaw with mechanical parts (off-screen). Now going by the name Trap Jaw, the evil warrior would patiently serve for another chance at taking out his hated master. Later, the series demonstrates that the more metal he eats the stronger he becomes, and one episode focuses on a quest to eat the strongest chemical element in Eternia called Eternium (which was forged and guarded by a group of subterranean dwellers called the Kulatuks). He is defeated by getting tricked into eating a special alloy named Deterninum that weakens him. Both series depict Trap Jaw as bold but coarse.

In the Masters of the Universe Classics toyline, Kronis was an insane criminal from the dimension of Infinata who was freed by Keldor to bolster his ranks during the Great Unrest. Kronis tried to rise up against Skeletor only to have his jaw and right arm broken by him. Tri-Klops later salvaged Kronis and turned him into a cyborg with a metal jaw and robotic right arm.

Trap Jaw was voiced by Lou Scheimer in the 1980s series, Paul Dobson in the 2002 series, Diedrich Bader in Masters of the Universe: Revelation, and Roger Craig Smith in the 2021 series. In the 2026 film, he is portrayed by Sam C. Wilson.

==== Tri-Klops ====
Tri-Klops is an interdimensional bounty hunter and swordsman who can see in any direction. His eyes, which are on a rotating visor around his head, have different abilities in different versions; one common ability is the power to see through solid objects. He is also able to see in the dark and over long distances with his Night-vision and Dista-vision eyes. Tri-Klops wears the "Gammavision" ever since he was blinded in an accident. In both the 1983 and 2002 series, his eyes can also shoot energy bolts, although this is not commonly used in other material. Tri-Klops was one of Skeletor's chief henchmen, stoic and obedient, and was frequently featured in the Filmation series as having similar physical strength to He-Man.

The 2002 version depicts him as Skeletor's irritable inventor, with some cybernetic features to his appearance. According to the book Mastering the Universe, "Tri-Klops was a good guy" (p. 120) (Roger Sweet may have meant he was originally supposed to be good; ultimately the toyline and all media depicted him as an Evil Warrior). The original toy's product subtitle carried on all packaging and advertisements was "Evil & sees everything".

In the Masters of the Universe Classics toyline, Tri-Klops was an interdimensional bounty hunter and tracker named Scope who was recruited by Skeletor during the final days of the Great Unrest. When an accident left him blind, Scope wore a tri-optic visor to help him see. His three different eyes sport Gammavision, Distavision, Night Vision, and the ability to shoot optic blasts. Tri-Klops was also responsible for turning a broken Kronis into Trap-Jaw.

In Masters of the Universe: Revelation, Tri-Klops took part in Skeletor's large scale attack on Castle Grayskull, leading a group of Skelcons while flying one-man War-Sleds. Tri-Klops appeared to be enjoying himself, until his vehicle was shot down by Man-At-Arms and the Royal Guard who arrived to join the battle flying on their Sky-Sleds. Some time later after magic had all but left Eternia and Skeletor and He-Man were thought to be dead, Tri-Klops took advantage of the situation by condemning magic altogether and became a leader in the cult of Motherboard. Ironically, Tri-Klops used one of the few remaining magic items left on the planet to perform the ritual miracles of Motherboard. During this ceremony, Tri-Klops would catch electronic looking water that sprang from a large altar inside Snake Mountain in a magic goblet and force his followers to drink it. By doing so, they would instantly transform into cyborgs, with various limbs being replaced by mechanical weapons.

In the 2021 series, Tri-Klops is a surveillance and retrieval drone built by Kronis.

Tri-Klops was voiced by Lou Scheimer in the 1980s series, Paul Dobson in the 2002 series, Henry Rollins in Masters of the Universe: Revelation, and Kevin Smith in the 2021 series. In the 2026 film, Tri-Klops is portrayed by Kojo Attah.

==== Twistoid ====
Twistoid is a robotic minion of Skeletor. Skeletor stole the blueprints for the machine Man-At-Arms used to create Rotar and used the machine to create Twistoid. He and Rotar are rivals.

Twistoid did not appear in the animated series, which ceased production before his figure's debut. Twistoid was voted by Mania.com as the seventh most Crazy Masters of the Universe Figures.

In the Masters of the Universe Classics storyline, Twistoid was described to be an "Evil Energy Cyborg".

==== Two Bad ====
Two Bad is an Evil Warrior strategist with two heads that constantly argue among themselves. The UK comics name the two heads "Blue Face" and "Yellow Band".

He was never featured prominently in the 1980s series because it was drawing to a close by the time his figure was released. His only prominent appearance in the 1980s series was "Capture the Comet Keeper". This is because he was the replacement character in the episode working for Skeletor at Snake Mountain for Beast Man and Trap Jaw, who were going to feature in the episode, but Robert Lamb asked Arthur Nadel to replace them with Two Bad to make Mattel's newest figure releases more prominent in the series. The shield included with the figure did not appear in the series.

In the 2002 version, they were originally two rival bounty hunters named Tuvar and Baddhra who bickered constantly. They were both highly recommended to Skeletor by Whiplash. Tuvar and Baddhra were magically fused into one being by Skeletor after they were led to work together in destroying He-Man. Both sides blamed each other for their predicament. Two Bad becomes one (or two) of Skeletor's Evil Warriors and appears throughout the remainder of the series among Skeletor's henchmen. At one point, they tried to find a spell of separation from a man that Stinkor knew which was not the type of separation that they were hoping for as that spell nearly separated Eternia.

In the Masters of the Universe Classics toyline, the spell that was used on them by Skeletor was an unrepeatable spell.

In the 2021 series, Tuvar and Baddhra were first seen as members of King Randor's palace guards.

Two Bad was voiced by Lou Scheimer in the 1980s series, Brian Drummond and Mark Gibbon in the 2002 series, and Yuri Lowenthal and Fred Tatasciore in the 2021 series.

CBR voted Two Bad twelfth-worst He-Man toy.

==== Whiplash ====
Whiplash is an alligator-like creature whose tough hide and strong tail whip attacks is a formidable weapon. He is one of Skeletor's Evil Warriors. He did not have the toy's spear in the series (this only came with the figure) and, like Mer-Man and Tri-Klops, the character was initially planned to be a Heroic Warrior.

In the 2002 series, he betrayed his kind - the Caligar - when he sided with Skeletor.

In the Masters of the Universe Classics toyline, Whiplash started out as Torrant where Ceratus was his older brother and succeeded their father as King of the Caligars after his untimely death. Growing bitter, Torrant sided with Keldor and helped him in a raid on Randor's army during the Great Unrest. This plan failed and Torrant was banished from Subternia. Torrant became Whiplash and stayed by Keldor's side even when Keldor became Skeletor. Whiplash served as Skeletor's brute enforcer.

Whiplash was voiced by John Erwin in the 1980s series and Garry Chalk in the 2002 series.

==== Webstor ====
Webstor is a blue-skinned creature with the abilities of a spider. A two-bit thief who resembles a goblin with a grappling hook in the 1980s series. In the 1980s series, he never used the rifle included with the figure.

In the 2002 version, he is an Arachna, a spider-like race that are enemies of the Andreenids. He can spin webs, has spider-like legs sprouting from his back, and multiple eyes to make him more spider-like in this show. Webstor initially serves as part of Skeletor's Council of Evil, and is the only one not to abandon him. Webstor is beaten to near-death in his own lair by the Snake Men in "Web of Evil" so they may steal his ambrosia-enriched eggs. The Masters find his defeated body on the ground as he tells them what happened.

In the Masters of the Universe Classics toyline, Webstor was one of the last members of the Arachna who was awoken from his hibernation beneath Snake Mountain and sided with Skeletor. He is shown to be an accomplished escape artist, mathematician, and strategist. Just like the 2002 version, Webstor's action figure sports spider-like legs sprouting from his back.

Webstor was voiced by John Erwin in the 1980s series, Brian Dobson in the 2002 series, and Dee Bradley Baker in the 2021 series.

Webstor was voted #3 in "The 12 Coolest Masters of the Universe Action Features" by Topless Robot.

=== Modern toyline characters (200X) ===
==== Mutant Warrior ====
The Mutant Warrior was the only all-new toy-made character from the 2002 toyline until the appearance of the King Grayskull figure. It is a skeleton monster, with a hollow chest which can be filled with slime. It was included with the Mutant Slime Pit playset.

=== Classics toyline characters (2008–2018) ===
==== Gygor ====
Exclusive to the Classics toyline, Gygor is a super-strong gorilla-like creature with yellow fur and green skin who is the Lord of the Vine Jungle. Shortly after the Great Unrest and Keldor's forces being driven behind the Mystic Wall. Gygor led an army of Beast Men in a series of raids against Castle Grayskull, believing the many tales of its great and mysterious power. It was only through the combined powers of Oo-Larr and the Goddess that Gygor was defeated and placed in a state of suspended animation. Eventually, Hordak returned to Eternia and Gygor was freed by Evil-Lyn in her attempt to bolster Skeletor's forces against the new Horde army.

His toy is based on an unproduced prototype from the vintage Masters toyline.

==== Icer ====
Originating in the Filmation series, Icer is Skeletor's northern agent who can freeze someone and dissolve into water to get under tight spots. His only series appearance involved him raiding an arctic base to steal an invention called the Ice Raider that was guarded there after Whiplash failed to do the job in Eternos. Icer does not like heat.

Icer did not have a toy made of him until the collector-centric Masters of the Universe Classics series where he was depicted as originally living in Stilla just outside of the Ice Mountains. His history of targeting the Ice Raider remains intact.

Icer was voiced by John Erwin in the 1980s series.

==== Fang Man ====
Originating in the Filmation series, Fang Man is a dragonoid who appeared in one episode "The Time Corridor". He has power to control dragon-like creatures called Dragosaurs. He was left in the past with Tri-Klops and was never seen in another episode again, yet Tri-klops was. Some sources state that he is a Snake Man known as Fang-Shu. He is possibly the prototype of Kobra Khan of the Snake Men, who was released as a figure as he can squirt mist from his mouth.

He did not have a toy made of him until the Collector-centric Masters of the Universe Classics series which stated that he was evolved from an ancient Dragosaur species and confirmed that Fang Man was left in the past. The bio for that toy also states that Fang Man resides with his ancestors on Dragosaur Isle awaiting the return of Skeletor.

Fang Man was voiced by Lou Scheimer in the 1980s series.

==== Batros ====
Originating in the Filmation series, Batros is an anthropomorphic bat who resides on the dark side of Eternia. He has helped Skeletor out, although he is generally an independent villain and will not officially ally himself with any evil team.

Batros did not have a toy made of him, until the Masters of the Universe Classics line. He was from a race of half-man half-bat pirates from the Dark Hemisphere where he became a mercenary-for-hire who allied with Skeletor on occasion.

Batros was voiced by Lou Scheimer in the 1980s series.

The symbol over his chest straps strongly resembles the Horde's red bat-winged insignia. That and the fact that an origin episode for the Sorceress featuring three aliens wearing Horde uniforms and flying in Horde ships leads many to assume that he may have been one of several teasers for the upcoming She-Ra: Princess of Power series.

==== Strongarm ====
Originating in the Filmation series, Strongarm is a cyborg with a metal face and a long metal right arm with strength that can rival He-Man's. He only appeared in "She Demon of Phantos" where his notable scene had him trapping He-Man in a photanium body trap.

Strongarm did not have a toy made of him until the Collector-centric Masters of the Universe Classics series where he was referred to as Strong-Or. His bio in that toyline stated that Strongarm was originally Dalmus Fu, a photanium mines worker on Phantos who lost his right arm and parts of his face when a mechanical press folder malfunctioned. After being banished from Phantos by Queen Elmora for the photanium thefts where he used some of them to build a new face and right arm, he sided with Skeletor.

Strongarm was voiced by John Erwin in the 1980s series.

==== Draego-Man ====
A fire-breathing half-human half-dragon creature with flame weapons who was created by the Great Black Wizard, Draego-Man is one of Skeletor's newest Evil Warriors. After being shunned by Granamyr, Draego-Man sided with the people of Eternia. After the Truce of the Three Towers, Draego-Man became so disgusted with the humans that he chose to isolate himself within the Caverns of Rakash. Many millenniums later, Draego-Man came out of hiding where he sided with Skeletor in his plot to enslave the dragons and use them in the Evil Warriors' attack on the Royal Palace of Eternia.

Exclusive to the MOTU Classics toyline, he is also the only entirely new character that the Four Horsemen have created for Masters of the Universe.

==== Goat Man ====
Originated in the Golden Books story "Secret of the Dragon's Egg", Goat Man is a wild goat-headed ally of Beast Man where he accompanied him in Skeletor's search for a dragon's egg. Both of them were fended of by Fisto.

According to his 2014 Classics action figure packaging, Klacky is a member of the G'hoat Men from the Northern Mountains where his kind are one of the only intelligent upright races that is susceptible to the hypnotic powers of the Beast Men. Like most of his species, Klacky was captured by the rulers of the Vine Jungle and simply called "Goat Man" by his beastly masters. Eventually, he found himself in the service of Beast Man and was forced to serve in the Second Ultimate Battle. Here, he was severely wounded by Buzz-Off and left at the foot of Central Tower. Crawling inside, Goat Man fell into a time portal and was transported to the future arriving on Eternia when King He-Man ruled the land and his son Dare wielded the Power Sword. Forced to serve an aging Beast Man in this new time, Goat Man is forever following whatever evil orders he is given.

In Masters of the Universe: Revelation, Goat Man is among the Evil Warriors by Evil-Lyn to Castle Grayskull. He accompanied Pigboy in fighting Teela, Duncan, and Andreena in the dungeons where Duncan called them the "bottom of the barrel". Both of them chased Duncan and Andra into the dungeon.

Goat Man is voiced by Kevin Smith in Masters of the Universe: Revelation.

Goat Man made his live-action debut in the 2026 film, portrayed by Hafthor Bjornsson and voiced by Kellen Goff.

==== Anti-Eternia He-Man ====
Debuting in the Masters of the Universe Classics toyline, the Anti-Eternia He-Man is a He-Man from an alternate Eternia called Anti-Eternia where he is an overlord who evokes the Powers of Hellskull. Using the World Converter, Skeletor summoned Anti-Eternia He-Man to Eternia. Because Anti-Eternia He-Man threw him out of Snake Mountain and fought He-Man, Skeletor and Man-At-Arms had to work together to dismantle the World Converter in order to send Anti-Eternia He-Man back to Anti-Eternia.

==== Hover Robots ====
In the Filmation series, Skeletor used dozens of these floating mechanical minions called Hover Robots to bolster his Evil Warriors. Their claw-like hands could spin like saw blades, but they were no match for the might of He-Man.

A set of three Hover Robots action figures were released in 2015 as part of the Masters of the Universe Classics toyline. Based on the designs that were pilfered from Hordak, Skeletor used them against King Randor's forces and are more agile than the Horde Troopers. The Hover Robots wield different weapons like laser rifles, blade blasters, and net lassos as well as being able to self-destruct.

==== Karg ====
Karg (portrayed by Robert Towers) is a half-human, half-bat minion of Skeletor with a hook for a left hand. Karg commands Skeletor's Robot Centurions. He appeared in the 1987 live-action film in a role that was originally intended for Trap Jaw.

Karg gained an action figure in 2018 as part of the Masters of the Universe Classics toyline. His bio states that Karg is Skeletor's interrogator at Snake Mountain and is served by the Mintoran cyborg Minox. In addition, Karg also works as a bounty hunter and has developed a liking for Lieutenant Andra of the Eternian Royal Guard. While the normal Karg figure states that his species is unknown, the Commander Karg figure states that he is the descendant of an inbred Spelean.

Karg made a reappearance in the 2026 reboot after 39 years portrayed by Hung Dante Dong.

=== Film-exclusive villains ===
Created for the 1987 live-action film, none of these characters had toys made of them.

- Robot Centurions – A group of robots that serve as Skeletor's foot soldiers in the 1987 live-action film.
- Comtechs – Comtechs are a group of computer technicians who serve Skeletor. They only appear in the live-action film and were not referred to by name nor credited. A character who may or may not be a Comtech appears in the 2003 comic "Icons of Evil: Tri-Klops."

== The Horde ==
The Horde is an intergalactic organization of supervillainous monsters, robots, and sorcerers on Etheria who occupy the land on behalf of their leader, Horde Prime. The Fright Zone serves as their base of operations, with connections on both Etheria and Eternia. While the mysterious Horde Prime is the supreme ruler of the Evil Horde, the technomancer Hordak is its operational commander, and the former mentor of Skeletor. For a list of other Horde members, see: List of She-Ra: Princess of Power and She-Ra and the Princesses of Power characters.

=== Key members ===
==== Hordak ====
Hordak (Hor-dak) is Skeletor's old master, She-Ra's archenemy, and the Horde's ruthless cyborg commander who conquered most of the planet Etheria. According to most story media, Skeletor betrayed Hordak and trapped him in "another dimension" before beginning his own conquest of the planet Eternia. Hordak, not to be outdone, then returned with a vengeance to take over Eternia for himself. In this series, he rules the planet of Etheria with an army of Horde Troopers, most of whom wear a red bat symbol on their chests to convey their allegiance. In the 1980s series, Hordak is a cyborg who can alter his shape, most often into that of a rocket to make a quick get-away. In the Masters of the Universe comics Hordak also tries to conquer Eternia, making him a frequent adversary of both He-Man and Skeletor. Hordak is notoriously short-tempered, often abusing his minions (Mantenna in particular, with Hordak constantly sending him down a trap door in his throne room). Despite being evil, Hordak has a sense of humor.

However, in the 2002 series, Hordak wished to rule over all of Eternia. After he and his minions defeated the Snake Men, Hordak turned his attention to Castle Grayskull and launched an attack against it. He was defeated by King Grayskull, who banished Hordak and his forces to the Abyss and entrapped them in a dimension within. Somehow, ages later, Hordak became Skeletor's master, despite the dimensional differences. Hordak saves Keldor's life after he is mortally injured battling Randor; in saving his life, Hordak transformed Keldor into Skeletor and told him there would one day be a price to pay for Hordak's assistance. Later in the series, Evil-Lyn and Count Marzo attempt to release Hordak from his dimensional prison.

Unlike his former pupil Skeletor, Hordak prefers to place his reliance on science and technology, rather than magic. He suffered no fools and expected the highest standards of excellence from his minions, rewarding them when they succeeded and punishing them severely when they failed.

Hordak serves as the main antagonist for the first four seasons of the 2018 reboot She-Ra and the Princesses of Power. He also makes a cameo appearance in the 2021 He-Man and the Masters of the Universe as Evil-Lyn's father.

His face is a pale flesh color on the figure but pure white in the series. Initially, the figure did not have the left cannon arm as he did in the series. The figure just had two normal arms. However, later variants of Hordak gave him a variety of cyborg-like mechanical gimmicks, reminiscent of the shape-changing powers he displayed in the 1980s series.

Hordak is voiced by George DiCenzo in the 1980s series, Colin Murdock in the 2002 He-Man series, Keston John in the 2018 She-Ra series, and Keith David in the 2021 He-Man series.

Hordak served as the namesake for a monster in Stranger Things: Tales from '85.

In February 2017, Comic Book Resources ranked the character third among "Eternia's 15 Mightiest Villains".

== The Snake Men ==
The Snake Men are another evil faction, who sought to conquer Eternia in its ancient past, and after centuries of imprisonment are brought to the present with a vengeance.

The Masters of the Universe Classics toyline states that the Snake Men were created from the DNA splicing of three cold-blooded alien races (like the Klybian Lizard Men) and were bred by the Unnamed One.

=== Fang-Or ===
First appearing in the Masters of the Universe Classics toyline, Fang-Or is a vicious Snake Man who can regrow his fangs after launching them like knives in battle. He became a mechanical expert after assisting the Snake Man form of Man-At-Arms where he built the Rattle Trap for King Hiss.

=== King Hiss ===
Ruler of the Snake Men, King Hiss can shed his human-like "skin" to become a twisting mass of five headed Hydra/Shesha-like snakes from the waist up. In the 2002 series, The Sorceress describes King Hiss as wielding magic as great of that of the Elders. King Hiss was defeated by Hordak and his minions in the times of King Grayskull. Ages later, King Hiss and his henchmen were sealed away beneath Snake Mountain (which Hiss built) by Zodak, to be released during the reign of King Randor by Kobra Khan, General Rattlor, and Evil-Lyn.

King Hiss appeared in the game He-Man: The Most Powerful Game in the Universe.

In the Masters of the Universe toyline, King Hiss is a servant of the Unnamed One who leads the Snake Men into invading Eternia in order to steal its secrets. After being betrayed by Hordak and banished to the void by Zodac, King Hiss did a ritual where he used to the Staff of Ka to have the evil deities transform him into a serpent demigod. King Hiss was released 5,000 years later until the Snake Men were freed by Evil-Lyn and a Snake Man descendant named Kobra Khan. The toyline had figures for King Hiss and his transformed appearance that was called "Serpentine King Hiss".

King Hiss was voiced by Brian Dobson in the 2002 series.

King Hiss was voted #11 in The 14 Least Masterful Masters of the Universe by Io9. Comic Book Resources listed the character as part of He-Man: 15 Most Powerful Masters of the Universe. IGN recommended that King Hsss be a character introduced into any potential Masters of the Univerese film franchise. King Hsss was voted 7th in 'the 7 Stupidest He-Man Characters' by Total Film.

=== Kobra Khan ===
Kobra Khan is a cobra-like Snake Man whose character pre-dates the introduction of the Snake Men. He appears as one of Skeletor's Evil Warriors in the He-Man and the Masters of the Universe animated series, in which he sprays a sleeping gas, and on one occasion, is shown to have stretchable arms similar to the Sssqueeze character. In the series, the gas came from vents in his hood, which he kept down any time he was not using this ability. The action figure and minicomics portrayed the character spraying this gas from his mouth. The toy had a mechanism that converted water to vapor similar to many kinds of spray bottles.

In the 2002 animated series, he instead sprays acid. The cunning and silver-tongued Kobra Khan is fanatically devoted to King Hiss at the expense of loyalty to his erstwhile allies, earning him resentment. He freed General Rattlor in his first attempt to release his monarch. The other Snake Men would often try to get Kobra Khan to prove himself to be a true Snake-Man by eating a human. In the event that someone is hit in the eyes with Kobra Khan's acid attack, a special spray can be used to counter it.

In the Mattel minicomics and UK comics, Kobra Khan shares a dual-allegiance to Skeletor and King Hiss.

In the Masters of the Universe Classics toyline, Kobra Khan was a Snake Man descendant who broke into Eternos Palace's archives to learn about the Void that the Snake Men were banished into. Faking an alliance with Skeletor, Kobra Khan and Evil-Lyn acquired Zodak's staff and freed the Snake Men. Kobra Khan went on to serve King Hiss. The toyline also had a "Camo Khan" action figure which was a form of Kobra Khan who took over the Snake Men after King Hiss was beheaded by Zodak and feigned surrender to Skeletor. With the Snake Men on his side, Skeletor enchanted Kobra Khan with camouflage abilities which came in handy when secretly helping to speed up King Hiss's recovery at the Temple of Serpos.

Kobra Khan was voiced by Lou Scheimer in the 1980s series and Scott McNeil in the 2002 series.

Kobra Khan was voted #5 in The 12 Coolest Masters of the Universe Action Features by Topless Robot. Comic Book Resources listed the character as He-Man: Eternia's 15 Mightiest Villains. Kobra Khan was ranked the fifth-smartest Masters of the Universe villain by Screen Rant. Comic Book Resources listed the character as 'He-Man: Eternia's 15 Mightiest Villains'.

=== Lord Gr'asp ===
First appearing in the Masters of the Universe Classics toyline, Gr'asp is a viper-like Snake Man with a crushing crab-like claw for a right-hand who is a master strategist. He was originally an elite general of the Unnamed One until he escapes from the Nameless Dimension. After forming an alliance with Horde Prime, he persuaded him to destroy the Kaydex Crystal that kept the Unnamed One trapped in the Nameless Dimension. It was Lord Gr'asp that persuaded Hordak and King Hiss to work together.

=== Megator ===
Megator was a green giant from Preternia. The original toy was one of the few releases in The Powers of Grayskull spin-off line. It was only sold in Italy.

His modern Masters of the Universe Classics action figure packaging states that he originally served Hordak during Preternian times and was resurrected by King Hiss after his death to serve the Snake Men in the modern day.

=== Rattlor ===
One of King Hiss's generals, Rattlor is a rattlesnake-like Snake Man who possesses an extending neck and rattling tail.

Rattlor appears in the She-Ra: Princess of Power animated series as a member of the Horde, as the He-Man series ended when his figure was made.

In the 2002 animated series, Rattlor is presented as the General of the Snake Men army trying to release their leader, King Hiss. He was released by Kobra Khan but later recaptured and held in the Eternian prison. Gen. Rattlor nursed a grudge against Kobra Khan for being left to this fate, escaping only by outwitting Roboto. He retains a primordial fear of mongooses.

In the Masters of the Universe Classics toyline, Rattlor's history of being the first to escape imprisonment remains intact. Kobra Khan would later manipulate King Hiss into demoting Rattlor who would defect to the Evil Horde.

Rattlor was voiced by Lou Scheimer in the 1980s series and Richard Newman in the 2002 series.

=== Snake Face ===
Snake Face is a gorgon-like Snake Man. Snakes extend from his face, chest and shoulders to "petrify" opponents (just like Medusa of Greek mythology).

He only appears in the 1980s comics and 2002 animated series because the original animated series had ended by the time his figure was released. During the return of the Snake Men, Snake Face was beaten by He-Man who used his sword as a mirror and turned Snake Face's power back on him, turning him to stone. The petrified Snake Face is seen later in the Eternian prison. In the episode 40 comic "Captured," it is shown that Snake Men can recover from even mortal injuries when they are in total darkness, as both the stone Snake Face and the decapitated King Hiss were taken to Snake Mountain where Skeletor's minion Beast Man inadvertently allowed King Hiss to heal himself. This implies that Snake Face too would eventually have been restored to normal.

In the Masters of the Universe Classics toyline, Snake Face was originally Cyltho Ssstavvve who gained his petrifying abilities from the Great Black Wizard. Snake Face's petrification abilities impressed King Hiss enough to recruit him into his army as part of the Snake Men's inner circle.

Snake Face was voiced by Paul Dobson in the 2002 series.

=== Sssqueeze ===
Sssqueeze is an anaconda-like Snake Man who possesses long snake-like arms.

He only appears in the 2002 version of the series because the original 1980s series ended when his figure was released. In the 2002 series, the palms of his hands became snake-like heads when Sssqueeze's arms are extended. Sssqueezes is sometimes called Tanglor in certain media, which was his original prototype name.

In the Masters of the Universe Classics toyline, Sssqueeze was original Shazzz. He serves as one of King Hiss's chief lieutenants.

Sssqueeze was voiced by Brian Dobson in the 2002 series.

Sssqueeze was ranked No. 9 in 10 Weird Masters Of The Universe Action Figures From The 1980s.

=== Terroar ===
First appearing the Masters of the Universe Classics toyline, Terroar is a sound being from Melodian who was exiled for his evil deeds. When the spacecraft containing him crashed into Eternia's Ice Mountains, he was inert for a millennia until a skirmish between the Evil Warriors, the Horde, and the Snake Men freed them. Terroar systematically assimilated the characteristics of their warriors where he assumed a purple-skinned hybrid appearance where he has the head of Whiplash, the extending neck, torso, left arm, and tail of Rattlor, the right arm and shoulder of Trap Jaw, and the legs and boots of Mosquitor. The Evil Warriors, the Horde, and the Snake Men confronted Terroar who unleashed his devastating roar that brought them to their knees. King Hiss became impressed with Terroar's talents and prevented Quick Flick from slaying him. Lord Gr'asp later found Terroar in the Ice Valley of Death. Upon remembering King Hiss's kindness, Terroar sided with the Snake Men. Plasmor, Slamurai, and Strobo later discovered that Terroar had a weakness to prolonged light exposure.

=== Tung Lashor ===
Tung Lashor is a python-like Snake Man who possesses a super-long extending tongue. He appears in the She-Ra: Princess of Power animated series as a member of the Horde. The original He-Man series had ceased production when his figure was released.

In the 2002 animated series Masters of the Universe vs. The Snakemen, Tung Lashor is a member of the Snake Men. A recurring gag in the 2002 series is that Tung Lashor's tongue would occasionally get cut off and grow back by the next appearance.

In the 2018 animated series She-Ra and the Princesses of Power, Tung Lashor is leader of the Crimson Wasteland Snake Men before he was defeated by Catra who left him in quicksand and took his men.

In the Masters of the Universe Classics toyline, Tung Lashor is depicted as having venom on this tongue. Like Rattlor, Tung Lashor defected to the Evil Horde.

Tung Lashor was voiced by George DiCenzo in the 1980s series, Michael Donovan in the 2002 series, and Jake Eberle in She-Ra and the Princesses of Power.

=== Rattle-Hood ===
Rattle-Hood is a cobra/rattlesnake-like Snake Man who originated in the Masters of the Universe Origins toyline. He serves as the squad leader for the Snake Men.

=== Gorgon ===
Gorgon is a Snake Man who originated in the Masters of the Universe Origins toyline. He serves as King Hiss' loyal spy. Aka in Greek Mythology as Pegasus (the son of Medusa from the Gorgon family) or in the Bible as Beelzebub, King of the Flies, a high ranking demon.

=== Naga ===
Naga is a Snake Man who originated in the Masters of the Universe Origins toyline. He is the Snake Men's master of poison.

=== Snake Man Infiltrator ===
The Snake Man Infiltrator is a Snake Man.

He first appeared in the comic "The Fading Fortress" where he posed as a Royal Guard named Otto.

The Snake Man Infiltrator later got his own action figure in the Masters of the Universe Origins toyline.

=== Reptilax ===
Reptilax is a Snake Man.

Reptiliax first appeared in the "King of the Snake Men" and "Eternia Remastered" mini-comics.

Reptilax later got his own action figure in the Masters of the Universe Origins toyline. His design consists of a recolored version of Fang Man's head (minus the ears), neck piece, and hands, the torso, shoulder, and left bicep of He-Man, the right forearm of Two-Bad, the left forearm of Oo-Larr, the upper legs and calves of King Hiss, the boots from Two-Bad's Tuvar side, and the feet of Laser Light Skeletor.

=== Necro-Conda ===
Necro-Conda is an undead Snake Man soldier who originated in the Masters of the Universe Origins toyline. He was created from the sheded skins of the Snake Men by Lady Slither.

=== Vypor ===
Vypor is a viper-like Snake Man who originated in the Masters of the Universe Origins toyline. He was the predecessor of King Hiss who considered Vypor a fool for making peace with the enemy.

His design consists of the reused shoulders, biceps, and torso of Snake Face, the forearms, hands, and legs of Lord Dactyus, and the loincloth of Prahvus.

=== Lady Slither ===
Lady Slither is a female leader of the Snake Men who can transform her lower legs into a snake tail.

Lady Slither later got her own action figure in the Masters of the Universe Origins toyline.

=== Golden Rod ===
Golden Rod is a golden robot created by the Snake Men to serve them.

Golden Rod's concept art was revealed in the Masters of the Universe Origins. His design consists of the reused head of Roboto, the neck piece, one of the torsos, shoulders, biceps, forearms, and legs of Multi-Bot, the hands of a Horde Trooper, and the force field rod of Fang Man.

=== Quick Flick ===
Quick Flick is a member of the Snake Men who is an expert archer.

Quick Flick's concept art was revealed in Masters of the Universe Origins. His design consists of the reused arms and legs of Mantenna, the loincloth of Lizard Man, and the feet of Modulok.

=== Strettch Nek ===
Strettch Nek is a long-necked member of the Snake Men.

Strettch Nek's concept art was revealed in Masters of the Universe Origins. His design consists of the reused arms, legs, and loincloth of Whiplash.

=== Snake Man Soldiers ===
In addition to his key lieutenants, King Hiss also has a huge army of slithering minions willing to do his bidding. The 2002 series featured the full force of the Snake Men and two action figures based on these generic warriors (one yellow, one orange) were released in 2012 for Mattel's Masters of the Universe Classics toyline.

=== Snake Troopers ===
First appearing in the Masters of the Universe Classics toyline, the Snake Troopers are the results of some Snake Men Warriors that were with Lord Gr'asp being subjected to Horde World science where they were lobotomized, turned into cyborgs, and hooked up to the central computer brain of the Horde Troopers. The Snake Troopers were used in Lord Gr'asp's plans to have the Snake Men partner up with the Horde.

=== Pit Warden ===
The Pit Wardens are Hydra-themed Snake Men with a horned snake-like head and neck for a left arm that originate in the Masters of the Universe Origins toyline. They are known for their unrelenting viciousness and their difficulty at being destroyed. If a Pit Warden loses its head, two more grow in its place.

== The New Adventures of He-Man characters (1989–1992, 2010–2015) ==
=== Galactic Guardians ===
==== Hydron ====
Hydron is an undersea commander and the captain of Starship Eternia.

A Masters of the Universe Classics figure of Hydron was released in 2014.

==== Flipshot ====
Flipshot is a space pilot from the cloud city of Levitan. He is also known as Icarius in the toyline.

A Masters of the Universe Classics figure of Icarius was released in 2011.

==== Mara of Primus ====
Mara is an assistant of Master Sebrian, ambassador of the planet Primus, and eventually becomes the leader of the Galactimytes.

She has her hair in a long braid, with a spiked metal ball at the end which she uses as a weapon. A prototype action figure was created but not put into production.

In 2015, a new figure of Mara was released as part of the Masters of the Universe Classics toyline.

Mara of Primus also appears to have been the inspiration for the Mara character in the 2018 She-Ra and the Princesses of Power series, although no official link between the characters has yet been made.

=== Space Mutants ===
==== Flogg ====
Flogg is the leader of the Evil Mutants of Denebria. Flogg is a military commander of the Mutant Armada which he commands from the Mutant Mothership. Skeletor forges an alliance with Flogg where Skeletor will help him take over Primus in exchange for Flogg helping to destroy He-Man. By the end of the series, Flogg surrenders and ends up signing a peace treaty between Primus and Denebria. He is also called Brakk in the toyline's European release.

A Masters of the Universe Classics figure of Flogg was released in 2014.

==== Slush Head ====
Slush Head is an incompetent amphibious mutant with cybernetic tentacles. He serves as Flogg's second-in-command and the co-pilot of the Mutant Mothership. Slush Head comes from the Quagmi Swamp, a place on Denebria that most other Mutants find disgusting because of its deadly creatures and foul stench. In the toyline, he is also called Kalamarr.

A Masters of the Universe Classics figure of Slush Head was released in 2012. He is also the only mutant who is married.

==== Optikk ====
Optikk is a cyborg with a single giant eyeball for a head.

A Masters of the Universe Classics figure of Optikk was released in 2010.

==== Karatti ====
Karatti is a green-skinned mutant with deadly martial arts skills who is often paired with Hoove.

A Masters of the Universe Classics figure of Karatti was released in 2013.

== Other villains associated with MOTU ==
Skeletor, Hordak, and King Hiss are not the only threats to Eternia. There are many independent and freelance villains who have made their own attempts at threatening the peace on Eternia.

=== Count Marzo ===
Count Marzo is a powerful sorcerer who has lived for thousands of years with no greater desire than to become King of Eternia. He concocts his evil schemes more subtly than most villains and often entices children, into aiding his plots. He was never made as a figure in the 1980s.

In the 1980s series, Count Marzo first appeared in "The Once and Future Duke" where he reverted Teela's friend David (who is also Count Marzo's nephew) to a child and wiped his memory to keep him from becoming Duke of Athra. In addition, he is served by Chimera. He-Man was able to defeat Count Marzo. In "The Eternia Flower," Count Marzo tricks Jahno into giving him an Eternian Flower which he uses to turn Jahno's friends against him and gather an army of children. After the Wolfbats he unleashed on He-Man are defeated, Count Marzo and Chimera flee to their home planet of Eronia to continue mass-producing the Eternian Flower. He-Man thwarted their plans and defeated them. In "Search for a Son," Mekaneck learns that Count Marzo had rescued his son Philip from a storm in the forest. Count Marzo manipulates Mekaneck into leading King Randor and Queen Marlena to an oasis where he captures them. He-Man defeats Count Marzo and Chimera, but they get away.

In the 2002 series, Count Marzo is a barbaric wizard with an Eastern European accent. His powers come from a magenta crystal that makes up his amulet. Deprived of his powers and affected by the magic of the Council of Elders, he becomes a hunched and wizened peasant. Several times in the 2002 series, Marzo's amulet is taken away from him, only to be returned later. Marzo aids Evil-Lyn with her plan to restore Hordak in exchange for his amulet, which Evil-Lyn possesses. This plot was thwarted by He-Man, though Count Marzo escapes.

A toy was released in 2010 based on his newer design as part of the Masters of the Universe Classics toyline. His bio lists him as a 5th degree wizard from the Dunes of Doom and led the warriors of the Dark Hemisphere in fighting the armies of Miro. Count Marzo was listed in the bios of Nepthu and Prahvus where they had connections with him. In addition, Count Marzo was the one who created the Shadow Beasts as revealed in its toy bio.

Comic Book Resources listed the character as He-Man: Eternia's 15 Mightiest Villains. Comic Book Resources voted Count Marzo the seventh-most-useless He-Man character to ever appear on screen.

Count Marzo was voiced by John Erwin in the 1980s series and Michael Donovan in the 2002 series.

=== Evilseed ===
Evilseed is an evil plant man who can control plants.

In the 1980s series, He-Man and Skeletor team up to stop him.

In the 2002 series, he is an evil rival to Moss Man who was imprisoned in the Root Cellar by Moss Man until the day when Evilseed tricked Orko.

An action figure based on the 2002 version of Evilseed was released in 2015 as part of the Masters of the Universe Classics toyline. His bio states that he was created by Moss Man and went rogue.

Evilseed was voiced by John Erwin in the 1980s series and Don Brown in the 2002 series.

=== Prahvus ===
Prahvus is an evil grey-skinned warlord with horns and blue tattoo-like markings. He only appeared in the 2002 series, attempting to conquer Eternia during a time known as the Great Unrest. He had many weapons and an entire army of his own. On one of these plots, he attacked Pelezia upon being brought there by Odiphus. Prahvus was defeated by the Sorceress of Castle Grayskull, sometime before she gave birth to Teela.

In the Masters of the Universe Classics toyline, Prahvus's bio mentioned that he was originally imprisoned in a magical lamp until he was freed by Count Marzo to help fight Miro during the Great Unrest. He was defeated by Keldor who imprisoned him in the magical lamp again. Decades later, Hordak found the magical lamp containing Prahvus where two of his minions freed him and he was enthralled by Hordak's chief witch.

=== Shokoti ===
Shokoti is an extremely powerful undead sorceress who resides in the Sands of Time. She has a rather demonic appearance, with a horned headdress, jet-black hair, pale bluish skin and black, lifeless eyes. Her sole episode, "The House of Shokoti, part 2", is considered one of the darkest episodes in the series.

In 2013, a figure of Shokoti along with one of her Darklings were made into toy form in the Masters of the Universe Classics line.

Shokoti was voiced by Linda Gary in the 1980s series.

=== Nepthu ===
The evil sorcerer Nepthu originally appeared in the Filmation episode "Temple of The Sun".

He was released in action figure form in the Masters of the Universe Classics toyline in 2013. His bio mentioned that he used to work for Count Marzo until he was transformed into a helpless man. Nepthu later sided with King Hiss during the Second Ultimate Battle Ground.

Nepthu was voiced by Alan Oppenheimer in the 1980s series.

=== Geldor ===
Geldor is a barbarian who appeared in the minicomic "The Secret Liquid of Life".

A fan favourite, he was voted into the Masters of the Universe Classics toyline as the 2013 Fan's Choice action figure. He is the ruler of the Dark Hemisphere location of Foodar who was looking for ways to extend his lifespan ever since his wife was killed by a dragon. When Geldor heard about the Secret Liquid of Life and kidnapped Vaderia's chief vizier Torgle, Prince Dakon called upon He-Man for help. When the liquid spilled in Ogre Mountain during the conflict, a tree rose up and swallowed Geldor. Months later, Geldor returned where he was merged with the magic of the tree and was more powerful than ever.

=== Plundor ===
An evil rabbit-man motivated purely by greed, Plundor first appeared in the Filmation series. He conquered the planet Trannis with his army of robots, turning its lush environment into a wasteland, all because he wanted to plunder its natural resources for profit.

A Plundor action figure was released in the Masters of the Universe Classics toyline in 2013. He was listed as a genius inventor who sought out ways to increase his riches. When an amnesiac He-Man was sent to the planet Draedus by Skeletor's magic, he came to the aid of its inhabitants by returning its lifeforce and defeating Plundor.

Plundor was voiced by John Erwin in the 1980s series.

=== Lodar ===
Lodar is the main villain of the minicomic "Slave City" which said minicomic was an adaptation of an episode of the TV series titled "A Tale of Two Cities". The main difference between both versions is the change of villains.

He later got a toy in the Masters of the Univers Classics toyline. Zodac had trapped Lodar and his kobolds beneath the catacombs for years until they were freed by Queen Balina and her wizard Draca. He assisted them in usurping the throne from Queen Balina's sister Princess Rana before being driven back into the catacombs by He-Man.

== Series exclusive villains ==
- Aran and Oona (voiced by Lou Scheimer and Linda Gary) – Aran and Una are two travelers who resemble Native Americans. They request to join Skeletor, hoping to increase their power. He tests them by requiring that they bring him the masks of power from the City of the Ancients. Instead, the pair wear the masks to harness the power for themselves and are transformed into the personas of the evil King Deemos and Queen Terella, the last rulers of the city. Upon being possessed by the masks, they attempt to recover the Sword of the Ancients. The sword declares it was destined to merge with He-Man's Sword of Power, thus thwarting Deemos and Terella. Aran and Una are then freed from the king and queen's control with the merging of the Sword of Ancients.
- Azrog (voiced by Alan Oppenheimer) – An evil wizard from Trolla.
- Chimera (voiced by Alan Oppenheimer) – Count Marzo's monstrous sidekick. He can teleport anywhere and summon Wolf Bats by doing a high-pitched howl.
- Creeping Horak – The Creeping Horak (also referred to as simply the Horak) is an evil black blob that grows inside of a building until all of the air is squeezed out, suffocating its victims. It appears in the episode "The Curse of the Spellstone". In ancient times, the Creeping Horak was the worst punishment. Long ago, the Horak was used to punish criminals. They would be locked in their houses and the Horak would grow over it until all of the air was squeezed out. When Evil-Lyn has the villagers bring it to her in the small, blue box that the Horak is contained in, an elder villager begs her to not use it because it is "too terrible".
- Damon – Damon is an evil wizard who appears in the DC Comics MOTU mini-series. He wants to have the secrets of Castle Grayskull before Skeletor, and tries to manipulate him, but Skeletor confronts and kills him.
- Dragoon (voiced by Alan Oppenheimer) – Dragoon is a fire-breathing dragonoid creature who allies with Skeletor and is sent to threaten Orko's homeworld. He captures many of the Trollans (with the exception of Dree Elle, who travels to Eternia seeking Orko's help) and drains them of their energy. While fighting He-Man, Dragoon falls into the Bottomless Hole of Trolla, but is rescued by He-Man. Dragoon seems surprised that He-Man would save the life of an enemy, but He-Man tells him, "I may be your enemy, but you're not mine". Realizing the error of his ways, Dragoon decides that saving lives is better and thanks He-Man as he walks away. Although does not make a return appearance in the series, his character model was reused for the Dark One in the She-Ra episode "Into the Dark Dimension" with some alterations (namely his colouring and height).
- Darkdream (voiced by Alan Oppenheimer) – Darkdream is a mysterious, ghost-like creature with the power to disturb people's dreams and induce terrifying hallucinations.
- Enchantress (voiced by Linda Gary) – The Enchantress is an evil counterpart to The Sorceress, who for years held Adam's grandfather King Miro as her prisoner.
- Evil Giants – A trio of three giants that appeared in the 2002 series.
  - Azdar (voiced by Richard Newman) – A purple-skinned giant who appeared in the 2002 series. Buzz-Off made enemies with him.
  - Belzar (voiced by Brian Drummond) – A green-skinned giant who appeared in the 2002 series.
  - Chadzar (voiced by Mark Acheson) – A red-skinned giant who appeared in the 2002 series.
- Game Master (voiced by Alan Oppenheimer) – The Game Master is a space-faring gladiator who travels the galaxies recruiting great warriors to fight for amusement in his arena.
  - Game Master's Spy – The Game Master's pet creature that looks like a small anteater with bird-like wings. It served as a spy for the Game Master and sent it to see if He-Man was a worthy opponent for him.
- General Tartaran (voiced by Lou Scheimer) – A goblin from the planet Venatar who is the leader of an army of goblins and an ally of Skeletor.
- Jarvan (voiced by Alan Oppenheimer) – Jarvan is an evil sorcerer from the episode "A Friend in Need" who is previously imprisoned by He-Man, but escapes to wreak havoc once again. He uses a potion containing a powerful drug to achieve his evil aims. Jarvan is later recaptured by He-Man and although he swears revenge, he is sent back to the prison mines never to return.
- King Von (voiced by Lou Scheimer) – The ruler of the cave-dwelling Torgs.
- Kothos (voiced by John Erwin) – Kothos is an evil wizard who travels around Eternia in his floating palace. He is turned into a sand-slug by Evil-Lyn, but later reverts to his human form and returns with a vengeance. In that episode "Revenge is Never Sweet", he turns to good and decides to use his magic to help others after He-Man saves his floating castle form destruction at the hands of a vengeful Evil-Lyn. He did not have a toy made of him.
- Maddok (voiced by John Erwin) – A villain who took control of the animals at the animal sanctuary in order to replace Beast Man in Skeletor's Evil Warriors.
- Monteeg (voiced by Alan Oppenheimer) – A deceptive-looking creature that once helped Skeletor overthrow King Archibald. He abducted different mighty warriors from across space and time to do his bidding.
- Negator (voiced by Alan Oppenheimer) – Negator is a computer whiz hell-bent on attaining great power for himself. He did not have a toy made of him. Not to be confused with Megator.
  - Nerbs – The hooded robed servants of Negator.
- Ollo (voiced by John Erwin) – The head of the Ape Clan that allied with Skeletor at the time when Skeletor traveled to Eternia's past.
- Sh'Gora (voiced by John Erwin) – Sh'Gora is a powerful eons old evil entity, summoned by Skeletor and Evil-Lyn, who immediately lost control of it and were imprisoned in crystal. This caused Whiplash to beg He-Man for his help in deal with Sh'Gora. Sh'Gora proved powerful enough to force entry into Grayskull and subdue the Sorceress. It also absorbs the life force or mystical energies of his victims. It was only defeated when the magics of both the evil and the good (Skeletor + Evil-Lyn + the Sorceress) combined for a common goal, which was the only way to open a gateway back to Sh'Gora's dimension and imprison him there. It did not have a toy made of it.
- Shadowing (voiced by Lou Scheimer) – Shadowing (pronounced as Shadow Wing) is a malevolent and powerful dragon from Darksmoke. He was banished into the Realm of Demons by Granamyr centuries ago, but is freed from his imprisonment by an Eternian wizard named Zem, who wants Shadowing to help him take revenge on He-Man. Shadowing turns Zem into a frog for his arrogance and proceeds to attack Darksmoke, only to be soundly defeated and sent back to the Realm of Demons by Granamyr's vastly superior power.
- Slavemaster (voiced by Alan Oppenheimer) – The Slavemaster is an intergalactic crime boss who travels the universe capturing slaves from across the galaxies.
  - Jawbreaker (voiced by John Erwin) – Slave Master's colossal robot servant.
- Space Pirates – The Space Pirates only appear in one episode in the 1980s series.
  - Captain Sticky Fingers (voiced by John Erwin) – Leader of the Space Pirates.
  - Batty (voiced by Alan Oppenheimer) – pet of Captain Sticky Fingers.
  - Frogman (voiced by Erika Scheimer) – A humanoid frog who is a member of the Space Pirates.
  - Hisser (voiced by Alan Oppenheimer) – A reptilian man who is a member of the Space Pirates.
  - Lavaman (voiced by Lou Scheimer) – A lava man who is a member of the Space Pirates.
  - Leo (voiced by Lou Scheimer) – A humanoid lion who is a member of the Space Pirates.
  - Tracker – A creature that is owned by the Space Pirates who use it to sniff out whoever they are pursuing.
- Spydra (voiced by Linda Gary) – An evil witch with ties to Azrog.
- Tavor (voiced by John Erwin) – An evil wizard who alongside Evil-Lyn worked with Darkdream.
- Toy Maker (voiced by John Erwin) – The Toy Maker is a toymaker who can make dangerous toys. He helps Skeletor until he double-crosses him. He helps He-Man deactivate three of his toys.

== Other characters ==
- Chef Alan (voiced by John Erwin) - The royal chef of Eternos City.

== See also ==
- List of She-Ra: Princess of Power and She-Ra and the Princesses of Power characters
- Reptilian conspiracy theory — Robert E. Howard's 1929 short story "The Shadow Kingdom" from Weird Tales magazine is the origin of both the sword and sorcery subgenre of fantasy fiction and the conspiracy theory concerning a hidden species of advanced reptilian beings disguised among us while covertly controlling the levers of power, which has been a recurring theme in fiction and conspiracy since the story's publication. It was Howard's stories that inspired Masters of the Universe.
