= Masters of the Universe (comics) =

Limited series

Publication information
- Publisher: DC Comics; Marvel Comics; London Edition Magazines; Image Comics; CrossGen
- Schedule: Monthly, biweekly (DC Comics' 2012 digital series)
- Format: Ongoing series
- Genre: Superhero
- Publication date: DC Comics: December 1982 – February 1983; July 2012 – ongoing; Marvel Comics: May 1986 – May 1988; London Edition Magazines: 1986–1990; Image Comics (MV Creations): November 2002 – December 2004; Dark Horse Comics: July 2021 – ongoing
- No. of issues: DC Comics: 3 (1982–1983); 34 (2012–ongoing); Marvel Comics: 14; London Edition Magazines: 103; Image Comics (MV Creations): 26; Dark Horse Comics: 4 (2021)
- Main characters: Masters of the Universe characters

Collected editions
- The Shard of Darkness: ISBN 1-59314-017-7
- Dark Reflections: ISBN 0-97480-081-3

The Masters of the Universe media franchise includes several comic book series. Most were small publications (known as "minicomics"), which were included with action figures. Standalone comic book series were also published by DC, Marvel Comics, London Edition Magazines and Image Comics.

== Publication history ==
=== Original Mattel minicomics (1981) ===
The original action figures were packaged with minicomics, with stories about the characters. Written by Donald F. Glut and illustrated by Alfredo P. Alcala, these first four stories (He-Man and the Power Sword, King of Castle Grayskull, Battle in the Clouds and The Vengeance of Skeletor) in booklet form had one image per page with text underneath.

He-Man is introduced in the first mini comic, He-man and the Power Sword, as a wandering barbarian, leaving behind his jungle tribe on Eternia. The world of Eternia is initially depicted as dealing with the aftermath of a great war that has devastated once-powerful civilizations, leaving behind their fantastical machinery and weapons. The events of the war have also opened a rift between dimensions, which has allowed the evil warlord Skeletor to travel into Eternia. Skeletor sets his sights on obtaining both halves of the Power Sword (originally split in two in these early stories), in order to gain entry into the ancient Castle Grayskull (depicted, in these early comics, as being inhabited by the ghostly "Spirit of Castle Grayskull"). The main premise is that whoever attains control of Castle Grayskull will gain the power to become Master of the Universe.

To combat Skeletor, He-Man is given special powers, armor, and weapons by the Sorceress (she has green skin in her debut appearance and is wearing the "snake armor" that came with the original Teela action figure). He-Man (not yet with the dual identity of Prince Adam) is supported in these initial stories by his heroic allies: Battle Cat (without the dual form of Cringer), Man-At-Arms, Teela, and Stratos, the winged warrior (who erroneously came fighting on the side of Skeletor in the initial mini-comic). Skeletor, in turn, enlists the help of the brutish apelike Beast Man and fishlike Mer-Man to battle He-Man or his heroic warriors.

To distinguish these stories from the minicomics which were released as tie-ins with the TV series, fans called this first version of Eternia "mini-Eternia", "Min-Eternia", or "savage Eternia".

=== DC Comics inserts and limited comics series (1982) ===
In July 1982, He-Man and the Masters of the Universe appeared in DC Comics Presents Issue #47, in the story From Eternia With Death, followed by a special insert comic in many DC titles from November 1982, entitled "Fate is the Killer". In these first two DC MOTU stories, Superman ends up on Eternia, joining with He-Man to combat Skeletor and his minions.

The following month, a Masters of the Universe limited series was published, written by Paul Kupperberg and pencilled by George Tuska, which lasted for three issues. These issues introduce the Eternian Royal Family, most notably Prince Adam (DC Comics Presents #47), and his transformation into He-Man in the series. This version of Adam was depicted wearing a blue vest and portrayed as somewhat of a philanderer, rather than his later more wholesome pink-vest-wearing character. Also unique to these issues, Adam transforms inside the "Cavern of Power". The Sorceress, residing in the Cavern of Power, is depicted wearing the Teela Snake Armor, and is often referred to as "The Goddess" throughout the series. Other entries into the Masters of the Universe mythos, such as Cringer as the alter ego of Battle Cat, Zodac as a neutral cosmic enforcer, Stratos as leader of his home world of Avion, and Adam's mother, Queen Marlena, as an astronaut hailing from Earth, were all partly introduced in these early DC issues.

=== DC Comics minicomics (1982) ===
This second series, consisting of seven new mini-comics and released in 1982–83, was produced by DC Comics, written by Gary Cohn and featured artwork by Mark Texeira. These mini-comics devoted several issues toward introducing the new action figure characters into the line.

Cohn did not continue the same canon set in the first four minicomics. He-Man no longer is a wandering barbarian, but resides at the Royal Palace and is supported by allies such as Man-At-Arms (the Eternian master of weapons) whom DC changed to be the adoptive father to Teela. Skeletor finds one half of the Power Sword, the key to Castle Grayskull. He-Man received the other half from the Sorceress and must prevent Skeletor from linking the two halves and gaining access to the castle. DC Comics introduced many new elements like a King and Queen, the Royal Palace, as well as more scifi-themed villains, such as Trap Jaw, to the stories.

He-Man's new ally Ram Man is initially tricked into fighting on the side of Skeletor in He-Man Meets Ram-Man. Man-E-Faces is introduced in The Ordeal of Man-E-faces as an Eternian actor turned into a monster by Skeletor, freed by the Sorceress, only to be magically possessed by three multiple personalities: man, monster, and robot. Skeletor's evil warriors also get their own introductory mini comics, with Tri-Klops as a skilled swordsman/mercenary in The Terror of Tri-Klops and Trap Jaw portrayed in The Menace of Trap Jaw as a criminal from another dimension.

In these pre-Filmation stories, the characters of Prince Adam, Cringer, Orko, and Evil-Lyn did not yet feature in the series; although the Eternian Palace and Royal Court with King Randor and Queen Marlena (both yet unnamed, looking decidedly older than in the later series) are featured in several of these DC mini-comics, as are the mystical falcon Zoar (not yet an alternate form of the Sorceress) and the Attak-Trak (battle machine, based on the toy, and not yet a robotic-voiced van-like vehicle, as in the Filmation cartoon). The storyline concept of Teela as the secret daughter of the Sorceress (as a clone) and adopted daughter of Man-At-Arms was first introduced at this time in the mini comic The Tale of Teela.

A special comic and record entitled The Power of Point Dread/Danger at Castle Grayskull was produced for the Talon Fighter and Point Dread playset.

=== International comic series (1983–1990) ===
Original comic-book content was also created in Germany by Interpart/Condor Verlag for 18 issues, Ehapa Verlag for 21 issues (also appearing in their Micky Maus comics) and also by Mattel itself. Both the German and British comics were often translated to provide content for other countries. Some comic books from Ledafilms of Argentina and Editora Abril of Brazil, along with Italy's Più and Magic Boy magazines, provided some original material in their pages as well.

=== Later Mattel minicomics (1983–1988) ===
Series three of Mattel's MOTU mini comics contained stories similar to the Filmation animated series, with mini comics such as Dragon's Gift, Masks of Power, and Double-Edge Sword adapting stories straight from the first-season episodes of the same name. There were some differences from Filmation, however, as can be seen in The Temple of Darkness mini comic with the Sorceress, now in her birdlike Filmation attire, but in an all-white version of the costume. The mini comics He-Man and the Insect People and The Clash of Arms included many of the new characters from the toy line such as Buzz-Off, Mekaneck, Fisto, Stridor, Webstor, Clawful, and Whiplash; while others such as The Secret Liquid of Life, Slave City, and The Siege of Avion had less to do with the toy line and introduced new original mini-comic characters instead, such as He-Man's childhood friend Prince Dakon, the evil Geldor, the Kobold master Lodar, and Haramesh the demon.

Series four of the mini comics in 1985 began to depart from some aspects of Filmation's continuity, as each member of the Evil Horde appeared in their own titular mini comic, focusing more on their attempts to attack He-Man and invade Eternia rather than anything She-Ra/Princess of Power–related. Likewise, Skeletor's dragon-blaster and He-Man's thunder-punch powers were never seen in the animated series, but debut here in the mini comics Skeletor's Dragon and The Treachery of Modulok. Roboto also received an alternate origin story in The Battle of Roboto, being a creation of Man-At-Arms rather than a wandering alien, as in the Filmation series. Stinkor and Spikor starred in their own mini comics as well, in The Stench of Evil and Spikor Strikes, which also included Moss Man, Sy-Klone (referred to as "Tornado"), and the Spydor vehicle. Only the mini comic The Obelisk followed the established continuity more closely and did not feature any of the new characters or vehicles. Michael Halperin and Christy Marx wrote many of the 1984 and 1985 mini comics, while Lee Nordling often served as editor. Larry Houston, Michael Lee, and Alfred Alcala composed most of the artwork for these issues, while DC Comics' Bruce Timm was the illustrator for Grizzlor - The Legend Comes Alive!

With the introduction of Hordak, the minicomics began to diverge from the He-Man and She-Ra animated series and Etheria became Hordak's base of operations. Years earlier, Hordak had been overthrown by his minion Skeletor and banished from Eternia. He returns, accompanied by the Evil Horde, to conquer the planet. Occasionally allying with Skeletor (but usually attempting to destroy him), Hordak is opposed by He-Man.

One of the main storylines of the later mini comics, released with these later waves of action figures, was the introduction of a new major villain faction known as the Snake Men. In the mini-comic King of the Snakemen, Skeletor discovers a pool of energy buried in Snake Mountain which contains ancient emperor King Hiss. Hiss discloses that he had conquered a number of planets before invading Eternia. Large portions of the planet had fallen to the Snake Men before they were defeated by the Council of the Elders and banished to another dimension. Hiss now seeks to recover his fellow Snake Men and bring vengeance to Eternia. Kobra Khan, Tung-Lashor, and Rattlor (who previously appeared in the He-Man and She-Ra cartoon series with Skeletor, and/or as members of the Horde), were now under the leadership of the ancient Eternian King Hiss, whose Snake Men army rose from Eternia's past, joining forces with Skeletor to once again rule Eternia (additional Snake Men were later added to the roster in the form of the long-armed Sssqueeze and the medusa-like Snake Face in the mini comic Revenge of the Snake Men).

Another major mini comic storyline of this period included the introduction of the three-towered fortress of Eternia in The Ultimate Battleground, which was a massive final playset, complete with a motorized monorail circling the towers: Grayskull Tower, Viper Tower, and Central Tower. The giant structure is raised from underground by Hiss and Skeletor and is the focus of adventures as He-Man tries to prevent all three villains from acquiring the towers' secrets. Hordak recognises the towers, and claims to have helped build Central Tower. The return of the Towers enhances the Sorceress' magic, and she helps King Randor in his search to discover what happened to his long-lost brother Keldor. Skeletor is determined to stop the search.

Other notable mini comics included the debut of Hordak's gruesome mind-altering Slime Pit in Escape from the Slime Pit, one of several origin stories for Rokkon and Stonedar in Rock People to the Rescue, cybernetic Horde experiments resulting in the creation of the warriors Dragstor and Extendar in The Warrior Machine, and the suggested origin of Skeletor as Keldor in The Search for Keldor (which also included the only mini comic appearances for He-Man's ally Clamp Champ, and Skeletor's minions Ninjor, Scare Glow, and Faker). All of this was leading toward what would have been a continuation of the series in "The Powers of Grayskull" line, before being discontinued. These series five and six mini comics were often edited by Lee Nordling with art direction from Ron Cook, and included writing by Tim Kiplin, Phil White, and Steven Grant, with the artwork of Bruce Timm, Jim Mitchell, Chris Carlson, Charles Simpson, and Larry Houston, among others.

=== Princess of Power minicomics (1984–1986) ===
Included with the She-Ra dolls beginning in 1985, these differed from the cartoon series. She-Ra lives in the Crystal Castle, and Catra (rather than Hordak) is the primary villain.

=== Marvel Star Comics series (1986–1988) ===
Marvel's Star Comics imprint published 13 issues in 1986–88 and an adaptation of the live-action movie in 1987. Among the creators were Mike Carlin and Ron Wilson. Within the Marvel Multiverse, it is designated as Earth-86051.

=== UK magazines (1986–1991) ===
First published in the UK by London Editions Magazines, the fortnightly comic series lasted for 72 issues between 1986 and 1988, with an additional comic (Masters of the Universe Adventure) running for 28 issues between 1988 and 1991.

Egmont's London Editions in the United Kingdom, published 72 issues biweekly of their By The Power Of Grayskull...Masters Of The Universe comic magazine from 1986 to 1988. The series was headed by Brian Clarke, and is often noted for in-depth stories expanding the canon and the origins of many Masters of the Universe characters. Storylines included the battle for control of Viper Tower, a team-up of the three villainous factions and the destruction and rebuilding of Eternos. The 'Secret Files of Scrollos' strip featured origin stories for many characters including Sy-Klone, Rio Blast and Modulok, and the series included the characters of Horde Prime and Scrollos, who served as an in-universe editor and guide to the series. From issue 50 onward, the series would begin to reprint many translated and reworked versions of Ehapa's German Language comics, although original content was still produced for "the Secret Files of Scrollos" portion of the comic magazine until its demise in late 1988. Fourteen issues of For the Honor of Grayskull She-Ra were also produced by London Editions from 1986 to 1987, as were several one-shot special issues, which included a dual He-Man and She-Ra feature-length adventure in Twins of Power.

Starting in 1987, London Editions added a second larger monthly comic magazine entitled Masters of the Universe Adventure, which ran for 18 issues before turning into a New Adventures themed magazine He-Man Adventure for six more issues, before ending the series with four final issues in a best-of format of reprints in 1991. The later issues of both the fortnightly MOTU comic and the Adventure Magazine reprinted stories from the German MOTU comics published by Ehapa, translated into English. In September 1989 the comic was renamed 'He-Man Adventure' and was now based on 'The New Adventures' toy line, again reprinting stories from the German Ehapa comics until the comic was discontinued in 1991.

=== Newspaper comic strip (1986–1991) ===
A newspaper comic strip, He-Man and the Masters of the Universe, was produced from July 20, 1986 until 1991, written by James Shull and Chris Weber and distributed by McNaught Syndicate. While most American newspapers dropped the strip mid-run, it was translated and distributed around the world.

Fifteen storylines were presented over the course of the run. The complete run (minus a small number of "lost strips") was published in 2017 by Dark Horse Comics as He-Man and the Masters of the Universe: The Newspaper Comic Strips.

=== He-Man minicomics (1989) ===
Four minicomics were included with the 1989 space-themed relaunch. The story was similar to the UK magazine version of He-Man's New Adventures, differing from the cartoon series.

=== 2000s MVC and Image Comics series (2002–2005) ===
From 2002 to 2005 Image Comics and MVCreations published several series of comics and one-shots that mirrored tales of the 2002 Mike Young Productions show; the comic series elaborated and added to the mythos by introducing characters that never made it in after the 39 episodes of the television series. The first issues were seen in the summer of 2002 in the form of special promotional/preview issues, with three mini-series continuing on after; 'The Shards of Darkness' in fall 2002, followed by 'Dark Reflections' and 'Rise of the Snake Men' in 2003. After delving into the back-stories of Skeletor's henchmen Beast-Man, Mer-Man, Trap-Jaw and Tri-Klops in a four issue 'Icons of Evil' series, a short-lived ongoing series, solely produced by MVC, continued on for eight issues in 2004. Along with these, a handful of special or 'pack-in' one-shots and trade paperback collected volumes were also produced.

=== Dark Horse / DC minicomics (2011-2015) ===
Dark Horse Comics produced the first three minicomics for inclusion in Mattel's Masters of the Universe Classics toy line, continuing the series of minicomics introduced in the 1980s Masters toys. The minicomics were written by Tim Seeley and drawn by Wellinton Alves, with covers by Eric Powell. According to Seeley, these minicomics would conclude the story originally planned to be the new direction of the 1980s action-figure line before it was cancelled. The Dark Horse mini comics create a new story set in the "Classics" timeline, but base the first issue on "The Powers of Grayskull" minicomic from the 80s, re-telling it to some degree, before venturing into the new Classics stories not related to original vintage concept. In these issues, He-Man goes back in time to battle King Hiss, finally bringing He-Ro, Eldor, Tytus, and Megator into the storylines and introducing newly created Classics characters such as Sir Laser-Lot and the Mighty Spector. Seeley stated that these comics were intended to blend the different He-Man continuities and select the best stories and ideas from MOTU history. The story dealt with the Powers of Grayskull line, which included King Hiss and He-Ro, tying the toy continuity to the He-Man line and known as The New Adventures of He-Man. Seeley said that this comic line was intended to blend the He-Man continuities and select the best stories and ideas from MOTU history.

DC took over the Masters of the Universe Classics minicomics in 2012, with stories from Scott Neitlich and artwork by Wellinton Alves and Axel Gimenez. Five more minicomics were published to be included with the MOTU Classics line action figures; the first told the origin story of Keldor (Skeletor), the second dealt with He-Man and Skeletor's final battle after the events of the intergalactic New Adventures. The third begins ushering in the Son of He-Man era (introduced as a new series concept by Lou Scheimer in the 1990s, but never produced); which then continues for two more issues, culminating in the Third Ultimate Battleground. The Fall of Eternia saga in the final issues incorporates the proposed Dare, son of He-Man (He-Ro II) series from the 1990s, along with Gorpo (the Unnamed One) and many "Create-a-character" contest finalist designs from the 1980s Masters of the Universe Magazine.

Many of these stories are meant to be read in conjunction with the altered continuity presented in the character biographies on the cardbacks of the Masters of the Universes Classic's line action figure packaging, and thus do not provide a detailed flowing narrative in the mini comics themselves. The 8th and final mini comic of this series was published in 2015.

=== DC Comics (2012–2020) ===
A Masters of the Universe comic book series was relaunched by DC Comics in June 2012, first appearing as a series of digital comics. This was quickly followed by a six issue mini-series and all new revised origin issues for He-Man, Skeletor and Hordak. After a crossover mini-series with superheroes from the DC Comics universe in 2013, an ongoing series ran for 19 issues through 2014.

The He-Man The Eternity War 15-issue series in 2015–2016 introduced a new back-story for He-man's sister She-Ra (as Despara), Skeletor (as the half-Garn son of King Miro), Hordak, and the Snakemen, and moved the storyline further along, with a new Horde invasion of Eternia and He-Man taking the Eternian throne, amongst other new developments.

He-Man/ThunderCats, a crossover with another heroic 1980's action figure line, ThunderCats, was also produced for 6 issues in 2016–2017. DC also produces a six-part crossover series with DC Comics' Injustice Storyline. The last comic book series from this run by DC Comics was He-Man and the Masters of the Multiverse six-issue limited series released from 2019 to 2020.

The final DC Comics MOTU run was 'He-Man and the Masters of the Multiverse', which began in November 2019, with a six issue limited series, written by Tim Seeley. This used elements from various sources in MOTU lore, vintage minicomics, '87 movie, filmation, 2002 series as well as references to "Eternity War" story arc.

=== Dark Horse Comics (2021–present) ===
On July 7, 2021, Dark Horse Comics released the first issue of the four issue miniseries that serves as a prequel to the animated series Masters of the Universe: Revelation released by Netflix.

== List of Publications ==
- The Art of He-Man and the Masters of the Universe (2015-04-29)
- The Art of He-Man and the Masters of the Universe (2023-01-11)
- The Art of Masters of the Universe Revelation (2022-05-04)

He-Man and the Masters of the Universe: Art Book

- The Toys of He-Man and the Masters of the Universe
  - The Toys of He-Man and the Masters of the Universe part 1 (2022-05-04)
  - The Toys of He-Man and the Masters of the Universe part 2 (2022-05-04)
- He-Man and the Masters of the Universe: A Character Guide and World Compendium
- Volume one (2017-05-24)
- Volume two (2017-05-24)
- He-Man and the Masters of the Universe: The Newspaper Comic Strips (2017-05-24)
- He-Man and She-Ra: Complete Guide to the Classic Animated Adventures (2016-09-14)
- Action figure minicomics: Includes 68 releases from 1980s Masters of the Universe line, 1980s Princess of Power line, 1980s-1990s He-Man line, 2010s? Masters of the Universe Classics line, comic creators interview.
  - He-Man and the Masters of the Universe Minicomic Collection Volume 1 (2015-11-04)
  - He-Man and the Masters of the Universe Minicomic Collection Volume 2 (2015-11-04)
- Masters of the Universe: Revelation: Prequel to the Netflix television series
  - No. 1 (2021-07-07): Beginning of He-Man's journey
  - No. 2 (2021-08-11)
  - No. 3 (2021-09-08): Origin of Evil-Lyn
  - No. 4 (2021-10-20): He-Man confronts Skeletor about the destructive Orlax monster.
  - Masters of the Universe: Revelation (2022-02-23): Includes Masters of the Universe: Revelation No. 1-No. 4.
- Masters of the Universe: Masterverse
  - No. 1 (2023-02-15)
  - No. 2 (2023-03-15)
  - No. 3 (2023-04-12)
  - No. 4 (2023-05-17)
- Masters of the Universe: Forge of Destiny
  - No. 1 (2023-09-06)
  - No. 2 (2023-10-04)
  - No. 3 (2023-11-01)
  - No. 4 (2023-12-06)
- Masters of the Universe: Revolution: Prequel to the Netflix television series

== List of minicomics ==
The following is a list of the mini-comics released with the Masters of the Universe, Princess of Power, He-Man, and Masters of the Universe Classics toys.

=== Original minicomics ===
- He-Man and the Power Sword (1981)
- King of Castle Grayskull (1981)
- Battle in the Clouds (1981)
- The Vengeance of Skeletor (1981)

=== Second series minicomics ===
- He-Man Meets Ram-Man (1982)
- The Ordeal of Man-E-Faces (1982)
- The Terror of Tri-Klops (1982)
- The Menace of Trap Jaw (1982)
- The Tale of Teela (1982)
- The Magic Stealer! (1982)
- The Power of...Point Dread! (1982)

=== Third (Filmation MOTU) series minicomics ===
- Dragon's Gift (1983) (based on the TV episode "The Dragon's Gift")
- Masks of Power (1983) (based on the TV episode "Masks of Power")
- The Secret Liquid of Life (1983) (based on the TV episode "Valley of Power")
- He-Man and the Insect People (1983)
- Double-Edged Sword (1983) (based on the TV episode "Double Edged Sword")
- The Temple of Darkness! (1983) (based on the TV episode "Temple of The Sun")
- Slave City (1983) (based on the TV episode "A Tale of Two Cities")
- The Siege of Avion (1983) (based on the TV episodes "Reign of the Monster" and "Betrayal of Stratos")
- The Clash of Arms (1983)

=== Fourth series minicomics ===
- The Obelisk (1984)
- Skeletor's Dragon (1984)
- The Battle of Roboto (1984)
- Spikor Strikes (1984)
- The Stench of Evil! (1984)
- Grizzlor – The Legend Comes Alive! (1984)
- Leech: The Master of Power Suction Unleashed! (1984)
- Mantenna and the Menace of the Evil Horde! (1984)
- Hordak: The Ruthless Leader's Revenge! (1984)
- The Treachery of Modulok (1984)

=== Fifth series minicomics ===
- The Flying Fists of Power! (1985)
- Rock People to the Rescue! (1985)
- King of the Snake Men (1985)
- The Terror Claws Strike! (1985)
- Escape from the Slime Pit! (1985)
- The Menace of Multi-Bot! (1985)
- The Warrior Machine! (1985)
- Eye of the Storm (1985)
- The Fastest Draw in the Universe (1985)
- The Hordes of Hordak (1985)
- Between a Rock and a Hard Place! (1985)
- Snake Attack! (1985)
- The Ultimate Battleground! (1986)

=== Sixth series minicomics ===
- The Search for Keldor (1986)
- Enter...Buzz-Saw Hordak! (1986)
- Revenge of the Snake Men! (1986)
- Energy Zoids (1986)
- The Powers of Grayskull – The Legend Begins! (1986)
- The Cosmic Key (1987)

=== Princess of Power minicomics ===
- The Story of She-Ra (1984)
- Journey to Mizar (1984)
- The Hidden Symbols Mystery (1984)
- Disappearing Treasures (1984)
- Adventure of the Blue Diamond (1984)
- Across the Crystal Light Barrier (1985)
- A Fishy Business! (1985)
- A Most Unpleasant Present (1985)
- A Born Champion (1985)
- Fantastic Fashions (1985)
- Don't Rain on my Parade! (1986)
- Where Hope Has Gone (1986)

=== He-Man (New Adventures) minicomics ===
- The New Adventure (1989)
- Skeletor's Journey (1989)
- Battle For The Crystal (1989)
- The Revenge of Skeletor! (1989)

=== MOTU Classics series minicomics ===
- The Powers of Grayskull Part One: The Legend Begins! (2011)
- The Powers of Grayskull Part Two: He-Ro Unleashed! (2012)
- The Powers of Grayskull Part Three: Battle for the Fate of the Universe! (2012)
- The Secret Origin of Skeletor! (2013)
- He-Man vs Skeletor – Their Final Battle! (2014)
- The Fall of Eternia Part One – Homecoming! (2015)
- The Fall of Eternia Part Two – Together Again For The First Time! (2015)
- The Fall of Eternia Part Three – The Third Ultimate Battleground (2015)

== Collected editions ==
Many of the comic books were collected into trade paperbacks:

=== Dark Horse collected editions ===
The minicomics books have been collected into a hardcover anthology collection by Dark Horse Books:

- He-Man and the Masters of the Universe Minicomic Collection (collects all of the original Masters of the Universe, Princess of Power, He-Man, and the first three Masters of the Universe Classics minicomics; all of which originally came with the action figures, 1232 pages, Dark Horse Comics, October 2015)

The complete run of the newspaper comic strip produced from July 20, 1986 until 1991 (minus a small number of "lost strips") was published in 2017 by Dark Horse Comics:

- He-Man and the Masters of the Universe: The Newspaper Comic Strips (collects complete run 1986–1991, Dark Horse Comics, 2017, ISBN 978-1506700731)

=== MVCreations collected editions ===
- Volume 1: The Shard of Darkness (collects Masters of the Universe (2002) #1-4, 112 pages, MVCreations, November 2005, ISBN 1-59314-017-7)
- Volume 2: Dark Reflections (collects Masters of the Universe (2003) #1-6, 112 pages, MVCreations, June 2004, ISBN 0-9748008-1-3)
- Masters of the Universe: Icons of Evil (collects Tri-Klops, Trapjaw, Mer-Man and Beastman one-shots, 176 pages, April 2004, MVCreations, ISBN 0-9748008-0-5)

=== DC collected editions ===
DC has collected editions of their various current Masters of the Universe comic series, which began in 2012.
