= Masters of the Universe (TV series) =

American animated television series

- Revelation Part 1 promotional poster
- Also known as: Masters of the Universe: Revelation (season 1; two parts); Masters of the Universe: Revolution (season 2)
- Genre: Action-adventure; Science fantasy; Sword and sorcery; Superhero
- Based on: Masters of the Universe by Mattel
- Showrunner: Kevin Smith
- Directed by: Adam Conarroe; Patrick Stannard
- Starring: Chris Wood; Mark Hamill; Sarah Michelle Gellar; Liam Cunningham; Lena Headey; Melissa Benoist; William Shatner; Meg Foster; Keith David
- Music by: Bear McCreary
- Country of origin: United States
- Original language: English
- No. of seasons: 2 (3 parts)
- No. of episodes: 15

Production
- Executive producers: Kevin Smith; Ted Biaselli; Adam Bonnett; Rob David; Christopher Keenan; Frederic Soulie
- Producer: Susan Corbin
- Editors: David Howe; Lauren Aptekar
- Running time: 22–32 minutes
- Production companies: Powerhouse Animation Studios; Mattel Television

Original release
- Network: Netflix
- Release: July 23, 2021 – January 25, 2024

Related
- He-Man and the Masters of the Universe

Masters of the Universe is an American animated superhero fantasy television series from showrunner Kevin Smith, and produced by Mattel Television and Powerhouse Animation Studios, with animation services provided by DR Movie. A sequel to the 1983–1985 series He-Man and the Masters of the Universe by Filmation—while ignoring the events of She-Ra: Princess of Power (1985–1987), and The New Adventures of He-Man (1990)—the plot of the series explores unresolved storylines from the original series. It stars the voices of Chris Wood, Mark Hamill, Sarah Michelle Gellar, Liam Cunningham, Lena Headey, Melissa Benoist, William Shatner, Meg Foster and Keith David, and follows a terrible battle between He-Man and Skeletor that left Eternia divided, and the Guardians of Grayskull split up. Now, many decades later, Teela needs to reunite this group of heroes and decipher the mysterious disappearance of the Sword of Power.

Netflix released the first series, Masters of the Universe: Revelation, in two parts, with five episodes debuting July 23, 2021, then five additional episodes on November 23, 2021. In June 2022, Netflix announced a second series, Masters of the Universe: Revolution (the third and final part overall), which premiered on January 25, 2024. The series received generally positive reviews from critics.

== Premise ==
=== Revelation ===
Skeletor's final assault on Castle Grayskull caused his demise, put an end to He-Man, and damaged the source of all magic in existence. After their battle fractured Eternia, Teela must solve the mystery of the missing Sword of Power to prevent the end of the Universe. Her journey will uncover the secrets of Grayskull at last.

=== Revolution ===
Following He-Man's return and Teela now assuming the mantle of the Sorceress of Castle Grayskull, Skeletor seeks revenge after being corrupted with a technological virus created by his master, Hordak. With his newfound power, Skeletor resumes his revenge on Eternia under the guise of his previous identity Keldor. Meanwhile Teela emphasizes her duties as the Sorceress by bringing the overworld afterlife of Preternia back after its evisceration by Evil-Lyn.

== Voice cast ==
- Chris Wood as Prince Adam / He-Man
- Mark Hamill as Skeletor / Skeletek
- Liam Cunningham as Duncan / Man-At-Arms / Man-Of-War
- Sarah Michelle Gellar as Teela (in Revelation)
  - Melissa Benoist as Teela (Revolution)
- Lena Headey as Evil-Lyn "Lyn" / Majestra
- Diedrich Bader as King Randor, Trap Jaw, Buzz Off
- Alicia Silverstone as Queen Marlena (in Revelation)
  - Gates McFadden as Queen Marlena (in Revolution)
- Stephen Root as Cringer / Battle Cat, Snout Spout
- Griffin Newman as Orko, Tuvar
- Susan Eisenberg as Sorceress of Castle Grayskull
- Kevin Michael Richardson as Beast Man
- Kevin Conroy as Mer-Man (in Revelation)
- Henry Rollins as Tri-Klops
- Jason Mewes as Stinkor, Baddrah
- Alan Oppenheimer as Moss Man
- Justin Long as Roboto
- Tony Todd as Scare-Glow
- Phil LaMarr as He-Ro, Spikor, Mendor
- Cree Summer as Priestess, Kuduk
- Tiffany Smith as Andra
- Dennis Haysbert as King Grayskull
- Adam Gifford as Vikor
- Jay Tavare as Wun-Dar
- Method Man as Clamp-Champ
- Ralph Garman as Fisto, Rio Blast
- Danny Trejo as Ram-Man
- Kevin Smith as Goatman, Pigboy
- Dee Bradley Baker as Savage He-Man, Baby Teela
- Meg Foster as Motherboard
- Keith David as Hordak
- John de Lancie as Granamyr
- Ted Biaselli as Gwildor
- William Shatner as Keldor
- Tim Sheridan as King Miro
- Harley Quinn Smith as Queen Amelia
- Brett Rash as Prince Keldor
- Jakari Fraser as Prince Randor
- Cam Clarke as Stonedar
- Jeffrey Combs as Zodac
- Grey DeLisle as Despara

== Episodes ==
Season	Episodes		Originally released
Revelation	10	5	July 23, 2021
Revelation	10	5	November 23, 2021
Revolution	5		January 25, 2024

=== Revelation (2021) ===
No. overall	No. in part	Title	Directed by	Written by	Original release date
Part 1
1	1	"The Power of Grayskull"	Adam Conarroe; Patrick Stannard	Kevin Smith	July 23, 2021
While Teela is being celebrated at a ceremony for taking up the mantle of Man-At-Arms, Skeletor and Evil-Lyn lead an all-out invasion against Castle Grayskull, interrupting the ceremony and attracting the attention of He-Man, Man-At-Arms, and the rest of Eternia. While Eternia's forces confront the army of Snake Mountain outside Castle Grayskull, Teela battles Evil-Lyn inside while He-Man confronts Skeletor at the heart of the castle, where all magic flows through Eternia in a mystical orb enclosed by a locking mechanism built by the Elders. Declaring this to be their final battle, Skeletor incinerates He-Man's ally Moss Man, causing an enraged He-Man to impale Skeletor upon the locking mechanism, exposing Castle Grayskull into its true form as the Hall of Wisdom. Seeking to obtain Eternia's magic for himself, Skeletor cracks the orb and causes an explosion, threatening all reality. The Sorceress manages to slow down time, allowing He-Man to contain the explosion using the Sword of Power as a conduit, splitting it into two and seemingly killing both him and Skeletor. Both Teela and King Randor learn of He-Man's death and true identity as Prince Adam, resulting in Randor banishing Man-At-Arms and Teela deciding to leave the Royal Guard and Grayskull behind, hurt at her friends' betrayal and keeping He-Man's identity from her.
2	2	"The Poisoned Chalice"	Adam Conarroe; Patrick Stannard	Diya Mishra	July 23, 2021
Having become a mercenary after leaving the Royal Guard, Teela retrieves the Glove of Globolah from Stinkor alongside her new mercenary-partner Lieutenant Andra. After returning the Glove to its rightful owners at a church, Teela and Andra are hired by an old woman to retrieve a goblet from Snake Mountain, which they discover has been taken over by Tri-Klops; who has since established a cult that worships technology through the Master Motherboard rather than magic, which he blames for ruining Skeletor's bid for power. Teela and Andra escape Snake Mountain with the goblet, return it to the old woman, and follow her to the Hall of Wisdom. The old woman reveals herself to be Evil-Lyn in disguise, and that the goblet is the disguised head of Skeletor's Havoc Staff, which contains one of the last embers of true magic in Eternia. Evil-Lyn presents the head to the Sorceress, who transfers the remainder of Eternia's magic into Evil-Lyn's staff, becoming greatly weakened in the process. Claiming that Eternia is dying without magic, the Sorceress asks Teela to help restore it by retrieving the two halves of the Sword of Power, which are currently located in the realms they were forged in: the Hall of Heroes in Preternia, and Subternia, the Land of the Dead. Having become disillusioned by the lies of her former friends, Teela initially refuses but is convinced by Cringer to reconsider. To reforge the two halves into one, Teela declares that they must first find Man-At-Arms.
3	3	"The Most Dangerous Man in Eternia"	Adam Conarroe; Patrick Stannard	Marc Bernardin	July 23, 2021
Traveling to find Man-At-Arms, Teela arrives at a village with Andra and Evil-Lyn, which is being attacked by Tri-Klops's technologically enhanced forces. They are fended off by an exiled Man-At-Arms and Beast Man. Man-At-Arms takes the others back to his home, revealing that he has been collecting magic water in order to preserve the life of Orko, who has been dying since Eternia's magic was lost. Man-At-Arms refuses to join their quest, but Orko and Roboto offer their help. Man-At-Arms reconsiders, although Teela decides to send him to Castle Grayskull to defend the Sorceress instead since Roboto can reforge the Sword. Traveling across the Crystal Sea to a gateway to Subternia, the heroes are attacked by Mer-Man and his Aquatican forces, angered at being forgotten by Evil-Lyn after Skeletor's death. With unexpected help from Man-At-Arms, the heroes defeat Mer-Man and force him to guide them to the Subternia gateway, which is activated by the remaining head of the Havoc Staff. Reconciling with Man-At-Arms, Teela and her allies journey downwards into the Land of the Dead.
4	4	"Land of the Dead"	Adam Conarroe; Patrick Stannard	Tim Sheridan	July 23, 2021
Upon entering Subternia, the heroes find themselves separated by various illusions. Roboto, Beast Man and Andra face off against a gang of Shadow Beasts; Evil-Lyn and Orko are taken to Orko's home, Trolla; and Teela is isolated by Scare Glow, who has taken over Subternia. Scare Glow demands the remainder of Teela's fear to feast upon in exchange for his portion of the Sword of Power. Meanwhile, Evil-Lyn and Orko discover that the Font of Mystical Energy, the life force of all Trollans, has dried up, making Orko the last Trollan left. Deceased spirits of the Trollans arrive and merge to form a monster to combat Evil-Lyn and Orko, while Roboto and Andra destroy the Shadow Beasts, and Teela faces off against nightmare versions of He-Man and herself. Teela conquers her fear of her own power and destroys all the illusions, and the team is reunited. Evil-Lyn uses half of the Sword of Power to open a gate to Preternia but is chased after by Scare Glow. Orko remains behind and sacrifices himself to hold Scare Glow off, while the rest of the heroes escape. Upon arrival in Preternia, Teela is greeted by a surprised Prince Adam.
5	5	"The Forge at the Forest of Forever"	Adam Conarroe; Patrick Stannard	Eric Carrasco	July 23, 2021
Having died during the final battle with Skeletor, Prince Adam ended up in the Hall of Heroes in Preternia, where the heroes mourn Orko's death. Retrieving the second half of the Sword of Power from He-Ro, Teela and Adam seek out King Grayskull, while their allies use Roboto's energy at the Forge to restore the Sword of Power. Adam consults with Moss Man after being given the chance to return to Eternia with Teela, conflicted about whether or not to leave the paradise of Preternia. With the Sword of Power restored at the cost of Roboto's life, Teela and her comrades return home with Adam to the Hall of Wisdom. As magic is being restored to Eternia, Adam is suddenly stabbed from behind by a restored Skeletor, who had been biding his time and hiding within Evil-Lyn until the right moment. Claiming the Sword of Power as his own, Skeletor summons the power of Grayskull to ascend as a god and a true master of the universe.
Part 2
6	1	"Cleaved in Twain"	Adam Conarroe; Patrick Stannard	Eric Carrasco; Kevin Smith	November 23, 2021
In a flashback, Teela's mother gives her a magical marking before leaving her daughter and Man-At-Arms to assume her role as The Sorceress. In the present, Skeletor gloats over his enemies, but the Sorceress manages to teleport Adam, Cringer, Teela, and Andra to safety using her remaining magic. Skeletor kills the Sorceress, transforms Evil-Lyn into her replacement, and imprisons Man-At-Arms. Arriving at the Royal Palace, Teela finds herself able to heal Adam's wounds by tapping into her natural magic, before meeting Fisto and Clamp Champ, who have evacuated King Randor, Queen Marlena, and most of Eternos. Tracking the heroes down, Skeletor unleashes his magic to turn the remaining citizens into skeletal minions. Fisto and Clamp Champ are infected, forcing the heroes to destroy them. Skeletor then appears, showcasing his new power by banishing their souls to Subternia. As Skeletor prepares to kill him, Adam reveals that the Sword of Power is only a conduit for his true power, and calls upon his transformation to become Savage He-Man, the first and original He-Man.
7	2	"Reason and Blood"	Adam Conarroe; Patrick Stannard	Tim Sheridan	November 23, 2021
Savage He-Man battles with Skeletor and his minions, but is overwhelmed by Skeletor's superior magic. Teela copies the Sorceress' teleportation spell to bring her friends to safety, arriving in the Mystic Mountains. Skeletor becomes abusive towards Evil-Lyn and interrogates the imprisoned Man-At-Arms, obsessing over the source of Adam's transformation. Teela, Andra, and Cringer lose He-Man only to learn that he is being drawn to Randor's camp in the mountains. He-Man attacks the Royal Guards, directing his rage towards his father. Realizing his son is alive, Randor apologizes for his past mistreatment and declares his pride in his son, allowing He-Man to calm down and transform back. Beast Man confronts Evil-Lyn in private, insisting that her power outmatches Skeletor's and that she should take control.
8	3	"The Gutter Rat"	Adam Conarroe; Patrick Stannard	Diya Mishra	November 23, 2021
Randor reunites with Adam, Cringer, and Teela, and enlists Andra as a lieutenant in the Royal Guard. Adam spends time with Marlena and learns that she and Randor have split up since his death. Evil-Lyn receives pity from Man-At-Arms and begins to doubt her relationship with Skeletor, who grants her a vision of the entire universe. Skeletor unveils his plan to use the upcoming Celestial Apex—the alignment of all the planets in the universe—to increase his own power and destroy He-Man, while Evil-Lyn grows nihilistic, believing that nothing in the universe has a purpose. Beast Man comforts Evil-Lyn, who reveals that she is indebted to Skeletor for rescuing her in the past and granting her purpose, but now realizes she must free everyone from him. Meeting with Adam, Teela reveals her knowledge that the Sorceress is her mother. Evil-Lyn tricks Skeletor into reverting to his normal form, and takes the Sword of Power for herself, becoming Dark-Lyn. Dark-Lyn announces her intention to end all suffering by destroying the universe, eradicating Preternia as an example. The Royal Family begins planning to defeat Dark-Lyn by having Teela become the new Sorceress and is unexpectedly joined by Skeletor.
9	4	"Hope, for a Destination"	Adam Conarroe; Patrick Stannard	Tim Sheridan	November 23, 2021
As Teela attempts to use her magic to send a telepathic message to the people of Eternia, Adam and Skeletor plot to confront Dark-Lyn. Dark-Lyn begins examining the universe, witnessing the death of the god Zoar at the beginning of time, further propelling her nihilism. Adam and Skeletor arrive at Grayskull, battling Dark-Lyn as a distraction while Andra and Teela sneak into the castle's sewers, coming across Spikor, Webstor, Clawful, Blade, Goatman, and Pigboy. Man-At-Arms arrives to help them defeat the villains and encourages Teela to become the new Sorceress. Outside Grayskull, Randor and Marlena reconcile and witness the people of Eternia arriving in response to Teela's message. At the Tide of Transformation below Grayskull, Teela meets the Sorceress' spirit, learning that she must be prepared to let go of her former life to be transformed. Dark-Lyn defeats Adam and Skeletor, killing Panthor and transforming Beast Man in the process, before lambasting Skeletor for his behavior towards her. As she prepares for the destruction of the universe, Dark-Lyn witnesses Eternia's forces approaching and summons Scare Glow and his Subternia army.
10	5	"Comes with Everything You See Here"	Adam Conarroe; Patrick Stannard	Eric Carrasco	November 23, 2021
While Eternia's forces battle against Scare Glow's army, Teela enters the Tide of Transformation, reconciling with her mother and becoming the new Sorceress without severing her connections with her friends and family. Orko is revived as a result of Dark-Lyn raising the dead and uses his enhanced magic to defeat Scare Glow and free the Sword of Power from Dark-Lyn. Adam becomes He-Man once more, battling Dark-Lyn and Beast Man alongside a transformed Skeletor and Battle Cat. Dark-Lyn obtains the power of the Celestial Apex, but is confronted by Teela. Believing they are fated to lose, Skeletor attempts to kill He-Man before the universe is destroyed. As they battle, Teela takes Dark-Lyn to the location of Zoar's death revealing that Zoar had been reborn and that the universe is more than she believed it to be. Dark-Lyn relinquishes her powers and He-Man defeats Skeletor by flinging him into the distance. Together, He-Man and Teela banish Scare Glow's army back to Subternia. Orko begins to return to the afterlife as well, but is stopped by Evil-Lyn. Sometime later, Andra becomes the new Man-At-Arms while Adam and Teela confer that they will always need each other. Evil-Lyn travels to Trolla and abandons her magic staff there. On Snake Mountain, Skeletor rages at Tri-Klops and his cultists for abandoning him and attempts to destroy their Motherboard. However, the Motherboard instead comes to life and begins assimilating Skeletor, revealing itself to bear a Horde insignia.

=== Revolution (2024) ===
No. overall	No. in part	Title	Directed by	Written by	Original release date
11	1	"Even for Kings"	Adam Conarroe; Patrick Stannard	Kevin Smith	January 25, 2024
Motherboard continues to assimilate Skeletor's former minions, revealing that she is working for Hordak to convert Eternia to a new colony for the Horde. He-Man and Orko travel to Subternia to ask Scare Glow to relinquish his hold on Fisto and Clamp Champ's souls. When Scare Glow violently refuses, Teela, the Heroic Warriors, and the Royal Guard of Eternos storm Scare Glow's domain and recover the lost souls. While participating in the action, King Randor is struck down by a fatal illness he's been carrying. Lying on his deathbed and refusing to be healed, Randor encourages Adam to tell Teela about his true feelings for her. At Castle Grayskull, Teela attempts to restore Preternia to ensure the passing of Randor's soul to its proper rest. When she fails, her mother's spirit, bound to Grayskull after Preternia's destruction, advises her that the power of Eternia's three primal gods - Zoar, Ka, and Havoc - are needed to make it work and sends her to Darksmoke where the Staff of Ka is hidden. After Randor dies, Adam's emotional eulogy is suddenly interrupted by a challenge from Randor's long-lost half-brother Keldor.
12	2	"Ascension"	Adam Conarroe; Patrick Stannard	Tim Sheridan	January 25, 2024
In private, Keldor tells Adam of his heritage as King Miro's illegitimate half-Gar son, how he was banished to his people's home in Anwat Gar, and how he was believed dead after an invasion by the Horde. When Skeletor attacks Eterno's populace with nanite weaponry, Adam and Keldor join forces, but Skeletor resurrects one of the Techno Titans, relics of Eternia's former technological past, to wreak havoc. Going after Skeletor, He-Man discovers that the power of Grayskull channeled through his sword, can cure the nanite infection while Keldor directs the other defenders into defeating the titan. Feeling unworthy of the crown, Adam entrusts rulership to Keldor while he tries to find a way to expand his sword's power to eradicate Motherboard's technovirus all over Eternia. It is later revealed that Keldor is really Skeletor in disguise. In Darksmoke, Teela meets Granamyr. To her surprise, Evil-Lyn has taken responsibility for Granamyr after her meddling with the power cosmic has made him terminally ill. Bitter about humanity's lust for power, Granamyr refuses to help Teela, but Evil-Lyn succeeds in changing his mind. Teela receives the Staff of Ka which bestows her with green skin and snake-themed armor.
13	3	"More Things in Heaven and Eternia"	Adam Conarroe; Patrick Stannard	Diya Mishra	January 25, 2024
While reporting to Hordak about the success of his deception, Skeletor is surprised to learn that Keldor really existed. A subsequent mistreatment by Motherboard causes Skeletor to remember that he was actually Keldor until he was captured by the Horde, became Hordak's disciple, was corrupted into his present form by the Havoc Staff, and how Hordak abandoned him after kidnapping one of Randor and Marlena's children. While Evil-Lyn trains Teela in the use of the Staff of Ka's power, they begin opening up about their respective feelings for Skeletor and He-Man. Duncan and Orko take He-Man's sword to the Thenurian locksmith Gwildor to enhance its power. Upon Keldor/Skeletor's suggestion, He-Man and Battle Cat head for Snake Mountain to battle Skeletor, leaving Andra, who longs for more action, dissatisfied and thus susceptible to Skeletor's idea of "inoculating and enhancing" the populace of Eternos against the technovirus, thereby placing them all under his control. With He-Man and Teela absent, Motherboard infiltrates and converts Castle Grayskull, thus cutting Adam and Cringer off from the source of their power and the Horde invades Eternia.
14	4	"The Dogs of War"	Adam Conarroe; Patrick Stannard	Tim Sheridan	January 25, 2024
Devastated at the revelation of Skeletor's true identity, Adam, Cringer, and Marlena are imprisoned in the dungeons of Eternos to await Adam's execution. Skeletor is haunted by his Keldor self, who entices him into destroying Motherboard and rebelling against Hordak. Teela and Evil-Lyn, soon joined by Duncan and Andra, return to Eternos to claim Skeletor's Havoc Staff and rescue Adam who dons one of his father's power suits to help. Despite interference by Hordak's lackeys, Gwildor and Orko succeed in enhancing the Power Sword. Tapping into Grayskull's magic, Skeletor outmaneuvers and kills Hordak right before Evil-Lyn steals the Havoc Staff from him. However, Skeletor begins combining both technology and magic into an overwhelmingly powerful force. In order to combat him, Teela tries to fuse the three staves into one, but the power released by this act threatens to overwhelm her.
15	5	"The Scepter and the Sword"	Adam Conarroe; Patrick Stannard	Kevin Smith	January 25, 2024
Gwildor and Orko return with the Power Sword just in time, allowing Adam to turn back into He-Man and provide Teela with the power she needs to complete the fusion. Once this is done, they freely admit their feelings for each other and kiss before they separate again to achieve their objectives. Duncan, Andra and Marlena engage the Horde fleet while Teela restores Preternia. He-Man first cures Castle Grayskull and Eternos' people from their nanite infections before battling Skeletor. Skeletor revives more of the ancient Techno Titans, but Randor, the heroes of Eternia both living and bygone, and Granamyr arrive to fight them, though Granamyr is mortally wounded. In their final clash, He-Man pierces Skeletor with his sword, purging him of his corruptions and turning him back into Keldor, and the spirits of Randor, the Sorceress, Granamyr, and the champions of the past find peace in the renewed Preternia. Following the victory, He-Man abolishes Eternia's monarchy in favor of a democracy, with Andra intending to become its first elected leader. He-Man and Teela make their relationship official. Evil-Lyn - now just Lyn - is welcomed into the ranks of Zodac's Cosmic Enforcers. Meanwhile, Horde Prime's servant Despara has recovered Hordak's body and is working on his resurrection.

== Production ==
=== Development ===
Netflix announced two new Masters of the Universe projects to be in development in December 2019: an adult-oriented anime series described as a direct sequel to the 1983 He-Man and the Masters of the Universe television series, and a CGI series aimed at children.

Kevin Smith officially announced Masters of the Universe: Revelation at the annual Power-Con convention in 2019, serving as showrunner and executive producer, writing for the series alongside Eric Carrasco, Tim Sheridan, Diya Mishra, and Fatman Beyond co-host Marc Bernardin. During promotion for the show, Smith said that Revelation came to be out of a desire to tell a story set in the world of Eternia, while also being able to resolve any lingering plot threads from the original series. He also said that the show is set up as if it were the next episode of the original series, while also still being accessible to those who have never seen the original show. In November, ND Stevenson expressed interest in a potential crossover Christmas special between the series and their 2018–20 Netflix original series She-Ra and the Princesses of Power despite this being a sequel to the original series and a non-DreamWorks cartoon.

In May 2022, Mark Hamill revealed he was recording more episodes of the series. The following month Netflix announced the title to be Masters of the Universe: Revolution.

=== Casting ===
The initial voice cast for the series was revealed, with Chris Wood as Prince Adam / He-Man and Mark Hamill as Skeletor. Three weeks before the show's premiere, three additional voice actors were announced to join the series with one of them being Dennis Haysbert to voice King Grayskull. In July 2022, Smith revealed that William Shatner had been cast in the sequel series, Masters of the Universe: Revolution. In March 2023, it was announced that Melissa Benoist would replace Sarah Michelle Gellar as Teela for Masters of the Universe: Revolution. In May 2023, a Mother's Day themed announcement revealed actress Meg Foster, who portrayed Evil-Lyn in the 1987 film, to be voicing Motherboard. In July 2023, Smith announced Keith David would be voicing Hordak. In January 2024, weeks before Revolution's release, Gates McFadden and John de Lancie were revealed to be joining the series, with McFadden replacing Alicia Silverstone as Marlena and de Lancie voicing Granamyr.

=== Animation ===
Around the same time as the show's announcement, Powerhouse Animation Studios was revealed to provide their services to the series, taking inspiration from Japanese anime.

=== Music ===
Bear McCreary composed the score of the series.

== Other media ==
=== Comic book ===
Dark Horse Comics and Mattel released a Masters of the Universe: Revelation comic as a tie-in to the series. The four-issue comic miniseries served as a prequel to the series. The first issue was released on July 7, 2021. An additional oneshot comic “Masters of the Universe: Andra” written by Tiffany Smith is scheduled for a July 2025 release.

=== Aftershow ===
An aftershow titled Revelations: The Masters of the Universe Revelation Aftershow premiered alongside the series premiere on July 23, 2021, with Kevin Smith, Rob David, and Tiffany Smith serving as hosts.

== Reception ==
Part 1 of Masters of the Universe: Revelation holds an approval rating of 92% based on 47 reviews, with an average rating of 7.3/10 on review aggregator website Rotten Tomatoes. The site's critics' consensus reads: "Armed with an incredible voice cast, Revelation smartly updates Masters of the Universe while retaining the quirky charms of the original to create a show that's bound to please fans and newcomers alike." Metacritic, which uses a weighted average, assigned a score of 72 out of 100 based on 8 critic reviews, indicating "generally favorable reviews".

Brian Tallerico, writing for RogerEbert.com, stated that "Smith and his team have threaded the needle that so many reboots fail to, making a show that feels both lovingly consistent with the source and fresh at the same time", and praised the show's visuals and voice acting. He concluded: "I think Masters of the Universe: Revelation will also send fans of it back to those originals as watchers of the '80s version show the new one to their kids". Kevin Johnson of The A.V. Club gave the show a grade of B, writing: "Smith and the creative team wink at and play into He-Man's corniest, outdated elements, but with a surprising amount of respect and admiration, while retaining a darker, richer sensibility."

Nick Schager, writing for The Daily Beast, said that the show "authentically resurrects the franchise's favorite characters while simultaneously updating them—and their adventures—for the 21st century", and concluded: "Masters of the Universe: Revelation is less about winning over newbies than about tapping into old fans' cherished memories of childhood days gone by. In that respect, it accomplishes its mission—and there is, to be sure, some chance that Powerhouse's sterling animation will alone convince a few He-Man novices to take the plunge." Amanda Dyer of Common Sense Media gave the series a score of 4 stars out of 5, describing it as "exciting and action-packed" and said that it "makes a smooth transition into a more female-centered cast by following a new journey led by Grayskull Guardian Teela."

Brian Lowry of CNN described the show's tone as "edgier and clearly more ambitious, beginning with the fact that there's actual fighting", and added that Smith "approaches it all seriously -- or at least as earnestly as you can when a guy hoists a sword and shouts "By the power of Grayskull!"". Lowry wrote: "For those expecting something truly boundary-pushing, rest assured, no one will confuse this with Clerks." Zaki Hasan, writing for the San Francisco Chronicle, said that "while it's invigorating to see this world and its characters gussied up with a 2021 coat of paint, the whole venture does threaten at times to stumble under the weight of its own oppressive grimness", also adding: "It's as if Smith was so determined to emphasize how grown-up the new show is he forgot that this was originally a story for kids — and that it's OK for that to still be the case." Variety noted some fans had reacted negatively to the show compared to the overwhelmingly positive views of critics.

Part 2 has an approval rating of 92% based on 12 reviews, with an average rating of 7.40/10 on Rotten Tomatoes. Matt Fowler of IGN gave it 7 out of 10 and said it "continued on its path of rich characters, eye-popping animation, and terrifically twisted tweaks to the old He-Man formula." Chris Jackson for Starburst Magazine, giving it 2 out of 5, noted "concerns over its ham-fisted handling of certain characters" and wrote that "overbearing exposition and a lack of action combine to take away any sense of urgency from what should have been the beginning of a non-stop five-episode thrill ride"

Revolution has an approval rating of 100% based on 11 reviews, with an average rating of 7.60/10 on Rotten Tomatoes.
