= He-Man and the Masters of the Universe =

American animated television series

- Title card
- Also known as: He-Man
- Genre: Action; Adventure; Sword and planet; Superhero
- Based on: Masters of the Universe by Mattel
- Developed by: Lou Scheimer
- Voices of: John Erwin; Alan Oppenheimer; Linda Gary; Erik Gunden; Erika Scheimer
- Theme music composer: Shuki Levy; Haim Saban
- Opening theme: "Masters of the Universe"
- Composers: Shuki Levy; Haim Saban; Erika Lane (Lou Scheimer)
- Country of origin: United States
- Original language: English
- No. of seasons: 2
- No. of episodes: 130 (along with the theatrical film He-Man and She-Ra: The Secret of the Sword, and the Christmas special "He-Man and She-Ra: A Christmas Special" (list of episodes)

Production
- Executive producer: Lou Scheimer
- Producer: Gwen Wetzler
- Running time: 23 minutes
- Production companies: Filmation Associates; Mattel

Original release
- Network: First-run syndication
- Release: September 26, 1983 – December 7, 1984

Related
- She-Ra: Princess of Power; The New Adventures of He-Man; He-Man and the Masters of the Universe (2002); He-Man and the Masters of the Universe (2021)

He-Man and the Masters of the Universe (often referred to simply as He-Man) is an American sword and planet animated television series, produced by Filmation and based on Mattel's toy line Masters of the Universe. The show was one of the most popular animated shows of the 1980s.

It made its television debut in September 1983 and ran until 1985, consisting of two seasons of 65 episodes each. Towards the end of the show's original run, it spawned one feature length theatrical movie He-Man and She-Ra: The Secret of the Sword, which served as the introduction for the show's spinoff sister series She-Ra: Princess of Power. Reruns continued to air in syndication until 1988, at which point USA Network bought the rights to the series. USA aired He-Man until September 1990. The success of the toy-based show in syndication greatly influenced other animation houses to produce half hour "cartoon commercials", and considerably changed the syndicated cartoon market.

The franchise has been adapted many times in comic book and comic strip form, and a live-action film was produced in 1987. A rebooted series, He-Man and the Masters of the Universe, renamed Masters of the Universe vs. The Snake Men during season 2, released on Toonami on August 16, 2002. Two series were released in 2021 for Netflix: one is Masters of the Universe: Revelation, a continuation for an adult audience and another is a family-oriented animated CGI reboot, also titled He-Man and the Masters of the Universe.

== Synopsis ==
The series takes place on Eternia, a planet of magic, myth and fantasy. Its lead character is Prince Adam, the young son of Eternia's rulers King Randor and Queen Marlena. Prince Adam is also the twin brother of Princess Adora. Whenever Prince Adam holds the Sword of Power aloft and proclaims "By the Power of Grayskull! I have the power!" he is endowed with "fabulous secret powers" and transformed into He-Man, the most powerful man in the universe. Together with his close allies, Battle Cat (who undergoes a similar transformation from being Adam's cowardly pet tiger Cringer), The Sorceress, Teela, Man-At-Arms and Orko, He-Man uses his powers to defend Eternia from the evil forces of Skeletor.

Skeletor's main goal is to conquer the mysterious fortress of Castle Grayskull, from which He-Man draws his powers. If successful, Skeletor would have enough power to rule all of Eternia and possibly the entire universe.

== Cast ==
- John Erwin as He-Man / Prince Adam, Beast Man, Ram-Man, Faker, Webstor, Whiplash, Strongarm, Icer, Granamyr, Count Marzo, Evilseed, Plundor, Kothos, Additional voices
- Alan Oppenheimer as Skeletor, Cringer / Battle Cat, Man-At-Arms, Mer-Man, Buzz-Off, Roboto, Chef Alan, Nepthu, Chimera, Additional voices
- Erik Gunden as Orko, King Randor, Stratos, Man-E-Faces, Mekaneck, Zodac, Fisto, Sy-Klone, Moss Man, Lizard Man, Trap Jaw, Tri-Klops, Kobra Khan, Clawful, Jitsu, Spikor, Two Bad, Modulok, King Miro, Fang Man, Batros, Additional voices
- Linda Gary as Teela, Evil-Lyn, Queen Marlena, Sorceress of Castle Grayskull, Hawke, Shokoti, Additional voices
- George DiCenzo as various male guest voices (uncredited)
- Erika Scheimer as various female guest voices

== Production history ==
The Mattel company released the first wave of the Masters of the Universe toyline in 1982. After the Federal Communications Commission relaxed its ban on toy-based children's programming, Mattel decided to commission a cartoon to promote their toyline. Based on their animated commercial work for Mattel, including a spot for the toyline, Filmation was chosen to produce the series. Mattel hired screenwriter Michael Halperin, experienced in live-action TV, to write a pitch Bible (submitted on December 1, 1982) to flesh out the backstory both for merchandising and for the cartoon. The bible introduced He-Man's alter-ego, as well as the planet Eternia, Queen Marlena's origin, among others. It was not considered viable, so the bible was reworked by Filmation staff writer Tom Ruegger, having already developed Blackstar along similar lines. Most of the character designs were handled by Herb Hazelton.

Some time after, both firms pitched the idea to the ABC network, who turned it down. Then, on Lou Scheimer's suggestion, the show was re-pitched and sold at the 1983 NATPE conference to independent stations. By March 28, the show had cleared 60% of the country; by August 29 half of the 65 episodes were completed. The resulting series, He-Man and the Masters of the Universe, debuted through barter syndication in September 1983, (Note: In the practice of barter syndication, production companies give television stations a series for free, in exchange for advertising.) and became the first syndicated show to be based on a toy. By 1984, it was seen on 120 U.S. stations and in more than 30 countries. By mid-1985, it was airing on 152 stations across the U.S., and was the most popular syndicated program with children 2–11 with a 10.9 rating in that demographic.

Despite the limited animation techniques that were used to produce the series, He-Man was notable for breaking the boundaries of censorship that had severely restricted the narrative scope of children's TV programming in the 1970s. For the first time since Ruby-Spears's Thundarr the Barbarian, a cartoon series could feature a muscular superhero who was actually allowed to hit people (although he more typically used wrestling-style moves rather than actually punching enemies), though he still could not use his sword often; more often than not He-Man opted to pick up his opponents and toss them away rather than hit them. The cartoon was controversial in that it was produced in connection with marketing a line of toys; advertising to children was itself controversial during this period. In the United Kingdom, advertising regulations forbade commercials for He-Man toys to accompany the program itself. In similar fashion to other shows at the time, notably G.I. Joe, an attempt to mitigate the negative publicity generated by this controversy was made by including a "life lesson" or "moral of the story" at the end of each episode. This moral was usually directly tied to the action or central theme of that episode.

The show was so successful that it spawned a spin-off series, She-Ra: Princess of Power, following the adventures of He-Man's sister, Princess Adora. Mattel's subsequent attempts to relaunch the He-Man toy line also led to the short-lived sequel series The New Adventures of He-Man in 1990, and a reboot of the franchise for a contemporary audience in 2002.

It is also noted for featuring early script-writing work from J. Michael Straczynski, later the creator of Babylon 5; Paul Dini and Brynne Stephens, both of whom who would go on to write acclaimed episodes of Batman: The Animated Series; Beast Wars story editor Larry DiTillio; and David Wise, later the head-writer of the TV version of Teenage Mutant Ninja Turtles and The Real Ghostbusters. In 2016, a new episode of He-Man was released.

== Music ==
The series' music was composed by Shuki Levy and Haim Saban. The opening theme, snippets of which are used whenever Prince Adam transforms into He-Man and during interludes, is in C Mixolydian.

In 1984, a soundtrack album was released in France and Argentina by CBS Records and reissued on compact disc by XIII Bis in 2012, featuring music from the series and an adaptation of "A Friend in Need" (French release)/"Diamond Ray of Disappearance" (Argentine release); La-La Land Records released a two-disc, limited-edition soundtrack album in 2015, containing the musical content of the 1983 LP and much previously unreleased material.

The Latin American Spanish-language version of the show features an actual theme song complete with lyrics unique to this version, with vocals by Chilean singer Memo Aguirre (a.k.a. "Captain Memo") based on Levy and Saban's original musical score.

In 1986, Brazilian children’s music group Trem da Alegria recorded a song about He-Man.

== Reception ==
He-Man and the Masters of the Universe is considered the most successful animated series ever made by Filmation. The show, as it was created to promote hyper-consumerism in children, left itself vulnerable to criticism. In 2009, IGN ranked the series as the 58th greatest animated show of all time in their Top 100 list.

== Home media ==
Between 1983 and 1986, RCA/Columbia Pictures Home Video released the series in VHS and Beta. BCI Eclipse LLC (under its Ink & Paint classic animation entertainment label) (under license from Entertainment Rights) released all 130 episodes of the original 1983 series of He-Man and the Masters of the Universe on DVD in Region 1 in 2005/2006, in 4 volume sets. Each episode on BCI Ink & Paint's He-Man and the Masters of the Universe DVD releases were uncut, unedited, fully restored and digitally remastered for optimum audio and video quality and presented in its original broadcast presentation and story continuity order. Each volume contains an extensive array of special features including documentaries, character profiles, commentaries, DVD-ROM features, trivia, photo galleries and more. As of 2009, these releases have been discontinued and are out of print as BCI Eclipse ceased operations.

On December 10, 2010, Mill Creek Entertainment announced that they had acquired the rights from Classic Media to re-release the series on DVD in the United States. They have subsequently re-released the complete first season in one eight-disc set as well as two smaller 20-episode volume releases. The complete second season was released on September 13, 2011. The 2002 series, composed of four discs; 960min, was also released in 2010 by Mill Creek Entertainment, and is titled Masters of the Universe: The Complete Series (ASIN B002DQL34G). Commemorating the 30th anniversary Masters of the Universe brand, Mill Creek Entertainment finally released the 30th Anniversary Commemorative Collection of the Masters of the Universe DVD. The 22-disc set features all 130 episodes of the 1983 series, 20 fan-favorite episodes of the 1990 series, as well as all 39 episodes of the 2002 series.

| DVD name | Ep# | Release date |
|---|---|---|
| The Complete First Season | 65 | February 15, 2011 |
| The Complete Second Season | 65 | September 13, 2011 |

Universal Pictures Home Entertainment released all 130 episodes of the original 1983 He-Man and the Masters of the Universe series on DVD in Region 1 on October 1, 2019, as He-Man and the Masters of the Universe: The Complete Original Series. This release includes He-Man & She-Ra: The Secret of the Sword and He-Man & She-Ra: A Christmas Special.

In Region 4, Madman Entertainment released the entire series on DVD in Australia in 4 volume sets (similar to BCI Eclipse releases). These releases have been discontinued and are now out of print. A complete series box set was released by Madman on June 24, 2009; this is still available.

The pilot episode, "Diamond Ray of Disappearance", has a minute or so of footage missing due to the master tapes being damaged. In the original version, after teleporting the King and Queen and Man-At-Arms away to another dimension, Skeletor turns the ray onto Orko, who gets stuck inside a vase which deflects the beam. Orko escapes to warn He-Man. This footage has not been lost; it is still existent on other media in circulation. However, complications over the rights to it prevented it from being inserted back into the DVD release.

== Sequel ==
An adult Netflix Original series Masters of the Universe: Revelation, was released in 2021. Although initially announced as a direct sequel to the 1983 TV series, director Kevin Smith later admitted the series is not set in the same continuity as the original, but described it as a 'spiritual sequel' to the Filmation series. Revelation was directed by Kevin Smith and animated by Powerhouse Animation Studios. The series aired for 10 episodes, split between two "parts".

A sequel series, Masters of the Universe: Revolution, debuted on Netflix on January 25, 2024. It consists of 5 episodes.

== Parody ==
- Hee Man: Master of None, a 1985 Filipino fantasy comedy film directed by Tony Y. Reyes and starring Redford White as the title character.
