= He-Man & She-Ra: A Christmas Special =

1985 American animated Christmas special

- DVD covers of A Christmas Special used in the USA and the UK
- Written by: Bob Forward; Don Heckman
- Directed by: Bill Reed; Ernie Schmidt
- Starring: John Erwin; Alan Oppenheimer; Linda Gary; Lana Beeson; Melendy Britt; George DiCenzo; Erika Scheimer; R. D. Robb
- Composers: Erika Lane; Shuki Levy; Folliott S. Pierpont; Haim Saban
- Country of origin: United States
- Original language: English

Production
- Producer: Lou Scheimer
- Cinematography: Thomas L. Callaway
- Running time: 44:25 minutes
- Production company: Filmation

Original release
- Network: syndication
- Release: December 25, 1985

He-Man & She-Ra: A Christmas Special is an American animated Christmas television special based on the animated series He-Man and the Masters of the Universe and its spin-off She-Ra: Princess of Power, originally broadcast in syndication December 1985. It is part of the same continuity as both those shows, and was created by the same Filmation production team and cast. In the special, Orko accidentally travels to Earth at Christmas time, where he encounters two children and brings them back to Eternia.

Although the 1985 airing was the special's only broadcast on television (save for some markets that aired it again for the next few years, and USA Network aired it a handful of times in the late 80s), it was later released on VHS and in 2005, DVD. Classic Media acquired the rights for the DVDs and re-released this special on October 12, 2010.

== Synopsis ==
While everybody in Eternia's royal palace is preparing for Adam and Adora's birthday, Adam is helping Man-At-Arms finish up the Sky Spy, a space shuttle intended to spy on Skeletor. The moment they head back to the palace, though, Orko gets inside the ship and messes around with the controls, causing the ship to blast off with him in it. Skeletor catches sight of the aircraft and, despite not knowing what it is or who is flying it, he gives chase after it in the Collector. Before he can take it down, He-Man and She-Ra, who are also unaware that Orko is in the Sky Spy, show up and punch a hole in the Collector, throwing it off course.

Orko, meanwhile, tries to get the Sky Spy to land by way of a magic spell, which causes the shuttle to disappear from Eternia's atmosphere and crash-land somewhere on Earth. Immediately following this, he meets two children named Miguel and Alisha, who had gone out to get their family's Christmas tree and become lost in doing so. Orko brings them into the crashed Sky Spy, where they explain Christmas to him.

Back on Eternia, everyone discovers that Orko is missing when they find his magic spellbook near the Sky Spy's launch pad. Man-At-Arms manages to pull up the coordinates for the Sky Spy's location, which Queen Marlena recognizes as Earth's coordinates. Unfortunately, Man-At-Arms' Transport Beam needs a Carium Water Crystal, of which there are none on Eternia, in order to gain enough power to bring Orko back. Adora suggests that there might be one on Etheria, and, after secretly transforming into She-Ra, rides off on Swift Wind.

Once on Etheria, She-Ra enlists the help of Mermista to attain the crystal, which is guarded by a fierce creature known as the Beast Monster. They manage to secure the crystal in their possession, but just as She-Ra and Swift Wind prepare to leave, they are halted by a group of huge android menaces, the Monstroids, having been told about them by some friends of hers known as the Manchines. The Monstroids trap them and leave for their headquarters, allowing She-Ra and Swift Wind to escape.

Upon Adora's return with the crystal, Man-At-Arms gets the Transport Beam working, and sure enough, Orko and the Sky Spy are transported back in, but Orko has brought Miguel, Alisha and their Christmas tree with them. After explanations are made, the children are told that it may take a few days for the crystal to recharge before they can return to Earth, and they are quite distressed that they might miss Christmas. Queen Marlena, sympathizing with these children from her own planet, decides to combine Adam and Adora's birthday party into a Christmas party. Meanwhile, Skeletor and Hordak are summoned by their supreme master, Horde Prime, who believes that the Christmas spirit that is now being brought to Eternia is the only thing that could stop his rise to power. He orders them to go capture the two Earth children, promising a reward, which sparks a fierce competition between Skeletor and Hordak.

Soon, just as Bow finishes writing a song he wrote about Christmas, Hordak shows up and uses a tractor beam to capture Miguel and Alisha, taking Orko with them. He and his minions do not get far, though, before their ship is brought down by the Monstroids, who take the children hostage to deal with Horde Prime themselves, and force Hordak and his men to retreat. Luckily, the Manchines show up to rescue Orko and the children. The Monstroids try to stop them from escaping, but He-Man and She-Ra, having been told of the children's location by Peekablue, show up just in time to handle them, with help from the other Manchines.

But during the battle Skeletor arrives and captures Miguel, Alisha, and a Manchine puppy named Relay. Hordak reappears and shoots down Skeletor's sky-scooter, crash-landing him in a snowy mountain range; because of this, Skeletor is now forced to bring his prisoners to Horde Prime on foot. During the trek, he experiences an uncharacteristic urge of kindness that results in him fitting the children with winter jackets to protect them from the cold, bringing Relay along so he doesn't freeze to death, and even protecting the children from a snowbeast. He also inquires the children about Christmas, all the while trying to reassure them - and himself - that he is still a bad guy.

Just as Horde Prime arrives in his ship, He-Man, She-Ra and Orko finally catch up. But Hordak also arrives, knocks Skeletor out by deflecting the latter's laser blast, and distracts He-Man and She-Ra by sending out his Horde Troopers. Just in the nick of time, Relay succeeds in waking Skeletor, who saves his would-be captives by shooting down Horde Prime's arriving ship. Infuriated, Horde Prime attempts to shoot Skeletor, but He-Man and She-Ra lift his ship up and throw it into space before he gets the chance. To He-Man's surprise, the children thank Skeletor for saving them, and Skeletor is relieved to learn that Christmas only happens once a year.

Back at the palace, as the good guys celebrate their Christmas party, Adam, dressed as Santa Claus, gives the children flying belts. Man-At-Arms then uses the Transporter to send Miguel and Alisha back to their home on Earth, where they are welcomed back by their parents. At the end of the special, Prince Adam and Orko deliver a very special Christmas moral. Adam states that "Though we celebrate it and get presents, Christmas is about caring, sharing and goodwill and its spirit is within all of us". And in fun fashion, Orko states that what makes him happy on Christmas is...presents.

== Cast ==
- John Erwin as Prince Adam / He-Man, Webstor
- Alan Oppenheimer as Skeletor, Man-At-Arms, Zipper
- Linda Gary as Teela, Queen Marlena
- Lana Beeson as Alicia
- Melendy Britt as Princess Adora / She-Ra, Mermista, Catra
- George DiCenzo as Hordak, Bow, Cutter
- Erika Scheimer as Peekablue, Perfuma, Mother
- R. D. Robb as Miguel
- Lou Scheimer as Orko, King Randor, Swift Wind, Spikor, Two-Bad, Modulok, Kowl, Rattlor, Horde Prime, Father, Multi-Bot (uncredited)

== DVD release ==
On December 6, 2005, BCI Eclipse LLC (under its Ink & Paint classic animation entertainment brand) (under license from Entertainment Rights PLC) released He-Man and She-Ra: A Christmas Special on DVD in Region 1 and Classic Media re-released the special on October 12, 2010. The special was also released in Region 2 (Universal Pictures UK) & Region 4 (Madman Entertainment).

DVD name	Region 1	Region 2	Region 4	Additional information
He-Man & She-Ra: A Christmas Special	December 6, 2005 (BCI)/ October 12, 2010 (Classic Media)	November 28, 2005	December 9, 2005	The Holidays and Morals of He-Man and the Masters of the Universe; The Heroes and Villains of He-Man and the Masters of the Universe; Art cards; I Have the Power music video featurette; A Montage of Morals; Character Profiles; Trivia and "fun facts"; The complete "Christmas Special" script in PDF format

== See also ==
- List of Christmas films
