= Masters of the Universe (1987 film) =

1987 film by Gary Goddard

- Theatrical release poster
- Directed by: Gary Goddard
- Written by: David Odell
- Based on: Masters of the Universe by: Mattel
- Produced by: Yoram Globus; Menahem Golan
- Starring: Dolph Lundgren; Frank Langella; Courteney Cox; James Tolkan; Christina Pickles; Meg Foster
- Cinematography: Hanania Baer
- Edited by: Anne V. Coates
- Music by: Bill Conti
- Production company: The Cannon Group, Inc.
- Distributed by: The Cannon Group, Inc.
- Release date: August 7, 1987
- Running time: 106 minutes
- Country: United States
- Language: English
- Budget: $22 million
- Box office: $17.3 million

Masters of the Universe is a 1987 American superhero film based on the Masters of the Universe franchise by Mattel. It was directed by Gary Goddard, produced by Yoram Globus and Menahem Golan, and written by David Odell. It stars Dolph Lundgren, Frank Langella, Courteney Cox, James Tolkan, Christina Pickles, and Meg Foster with supporting roles by Billy Barty, Jon Cypher, Chelsea Field, and Robert Duncan McNeill. The film follows two teenagers who meet He-Man, the most powerful man in the universe, who travels to Earth with his friends, Man-At-Arms and Teela, to stop their archenemy, the evil Skeletor from obtaining a cosmic key that will enable him to take over their home planet Eternia and the entire universe.

Masters of the Universe was released theatrically in the United States on August 7, 1987. It was a critical and commercial failure, grossing $17 million worldwide on a budget of $22 million. It was met with negative reviews from film critics, but is now regarded as a cult film. Another film adaptation was released in 2026.

== Plot ==
On the planet Eternia, the warlord Skeletor seizes control of Castle Grayskull, the center of power in the universe. His army scatters the remaining Eternian defenders and captures the Sorceress of Grayskull, imprisoning her within a power-draining field and planning to seize power over the entire universe by the next moonrise. Skeletor's archenemies—the warrior leader He-Man, veteran soldier Man-At-Arms, and his daughter Teela—rescue Thenurian locksmith Gwildor from Skeletor's troopers. Gwildor invented a "Cosmic Key" that can open a portal to anywhere by using musical notes, which was stolen by Skeletor's second-in-command Evil-Lyn allowing Skeletor to breach Castle Grayskull.

With Gwildor's remaining prototype of the Key, He-Man and his friends breach the Castle. They attempt to free the Sorceress, but are overwhelmed by Skeletor's army and forced to flee to Earth through a portal opened by Gwildor's Cosmic Key. The Key is lost upon their arrival and discovered by two California teenagers—orphaned high-school graduate Julie Winston and her boyfriend, aspiring musician Kevin Corrigan. While experimenting with the device, they accidentally transmit a signal. Tracking it, Evil-Lyn sends Skeletor's henchmen Saurod, Blade, Beastman and Karg to recover the device.

Kevin believes the Key to be a new synthesizer and takes it to a music store run by his friend Charlie. At the school, Skeletor's henchmen arrive through a portal and chase Julie, who is rescued by He-Man while he and his companions search for the Key. The henchmen retreat to Grayskull where, incensed by their failure, Skeletor vaporizes Saurod and sends the others back to Earth, with a larger force under Evil-Lyn's command. Kevin returns to the school to find police investigating the damage caused by Skeletor's men, and no sign of Julie.

Kevin is taken to Julie's house by Hugh Lubic, a detective investigating the disturbance. They find no trace of Julie, but Lubic is suspicious of the Key, which he suspects Kevin may have stolen. He confiscates it and leaves for Charlie's store to verify Kevin's story. Evil-Lyn and her team break into the house and interrogate Kevin regarding the Key's location using a mind-control collar, before pursuing Lubic.

Julie and the Eternians arrive and release Kevin from the collar, then pursue Lubic and the Key. They arrive at Charlie's store, but Skeletor's forces intercept them and a battle ensues. Evil-Lyn recovers the Key and summons Skeletor to Earth. Skeletor's forces capture the Eternians and wound Julie, which simultaneously erases the memory storage of Gwildor's Key. He-Man surrenders to save his comrades and is returned to Eternia as Skeletor's slave. Skeletor attempts to torture He-Man into submission to make his victory complete, but He-Man refuses to yield. The moment arrives for Skeletor to receive the power of the cosmos and declare himself the Master of the Universe.

On Earth, Gwildor repairs the Key, and Kevin re-creates the tones necessary to create a gateway to Eternia. The group, including Lubic as he attempts to arrest them, are transported to Castle Grayskull and begin battling Skeletor's forces. Resenting that Skeletor absorbed the power of the universe without sharing it with her, Evil-Lyn orders Karg to sound the retreat. He-Man retrieves the Sword of Grayskull and shatters Skeletor's staff in a duel, restoring the latter to his normal state.

He-Man offers mercy, but Skeletor draws a concealed sword and attempts to kill him. To stop him, He-Man knocks Skeletor into a pit below to his apparent death. The freed Sorceress heals Julie, and Gwildor opens a portal to send the Earthlings home. Hailed as a hero for his bravery, Lubic decides to remain on Eternia.

Julie awakens on the morning of her parents' deaths in a plane crash. Realizing the Key transported her back in time, she prevents her parents from taking the ill-fated flight in the previous timeline. Kevin later confirms to her that their experiences were real, producing a souvenir from Eternia: a sphere containing a scene of He-Man with his sword in front of Castle Grayskull.

== Cast ==
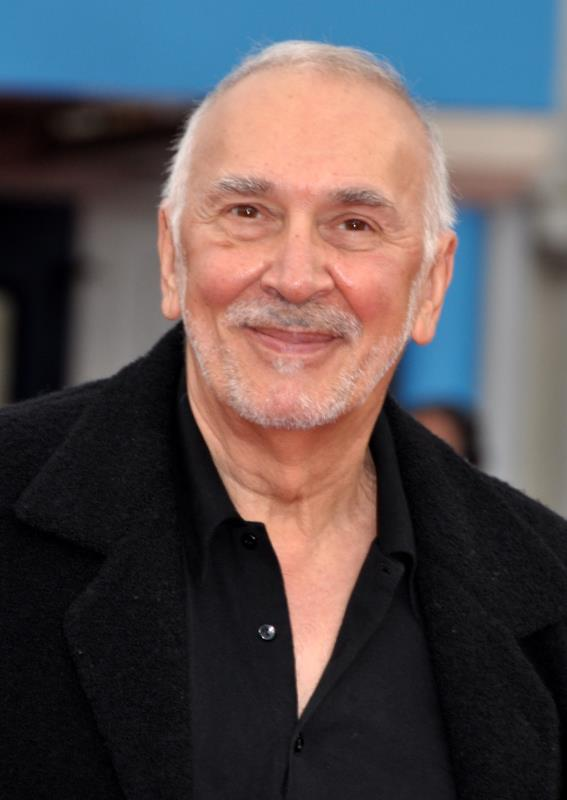
Frank Langella in 2012. Langella accepted the role of Skeletor because of his son's love of the character.

- Dolph Lundgren as He-Man, the champion of Eternia
- Frank Langella as Skeletor, the leader of the Evil Warriors and He-Man's archenemy
- Meg Foster as Evil-Lyn, a witch who is a member of the Evil Warriors
- Billy Barty as Gwildor, a Thenurian who invented the Cosmic Key. He was created to replace Orko, who was going to appear in the film, but was scrapped due to his design being too complex to produce in live action.
- Courteney Cox as Julie Winston, a teenager on Earth who finds the Cosmic Key
- Robert Duncan McNeill as Kevin Corrigan, a teenager and friend of Julie who finds the Cosmic Key
- Jon Cypher as Man-At-Arms, an ally of He-Man
- Chelsea Field as Teela, the daughter of Man-At-Arms and ally of He-Man
- James Tolkan as Hugh Lubic, a detective that has his encounters with the Eternians
- Christina Pickles as Sorceress, the protector of Castle Grayskull
- Tony Carroll as Beastman, an animalistic member of the Evil Warriors who makes animalistic sounds
- Pons Maar as Saurod, a lizard man member of the Evil Warriors
- Anthony De Longis as Blade, a sword-wielding member of the Evil Warriors who wears an eyepatch
- Robert Towers as Karg, a bat-like member of the Evil Warriors who commands Skeletor's soldiers and interprets for Beast Man
- Barry Livingston as Charlie, a music store owner and Kevin's friend
- Gwynne Gilford as Catherine Winston, Julie's mother
- Walter Scott as William Winston, Julie's father
- Walt P. Robles as Carl, the janitor
- Cindi Eyman as Gloria, Julie's friend and co-worker
- Peter Brooks as narrator
- Richard Szponder as Pigboy, a member of the Evil Warriors with a pig-like face who gives Skeletor his staff

== Production ==
=== Development and writing ===
The Masters of the Universe toyline started in 1982, which was then followed up by the animated television series He-Man and the Masters of the Universe from 1983 to 1985. In 1985 the animated film The Secret of the Sword was the first theatrically released film to star He-Man and feature Masters of the Universe characters. Work then started on producing a live action Masters of the Universe film. One of the original drafts from the script by David Odell included more time spent on Eternia and revealed that He-Man's mother was originally from Earth.

Describing her character, Meg Foster said Evil-Lyn is not villainous, "she is just doing her job and she knows how to get results, even if it means being harsh". Frank Langella agreed, calling her a female more dedicated to Skeletor's cause than any man; she is obsessive around him because she loves him. The filmmakers considered having Foster wear contact lenses to mask her naturally pale blue eyes, but decided they fit the character better. They augmented her chest, fitting cleavage into the costume. She wanted Evil-Lyn to have a long hairstyle, rather than the short style featured in the film. Mattel objected, considering it too far a departure from the toy. Orko was initially supposed appear in the film, but he was too complex to produce in live-action so he was replaced by an original character Gwildor.

When offered the role, Langella said that he "didn't even blink ... I couldn't wait to play him". He cited his then-four-year-old son Frank III's love of Skeletor while running around his house yelling He-Man's battle cry "I have the power!" as the reason he played He-Man's archenemy.

=== Filming ===
According to director Gary Goddard, Mattel caused problems for the production crew by not paying their half of the production budget on time. A member of staff was forced to put lens caps on cameras on several shooting days, to prevent any more filming from taking place. Due to the production running out of budget, Goddard had to finance the filming of the battle scene between He-Man and Skeletor himself. Only Lundgren and Langella were present along with a skeleton crew, with the set's lighting made dark to emphasize the actors' presence.

Mattel was also initially very controlling over how He-Man was depicted in the film, insisting that the character could not appear doing anything morally wrong, such as swearing or killing. Sales of He-Man toys dipped in the middle of production, after which Goddard noted that Mattel relaxed their rules and allowed the director to have more liberties with the character.

During filming, Mattel held a contest for children for a chance to appear in the film. Richard Szponder won the competition, but his victory was announced as filming was nearing completion. All the scenes taking place on Earth had been shot, so Goddard cast Szponder as the minion character Pigboy, who holds Skeletor's staff as he returns to Grayskull.

Two sound stages needed to be connected to film the interior of Castle Grayskull, with matte paintings filling in the pits of the central walk-way. Unhappy with Dolph Lundgren's reading of He-Man's dialogue, Goddard initially planned to have Lundgren's dialogue dubbed over by another actor, but was not permitted to do so due to contractual reasons. Lundgren's dialogue was subsequently re-recorded and dubbed over the original footage to better meet Goddard's standards. Langella told the press he loved playing Skeletor and worked very hard to make the role as exciting as possible, remarking that it was a positive experience.

Director Gary Goddardsaid the original cut featured a longer and emotional farewell scene inspired by The Wizard of Oz where Julie Winston (Courteney Cox) had individual lines with each Eternian. The studio demanded the scene be tightened up, but the footage still exists.

=== Jack Kirby inspiration ===
Comic book writer and artist John Byrne compared the film to Jack Kirby's comic book metaseries Fourth World, stating in Comic Shop News #497:

The best New Gods movie, IMHO, is Masters of the Universe. I even corresponded with the director, who told me this was his intent, and that he had tried to get [Jack] Kirby to do the production designs, but the studio nixed it. Check it out. It requires some bending and an occasional sex change (Metron becomes an ugly dwarf, The Highfather becomes the Sorceress), but it's an amazingly close analog, otherwise. And Frank Langella's Skeletor is a dandy Darkseid!

Director Gary Goddard clarified this in a letter appearing in John Byrne's Next Men No. 26, in which he stated:

As the director of Masters of the Universe, it was a pleasure to see that someone got it. Your comparison of the film to Kirby's New Gods was not far off. In fact, the storyline was greatly inspired by the classic Fantastic Four/Doctor Doom epics, The New Gods and a bit of Thor thrown in here and there. I intended the film to be a "motion picture comic book," though it was a tough proposition to sell to the studio at the time. 'Comics are just for kids,' they thought. They would not allow me to hire Jack Kirby who I desperately wanted to be the conceptual artist for the picture... I grew up with Kirby's comics (I've still got all my Marvels from the first issue of Fantastic Four and Spider-Man through the time Kirby left) and I had great pleasure meeting him when he first moved to California. Since that time I enjoyed the friendship of Jack and Roz and was lucky enough to spend many hours with Jack, hearing how he created this character and that one, why a villain has to be even more powerful than a hero, and on and on. Jack was a great communicator, and listening to him was always an education. You might be interested to know that I tried to dedicate Masters of Universe to Jack Kirby in the closing credits, but the studio took the credit out.

Brian Cronin, author of the "Comic Book Urban Legends Revealed" column, concludes that "the film itself was not intended to be literally a reworked Fourth World, although the intent WAS to make the film a tribute to Jack Kirby—just a tribute to ALL of his work, not just the Fourth World."

== Music ==
The musical score of Masters of the Universe was composed by Bill Conti. It was recorded by several European orchestras, chiefly the Graunke Orchestra of Munich, the only one credited on the soundtrack album, and conducted by a number of conductors, chiefly Bruce Miller and Harry Rabinowitz. Rabinowitz received sole credit. Conti did not conduct his score because it could not be recorded in the United States as "there was a musicians strike or something like that ... So it went to various places." He and score mixer Dan Wallin assembled the score from the various recorded takes, because there were problems with the orchestral performances.

== Reception ==
=== Box office ===
Prior to releasing the film, The Cannon Group touted Masters of the Universe as the Star Wars of the 1980s. Despite releasing in the wake of the success of the toy line, animated series and related merchandise, Masters of the Universe began as the third-highest-grossing film of the weekend in North America on August 7, 1987, earning $4,883,168, behind Stakeout ($5,170,403) and The Living Daylights ($7,706,230). It quickly left the charts, with a North American gross of $17,336,370. The film was released in the Philippines by Solar Films on September 10, 1987.

=== Critical response ===
On the review aggregator website Rotten Tomatoes, 20% of 35 critics' reviews are positive, with an average rating of 3.7/10. The website's consensus reads: "Masters of the Universe is a slapdash adaptation of the He-Man mythos that can't overcome its cynical lack of raison d'etre, no matter how admirably Frank Langella throws himself into the role of Skeletor." Metacritic, which uses a weighted average, assigned the film a score of 35 out of 100, based on 10 critics, indicating "generally unfavorable" reviews.

Variety called it a "Conan-Star Wars hybrid ripoff" and "a colossal bore". Walter Goodman of The New York Times wrote, "If you liked the toy, you'll love the movie." Michael Wilmington of the Los Angeles Times called it "a misfiring, underdone epic". Johanna Steinmetz of the Chicago Tribune wrote that the film, while predictable and derivative, entertains audiences through its side plots set on Earth.

Several reviewers praised Frank Langella's portrayal of Skeletor, including Rose DeWolf in the Philadelphia Daily News (though saying his costume looked like a Halloween mask) and Roger Hulburt of the South Florida Sun Sentinel.

In a retrospective review, Glenn Heath Jr. of Slant Magazine called it a "jarring mix of corny screwball comedy and choppy action heroics." Chris Eggertsen of HitFix, in an article identifying the film's campy, positive qualities, called it "an objectively bad film with a big heart." Joshua Winning of Digital Spy wrote, "...beloved of '80s kids but scorned by critics, it's a high camp oddity that we should celebrate on its own terms."

=== Accolades ===
The film was nominated for Best Science Fiction Film, Best Costumes (Julie Weiss) and Best Special Effects (Richard Edlund) at the 15th Saturn Awards, where Gary Goddard also received a special Silver Scroll Award for Outstanding Achievement. At the 1988 Fantasporto Festival, the film was nominated for Best Film and won Best Special Effects. Billy Barty was nominated for a Golden Raspberry Award for Worst Supporting Actor for the film at the 8th Golden Raspberry Awards.

=== Legacy ===
The commercial failure of Masters of the Universe, among other films such as Superman IV: The Quest for Peace and Lifeforce, contributed to the eventual closure of Cannon Films. Masters of the Universe was Lundgren's first leading role in a feature film following his success in Rocky IV and he later labeled it as his least favorite film role. Langella considers Skeletor one of his favorite roles. The year the film was released also saw a sharp decline in the Masters of the Universe brand, with sales of He-Man toys falling 98% in 1987 compared to the year before, which former Mattel designer Roger Sweet attributed at least in part to an oversupply of toys that went unsold.

Skeletor's question to He-Man ("Tell me about the loneliness of good, He-Man. Is it equal to the loneliness of evil?") is slightly reworded in the Injustice vs. Masters of the Universe, a comic crossover with the Injustice franchise.

Gwildor, a character created for Masters of the Universe as a replacement for Orko due to the complexity of the character to make in live action and portrayed by Barty, was featured in 2024's Masters of the Universe: Revolution voiced by Ted Biaselli. In it he serves much of the same role of inventor as he does in the film, and also poses as a foil to Orko (Griffin Newman).

== Canceled sequel ==
In 1987, Globus announced a sequel, Masters of the Universe 2, at the 1987 Cannes Film Festival. Despite Lundgren's refusal to reprise the role—reportedly because he disliked the first film and instead chose to star in Cannon's Red Scorpion (1989)—the project moved forward with surfer Laird Hamilton cast as his replacement. Director Albert Pyun was attached to the project, having also been linked to Cannon's planned Spider-Man adaptation, with both films reportedly set to have budgets of $2 million.

However, due to Cannon's financial troubles after the box-office failures of the first Masters film and Superman IV (1987), the company refused to pay Mattel the royalties for the use of the characters. Mattel was not pleased with the sequel's script, and the project was canceled. The film rights reverted to Mattel. To avoid wasting the sets and costumes already prepared for the sequel, and for an unmade Spider-Man film, Cannon produced a small, low-budget movie starring Jean-Claude Van Damme, Cyborg (1989).

== Reboot ==
From the 1990s to the 2020s, rumors of a possible reboot circulated several times, including one allegedly involving John Woo, though these were never confirmed. In 2007, Variety reported that Warner Bros., producer Joel Silver and screenwriter Justin Marks were developing a potential film featuring updated characters and a visual style similar to 300. These and later projects repeatedly stalled, leaving the new film trapped in development hell.

In January 2019, it was reported that Art Marcum and Matt Holloway would rewrite the reboot screenplay. In February 2019, Aaron and Adam Nee were chosen as directors for a film to be produced by Sony Pictures, with principal photography scheduled to begin in mid-July 2019 in Prague. In March 2019, Noah Centineo was cast as He-Man. In April 2021, the actor dropped out of the role, after more than two years with no updates on the project, despite its original release date having been set for March 5, 2021. In June 2021, rumors began to circulate of a new film to be produced and distributed by Netflix. The news was confirmed in January 2022: the Nee brothers would direct, and Kyle Allen was cast as He-Man. In 2023, the project was cancelled.

In 2024, a new film was announced as a reboot of the 1987 Cannon version, this time produced by Amazon MGM Studios and Mattel Films, directed by Travis Knight, with British actor Nicholas Galitzine starring as He-Man and with Lundgren in a cameo role. It was released worldwide on June 5, 2026.

== Home media ==
The soundtrack album was released on record, cassette, and compact disc by Varèse Sarabande in 1987. It was subsequently issued in an expanded version by Edel. In 2008, La-La Land Records released a two-disc edition with the complete score and the original album presentation. In 2012, Intrada Records issued the complete score, the entirely of disc one and tracks 1–5 on disc two, on one disc. Masters of the Universe was released on DVD in October 2001. A 25th Anniversary Edition Blu-ray was released by Warner Home Video in October 2012.

In May 2026, Amazon MGM announced a 4K UHD Blu Ray remaster from Toy Robot Video, alongside a never before seen Preview Cut, featuring new and extended material that was previously thought to be lost.

== Video game ==
Masters of the Universe: The Movie, a video game based on the film.

== Bibliography ==
- "Masters of the Universe". SFX (240). Future plc: 82–85. November 2013.
