= He-Man =

Superhero character

- Masters of the Universe character
- Art by Alfredo Alcala
- First appearance: He-Man and the Power Sword (1981)
- Created by: Roger Sweet
- Voiced by: John Erwin (He-Man and the Masters of the Universe, He-Man and She-Ra: The Secret of the Sword, She-Ra: Princess of Power, He-Man and She-Ra: A Christmas Special); Doug Parker (Prince Adam) / Garry Chalk (He-Man) (The New Adventures of He-Man); Cam Clarke (He-Man and the Masters of the Universe (2002)); Chris Wood (Masters of the Universe: Revelation); Yuri Lowenthal (He-Man and the Masters of the Universe (2021))
- Portrayed by: Dolph Lundgren; Nicholas Galitzine
- Other official superhero name: Musclor
- Real name: Adam

In-universe information
- Nickname: The Most Powerful Man in the Universe
- Species: Human/Eternian Hybrid
- Gender: Male
- Title: Prince
- Occupation: Prince of Eternia; Warrior of Castle Grayskull
- Family: He-Ro (ancestor); King Grayskull (ancestor); King Miro (grandfather); King Randor (father); Queen Marlena (mother); Princess Adora / She-Ra (twin sister); Keldor / Skeletor (uncle) (Note: Skeletor is depicted as He-Man's uncle—and King Randor's brother—only in some continuities, such as the 2002 and 2021 reboots.); Teela (wife) (Note: Only in the expanded MOTU/POP continuity); Dare / He-Ro (son)
- Abilities: Superhuman strength, stamina, durability, endurance, speed, agility, reflexes, and wisdom; Immortality; Combat experience; The Power Sword grants: Nigh indestructibility; Energy absorption and projection; Shapeshifting

He-Man is a superhero and the protagonist of the sword and planet franchise Masters of the Universe, which includes a toy line, several animated television series, comic books, and two feature films. He-Man is characterized by his superhuman strength and in most variations, is the alter ego of Prince Adam. He-Man and his friends attempt to defend the secrets of Castle Grayskull, the planet Eternia, and the rest of the universe from the evil forces of his uncle and archenemy Skeletor. He-Man is also the twin brother of She-Ra.

The character was created by designer Mark Taylor, who based the character on his childhood drawings. One of Taylor's designs was used by Mattel designer Roger Sweet in his pitch to Mattel for a new action figure line. Sweet also chose the name "He-Man" and suggested that it has a twist-action waist. Sweet sculpted and presented three different versions of the figure to Mattel—including a soldier, spaceman, and barbarian—the barbarian version was chosen and developed into the character's current form. Afterwards, Sweet was taken off the project and Taylor was assigned principal design duties.

The television series He-Man and the Masters of the Universe rapidly increased the selling of Mattel's toys and was a huge success in the 1980s, gaining nine million viewers in its first year in the US alone and being broadcast to at least 37 countries. The massive success of the series led to a feature-length movie in 1985, He-Man and She-Ra: The Secret of the Sword, from the same production team, and a shared continuity, spin-off/sister series She-Ra: Princess of Power. There was also a primetime, hour-long Christmas special, He-Man and She-Ra: A Christmas Special.

Since his creation, He-Man has often attracted attention for his perceived homoeroticism, with critics and academics recognizing the gay subtext surrounding his character. Following the airing of the original cartoon, He-Man has become a gay icon and amassed an LGBT following; particularly among gay men.

== Development ==
In 1976, Mattel's CEO Ray Wagner declined a deal to produce a toy line of action figures based on the characters from Star Wars, due to the $750,000 license ($4,008,703.87 in 2023 dollars) required up front. Following the commercial success of the original Star Wars trilogy and its related merchandise, Mattel launched "...failed line after failed line, none of which captured the public's imagination or made a significant dent in the toy market."

In the race to design the next popular action figure, Roger Sweet—lead designer for Mattel's Preliminary Design Department—realized that simplicity was the key to success. He also knew, as he said in his 2005 book Mastering the Universe: He-Man and the Rise and Fall of a Billion-Dollar Idea, that the marketing department primarily needed to be persuaded that the toy would sell.

He argued that the generically named He-Man, a powerful figure, could apply to any context. In late 1980, he presented Wagner with three prototypes, which he created by gluing a Big Jim figure—another Mattel toy line—into a battle action pose, adding clay to its body, and having plaster casts made. One of these prototypes was the precursor to He-Man.

== Appearances ==
=== Comics ===
In the illustrated books released with the first series of toys, He-Man is a barbarian from an Eternian tribe. The planet's inhabitants were dealing with the aftermath of the Great Wars, which devastated the civilizations that once ruled. The wars left behind advanced machinery and weaponry, known only to select people. The Sorceress of Castle Grayskull gave He-Man some of these weapons, and he set out to defend the secrets of Castle Grayskull from the evil Skeletor. He-Man possessed one half of the Power Sword; Skeletor had the second half and used it as his main weapon. When joined, the two halves provide the key to Castle Grayskull. In one early illustrated story, He-Man and Skeletor united their two Power Sword halves to form the true Power Sword, defeating Trap Jaw.

==== He-Man and the Masters of the Universe (2012) ====
In June 2012, DC Comics began publishing a six-issue limited series, He-Man and the Masters of the Universe, alongside the weekly digital-first series Masters of the Universe. In He-Man: The Eternity War, He-Man is shown as married to Teela.

=== Television ===
==== He-Man and the Masters of the Universe (1983) ====
Prince Adam as He-Man, from the Filmation cartoon in which John Erwin provided the character's voice

In the animated series, He-Man's origins were revised. His true identity is Prince Adam of Eternia, ruler of the Kingdom of Eternia on the planet of the same name, son of King Randor and Queen Marlena The Sorceress of Grayskull gave Prince Adam the ability to transform into He-Man by raising his Power Sword and proclaiming, "By the power of Grayskull..." Once the transformation was complete, he would continue, "...I have the power!" The differences between Prince Adam and He-Man were minimal; He-Man had a slightly deeper voice, a different wardrobe, and slightly darker skin and hair.

Prince Adam's pet is a cowardly green tiger named Cringer. When Adam becomes He-Man, he transforms Cringer into a brave armored green tiger named Battle Cat, which serves as He-Man's steed and fighting companion. He-Man could use his sword to give other friends, allies, and animals power and enhanced abilities as well.

Adam is friendly with Teela, Captain of the Guard and the adopted daughter of Prince Adam's mentor Duncan/Man-At-Arms. Unaware of his identity as He-Man, she sees Adam as lazy and cowardly, an act he keeps up to conceal his secret identity.

Man-At-Arms is He-Man's closest companion and the Eternian royal family's innovator of technology and weapons. He often unveils new weapons or devices to help He-Man.

Castle Grayskull is the source of He-Man's powers, where the Sorceress who granted Adam his transformative abilities lives and communicates telepathically with him. To protect his family He-Man keeps his double identity a secret, sharing it only with Orko, Man-At-Arms, Cringer, and the Sorceress.

He-Man's archenemy is Skeletor, a blue-skinned sorcerer with a yellow skull for a head. Skeletor is skilled in black magic and all forms of combat, being cunning and intelligent. Skeletor is assisted in his schemes by a group of henchmen.

==== She-Ra: Princess of Power (1985) ====
The spin-off series She-Ra: Princess of Power introduced Adam's twin sister: Princess Adora, a leader of the Great Rebellion against Hordak on the planet Etheria. Adora, like Adam, wields the power of Grayskull and uses a sword to transform into She-Ra, Princess of Power. He-Man made several appearances in the series.

==== The New Adventures of He-Man (1990) ====
After the original Masters of the Universe toy line came to an end, Mattel sought to revive interest in He-Man by launching a new line simply titled He-Man. The mini-comics packaged with the figures introduced a revised storyline in which He-Man leaves Eternia and pursues Skeletor into deep space. Skeletor has set his ambitions on conquering the distant planet Primus, a world rich in advanced technological resources.

In this iteration, He-Man is portrayed as having fully abandoned his identity as Prince Adam. He establishes himself on Primus, where he leads a team of defenders known as the Galactic Guardians. His visual design was also reimagined for the new toy line: He-Man wears a space helmet and golden armor, giving him a distinctly futuristic appearance, and his sword was redesigned to match this updated aesthetic.

A cartoon series was produced by Jetlag Productions to accompany the toy line, entitled The New Adventures of He-Man. Although generally following the storyline from the mini-comics, this series maintained the double identity of Prince Adam and He-Man. On the planet Primus, Prince Adam posed as a traveling merchant and the nephew of Master Serbian to disguise his secret identity. His transformation oath was altered slightly, to become "By the power of Eternia..."

==== He-Man and the Masters of the Universe (2002) ====
To tie in with a new line of action figures based upon the original toyline, a new He-Man cartoon series was produced in 2002–03 by Mike Young Productions, titled He-Man and the Masters of the Universe and given the marketing subtitle "vs. the Snake Men" in its second season. This series retold the Masters of the Universe story from the beginning. He-Man's origin was told in a 90-minute series premiere, in which the 16-year-old Prince Adam was summoned to Castle Grayskull by the Sorceress to assume the identity of He-Man and his role as Eternia's defender.

The portrayal of his character in this series was consistent with Filmation's portrayal, although the character of Prince Adam was brasher and more youthfully energetic than his 1980s counterpart (conveying the image of a teenage boy saddled with the responsibility of defending a planet from evil). The Adam/He-Man character was redesigned to make the character's secret identity more credible.

==== Masters of the Universe (CGI reboot, 2021) ====
In December 2019, it was announced that in addition to their other series, Netflix would also be developing a new Masters of the Universe series using CGI animation. Rob David developing the series, producing it alongside Adam Bonnett, Christopher Keenan, Jeff Matsuda, and Susan Corbin. Bryan Q. Miller serves as story editor on the series. Animation services were provided by House of Cool and CGCG Inc.

==== Masters of the Universe: Tales From Eternia (web series, 2026) ====
On June 19, 2026, the 2D animated web series Masters of the Universe: Tales From Eternia was released on YouTube. The series is produced by Mattel Studios in partnership with Snipple Animation.

=== Film ===
==== Chip 'n Dale: Rescue Rangers ====
He-Man and Skeletor both make cameo appearances in the 2022 film Chip 'n Dale: Rescue Rangers.

==== Reboot film ====
On April 29, 2019, actor Noah Centineo confirmed in an appearance on The Tonight Show Starring Jimmy Fallon that he would be playing He-Man in the Masters of the Universe reboot film, which was due to begin production in July 2019 and set for a 2020 release. However, due to the ongoing COVID-19 pandemic, he pulled out of casting two years later. In January 2022, it was announced that Kyle Allen had been cast in the role, with filming to begin that summer. The movie was then canceled by Netflix and acquired by Amazon MGM. Nicholas Galitzine was cast as the character in May 2024.

=== Merchandise ===
==== Masters of the Universe Classics (2008) ====
This action-figure line combined elements from the He-Man universe into a cohesive storyline with biographies on the figures' packaging.

A decade on from the cancellation of the Filmation cartoon series, Lou Scheimer pitched a sequel series to Mattel in 1995 called He-Ro: Son of He-Man and the Masters of the Universe, in which He-Man was now King of Eternia, married to Teela, and had a son, Dare, who inherited the Sword of Power from him, using it to become the title character He-Ro, leading his comrades into battle against a returned Skeletor. The show was not picked up, although its premise later influenced the fictional biographies for the characters in the Masters of the Universe Classics toy line.

These biographies suggested that several "He-Men" have come into existence—such as Vikor (based on an early concept design for the vintage He-Man), Oo-Larr (based on the jungle He-Man from the first minicomic. Adam takes over as King of Eternia as King He-Man, marries Teela, and they have a son named Dare.

== Portrayals ==
- John Erwin (1983–1985, 2005; He-Man and the Masters of the Universe, The Secret of the Sword, She-Ra: Princess of Power, He-Man & She-Ra: A Christmas Special, Family Guy (Prince Adam))
- Jack Wadsworth (1987; Masters of the Universe Power Tour)
- Dolph Lundgren (1987; Masters of the Universe)
- Doug Parker (1990; The New Adventures of He-Man (Prince Adam))
- Garry Chalk (1990; The New Adventures of He-Man (He-Man))
- Cam Clarke (2002–2005, 2016; He-Man and the Masters of the Universe (2002), He-Man: Defender of Grayskull, He-Man: Tappers of Grayskull, He-Man: Tappers of Grayskull Miniseries)
- David A. Kaye (2002–2003; He-Man and the Masters of the Universe (2002) (Prince Adam, young))
- Chris Wood (2021–2024; Masters of the Universe: Revelation)
- Yuri Lowenthal (2021; He-Man and the Masters of the Universe (2021))
- Nicholas Galitzine (2026; Masters of the Universe)
- Aidan Reimer (2026; Masters of the Universe: Tales From Eternia)

=== Additional voice actors ===
- Burr Middleton (1982; Mattel commercial)
- Keith Scott (1985; Streets commercial)
- Rich Orlow (2017; GEICO commercial)
- Alan Oppenheimer (2022; Chip 'n Dale: Rescue Rangers)

=== Parodies ===
- Macaulay Culkin (2005; Robot Chicken (Prince Adam))
- Adam Talbott (2005; Robot Chicken)
- Patrick Pinney (2007–2008, 2011–2012, 2018; Robot Chicken)
- Kevin Urban (2014; Family Guy: The Quest for Stuff)
- Seth Green (2014; Robot Chicken)
- Chris Pratt (2014; Saturday Night Live)

== Queer interpretations and gay icon status ==
David Chlopecki argues that Prince Adam's appearance, such as his pink spandex clothing, conforms to gay stereotypes, while NPR said the character's appearance adds to the show's gay subtext because He-Man's outfit resembles those of leather subculture, and including a bondage harness, which in the 1980s was considered to be homoerotic imagery. Attention has also been paid to Adam's transformation into He-Man through what one of his origin stories describes as his "fabulous powers" and his sword, which Comic Book Resources's Anthony Gramuglia described as "phallic".

The character's double life has also been noted as queer subtext. According to Battis, Adam's need to "hide his true identity as [He-Man]" is one of the show's key queer aspects. British newspaper The Daily Telegraph noted fan interpretations that the character's dual identity represents a man's struggle to accept his sexuality; Prince Adam is closeted while He-Man is "out-and-proud". Writing for The Johns Hopkins News-Letter, Matt Johnson described the series' depiction of He-Man as a "thinly veiled treatise on the state of gay male sexuality in the eighties".

Adam B. Vary said the original cartoon series contains gay subtext, which the 1987 live-action movie Masters of the Universe almost turns into explicit text, portraying a "tragic unrequited romance between He-Man and Skeletor", singling out Skeletor's "warped obsession" with He-Man and He-Man never showing an interest in women. The homoeroticism of He-Man's relationship with Man-at-Arms was highlighted in a re-cut trailer uploaded to YouTube titled "Brokeback Snake Mountain".

=== Gay icon and fandom ===
The perceived homoerotic subtexts in He-Man resulted in the character and show drawing a gay audience when the cartoon first aired, and as a result, the character is now viewed as a gay icon. Men's Health reported gay men were one of the three core groups that were collectors of He-Man toys at conventions, alongside body builders and law-enforcement. ND Stevenson, the creator, showrunner, and executive producer of She-Ra and the Princesses of Power (2018–2020), has also stated that He-Man—alongside She-Ra—is a gay icon, and the character's LGBT fanbase has been credited as helping provide support for the inclusion of openly gay characters in the reboot.

==== Sex appeal ====
When development on a live-action remake of the film was first-announced, LGBT lifestyle magazine Out also described the original series as "one of the gayest ... cartoons of all time", and said the 1987 film "turn[ed] an entire generation of boys at least a little gay". Instinct magazine's Gerald Biggerstaff described the original cartoon as being quite popular with gay men who grew up in the 1980s and 90s, and that for many of them, He-Man "prompted [their] gay awakenings". In 2003, HX Magazine editors compiled a list of must-see television series with attractive male leads, with He-Man as himself and based on his appearance in the 2002 reboot—the only animated character to make the list—being described as the "object of all our childhood wet dreams". British magazine Gay Times compiled a list of cartoon characters their editors were attracted to while growing up; He-Man was at the top of the list, taking note of Dolph Lundgren's depiction of him in the live-action film. In the same publication, actor Andrew Hayden-Smith said 2016 he realized he was gay while playing with his He-Man figure as a child, being attracted to the character's physique—particularly his pecs.

=== Response from Mattel and insiders ===
According to Mark Morse, Mattel's director of global marketing from 2008 to 2017, by 2018, when a "Laughing Prince Adam" action figure was released, the question of He-Man's sexuality and whether a future installment in the franchise should have him be openly gay had not been discussed. In an interview with gay lifestyle online magazine Queerty, Rob David and Tim Sheridan, who work on the show Masters of the Universe: Revelation, discussed the character's homoeroticism and gay fanbase. According to David, who is an executive producer of Revelation and Mattel's Vice President of Creative Content, Mattel is "very comfortable" with He-Man's gay audience and the perception of the character as a gay icon.
