= Power Sword =

Fictional sword from the He-Man: Masters of the Universe franchise

- Masters of the Universe element
- First appearance: He-Man and the Power Sword (1982)
- Created by: Mattel, Filmation
- Genre: Minicomics, Animated television series

In-universe information
- Type: Magical sword
- Owners: He-Man
- Function: Transforms Prince Adam into He-Man and Cringer into Battle Cat
- Traits and abilities: Able to cut through various substances, endows its wielder with vast cosmic powers

The Power Sword, also referred to as the Sword of Power or the Sword of Grayskull, is a fictional sword from Mattel's Masters of the Universe toy line. In the original mini-comics produced with the toyline in 1981, the Power Sword was a mystical object split into two parts, which Skeletor tries to obtain and put together in order to gain control over Castle Grayskull. In these early stories, He-Man uses an axe and a shield, rather than the magical sword.

With the arrival of the 1983 He-Man and the Masters of the Universe animated series, the Power Sword became the means by which Prince Adam transforms into He-Man, and his pet tiger Cringer into Battle Cat. The weapon kept the same basic shape during most of the 1980s, but then it was radically redesigned twice: for the 1990 series The New Adventures of He-Man, and the 2002 remake, He-Man and the Masters of the Universe.

In addition to the action-figure-sized Power Sword packaged with the character, full-size "He-Man Power Swords" were a favorite Christmas gift for decades, allowing children to role-play the barbarian hero. Some of these kid-sized Power Swords have been electronic, making a variety of battle sounds. Power Swords have also been sold as accessories for He-Man Halloween costumes. In the unsuccessful 1989 relaunch of the toy line, the electronic Power Sword reportedly sold better than the entire rest of the toy line put together.

== Early appearances ==
The Power Sword was a late addition in the creation of the Masters of the Universe toy line; in the concept art, He-Man battled with an axe and shield, and a thin, unimpressive sword was wielded by the flamboyant Prince Adam (at that time a separate character, and not He-Man's alternate identity).

When the initial Mattel toy line was introduced in 1982, the He-Man and Skeletor figures each came with half of a plastic sword which could be joined into one "complete" sword, corresponding to the storyline in the included mini-comic. Together, the combined sword was used as a key to open the jawbridge to the Castle Grayskull playset. According to the original storyline, the Goddess (an early name for the Sorceress) had split the sword into two and scattered the pieces, in order to protect the castle and its source of universal power.

The story was told in the He-Man and the Power Sword illustrated mini-comic, which was packaged with the original He-Man action figure. Skeletor's goal in the book is to acquire the other half of the sword hidden inside Castle Grayskull in order to obtain the sword's total power, adding that "the magic fires, created by ancient scientists and sorcerers, will blaze again" once the two halves are joined. The specific purpose of the quest is also made clear: the Power Sword can be used to open a hole in the dimensional wall in order to bring reinforcements from Skeletor's dimension of origin, which would allow Skeletor to conquer Eternia's dimension. Once the two halves of the Power Sword are joined, Skeletor is able to use the sword to command various objects to attack He-Man. However, the spell is broken once the Sorceress splits the Power Sword into two halves again, hiding them and making the Power Sword the only key that can open the castle's Jaw-Bridge when inserted into an enchanted lock.

The next illustrated book, King of Castle Grayskull, reveals where the two halves have been hidden: one at Eternia's "highest point", the other beneath its "hardest rock." Whoever finds them can claim the throne of Castle Grayskull and the "secrets of the universe". The "highest point" turns out to be the top of Stratos's mountain, while the "hardest rock" is the rock where He-Man built his home in the previous book. As expected, the Jawbridge opens once the two halves have been inserted into the lock, but then Skeletor loses the sword again in battle. The book ends with the Spirit of the Castle sending the two halves into another dimension, where Skeletor is not expected to find them easily. The Power Sword is not featured in the last two books of the first series, Battle in the Clouds and The Vengeance of Skeletor.

In How He-Man Mastered the Universe: Toy to Television to the Big Screen, Brian C. Baer writes:

By the time the first minicomic begins, Skeletor has already obtained one of those halves. Though He-Man comes into possession of the other, he is not the one commonly depicted with it in those early stories. Instead, Skeletor is often seen waving it around and using it to cast spells or shoot energy bolts. Before the Power Sword is given more prominence in the Filmation cartoons, He-Man was nearly always drawn with his large, two-bladed battle axe. The multiple versions of the Power Sword are easily explainable by the realities of these first action figures: the swords that most characters were packaged with all looked like that. The tiny swords were made to fit together like in the stories. The thinness of each one's plastic led them to curve from heat and regular play.

== Filmation cartoon ==
When Filmation produced the cartoon He-Man and the Masters of the Universe in 1983, the producers worried that children wouldn't identify with a wild, axe-wielding barbarian character. Based on their experience with The Kid Super Power Hour with Shazam! in 1981, Filmation knew that kids would relate to a vulnerable, child-like figure who could turn super-powerful with a prop and a magic word. For He-Man, the protagonist became Prince Adam, who could use a newly restored Power Sword to turn into the muscle-bound hero.

In the cartoon, the Sorceress of Grayskull gives Prince Adam the Power Sword, which allows him to transform into He-Man, "the Most Powerful Man in the Universe", and his cowardly pet tiger, Cringer, into the fierce and brave Battle Cat. Prince Adam begins his war-cry by holding the Power Sword above his head with his right hand, proclaiming, "By the Power of Grayskull...." whereupon mystical lightning strikes the Power Sword and transforms him; He-Man then seizes the tip of the Power Sword's blade and completes the war-cry, "...I HAVE THE POWER!"

While the Power Sword is the key to unlocking He-Man's strength, it's rarely used in battle; he mostly uses it to cut objects, and deflect energy blasts.

In the episode "The Problem with Power", when He-Man is fooled into thinking that he's inadvertently killed someone, he raises the sword and surrenders the power of Castle Grayskull, transforming back into Prince Adam by proclaiming, "Let the power return!"

Princess Adora/She-Ra, He-Man's twin sister in the cartoon, has a companion Power Sword, called the Sword of Protection, which is identical except that it has a glowing jewel in the hilt. The jewel allows Princess Adora to channel her powers, as her sword is learned to have been a clone of He-Man's sword crafted by the Goddess of Grayskull. She transforms into She-Ra by saying, "For the honor of Grayskull...I am She-Ra!"

Marvel Star Comics' 1986 Masters of the Universe comic book adaptation featured a storyline about an alternate timeline caused by the Power Sword being transported thirty years into the future, and is wielded by a hero named Clamp Champ. The 1989 newspaper comic strip adaptation also featured the Power Sword prominently, used in the iconic transformation in the first strip. A 1989 story, "When You Need an Extra Something", featured a battle between He-Man and Evil-Lyn for possession of the Sword.

== 1987 live action film ==
In the 1987 live action film, Masters of the Universe, the Power Sword is renamed the Sword of Grayskull. In the cartoon, He-Man engaged in actual sword fights very rarely, but the film producers knew that the character was closely associated with the sword, which meant that it should feature prominently in the movie's finale.

== The New Adventures of He-Man ==
The original toy line was cancelled in 1987 after drastically declining sales. Mattel attempted to relaunch the character just two years later, redesigning the character. He-Man was slimmed down to a more realistic musculature, and transported into the distant future for science-fiction adventures on the alien planet Primus. Along with the revamped character, the Power Sword was also redesigned into a more futuristic-looking form, with a green laser blade that could fire bolts of glowing energy.

In 1990, Jetlag Productions produced a new cartoon, The New Adventures of He-Man, to promote the new toy line. In this series, Prince Adam's phrase to transform into He-Man is changed from "By the Power of Grayskull..." to "By the Power of Eternia..." He-Man's sword was a more important element in this version, gaining the ability to fire energy blasts and pulses of magic.

== 2002 television series ==
In the animated 2002 reboot, the origins of the Power Sword and Castle Grayskull are again revised. The castle is revealed to be the former home of the ancient warrior King Grayskull, who resembles He-Man but larger and with longer Viking-like hair and a massive green saber-toothed lion as a steed. The Power Sword is King Grayskull's personal weapon, and after fighting a fatal battle with Hordak, the dying king binds his mystical powers to the weapon. Afterwards his advisers become the Elders who seal the castle, and his wife becomes its guardian, the first Sorceress. Therefore, when Prince Adam holds up the sword and calls out "by the power of Grayskull" he is calling on the energies of King Grayskull himself, rather than those of the namesake castle.

The sword was heavily redesigned for the new cartoon but with a much more complex and mechanized look. When held by Prince Adam, it appears smaller. However, during the transformation sequence, the hilt pivots on an axis and changes shape, taking a new form when it is in He-Man's hands, and is more explicitly shown growing in size in the revised transformation sequence from the second season. In the series finale, it is shown that an alternate mode can be accessed wherein the blade splits in the middle and opens to reveal another emerald blade inside. The sword then appears to be two fangs (the blade) and a snake's tongue (the emerald blade). This mode of the sword was used to battle Serpos, the giant snake deity that was imprisoned in Snake Mountain.

Also in this series, Skeletor possess twin swords that can be combined into one larger sword, a reference to the original concept of the Power Sword(s) from the action figures and minicomics, however this twin sword has no magical properties. According to designers the Four Horsemen, this was due to their original re-sculpts being intended for a continuation of the original storyline in which Skeletor had obtained both halves of the Power Sword (hence the new Skeletor figure's dual blades with clear "good" and "evil" hilt designs), necessitating a new sword to be built by Man-At-Arms and endowed with the properties of the original by the Sorceress. However, Mattel decreed that they wished to reboot the continuity for a new generation of children, and thus the "new" Power Sword design became the "original" version for the new continuity.

== Sword of Protection ==
Sword of Protection
- She-Ra: Princess of Power element
- First appearance: "Origin of the Sorceress"; He-Man and the Masters of the Universe
- Created by: Filmation, Mattel
- Genre: Toy line, Animated television series

In-universe information
- Type: Magical sword
- Owners: She-Ra
- Function: Transforms Princess Adora into She-Ra and Spirit into Swift Wind
- Traits and abilities: Able to cut through various substances, able to change form at She-Ra's command

The Sword of Protection is the weapon wielded by Adora, Prince Adam's twin sister, and is used in her transformation into the heroic She-Ra and Spirit's into Swift Wind. Instead of the war-cry, "By the Power of Grayskull," Adora's transformation is triggered by calling "For the Honor of Grayskull." It is identical in overall design to the Sword of Power, with one exception; the Sword of Protection has a jewel embedded in the hilt.

The jewel is the key to such powers of the Sword of Protection as Adora's transformation; if it is damaged, she loses her ability to transform into She-Ra, as seen in the episode "The Stone in the Sword." The stone, which was created by the Goddess of Grayskull, allows Adora/She-Ra to channel all the powers of Grayskull if needed. She-Ra's sword is discovered to be a direct clone of He-Man's, as the Goddess felt that Adora's destiny would require her to also tap into the powers of Grayskull with her own sword. In addition to being a formidable weapon capable of cutting through most substances or deflecting attacks, the Sword of Protection has the ability to change its shape, a trait not shared by the Sword of Power. She-Ra can change the sword to a variety of weapons or tools through spoken command, varying from a shield or lasso, to a helmet or flaming blade. She-Ra can also use her sword to draw upon the mystical power of the planet Etheria itself, increasing her strength beyond her usual levels.

According to the 2015 DC Comics series He-Man - The Eternity War, the Sword of Protection was forged in case the Sword of Power fell into the wrong hands or the wielder of it became corrupted.

In Netflix's She-Ra and the Princesses of Power, the Sword of Protection is an amalgam of technology and magic. Created by the First Ones, there have been previous wielders of the sword, all who have been able to transform into She-Ra, suggesting its more of a title than individual. The sword is capable of interacting with other pieces of First One's tech, projecting bolts of energy and transforming any animals in a similar manner to Swift Wind's transformation.
