= Skeletor =

Supervillain character

- Masters of the Universe character
- Art print of Skeletor by Alex Ross
- First appearance: He-Man and the Power Sword (1981)
- Created by: Mark Taylor
- Voiced by: Alan Oppenheimer (He-Man and the Masters of the Universe, He-Man and She-Ra: The Secret of the Sword, She-Ra: Princess of Power, He-Man and She-Ra: A Christmas Special, Chip 'n Dale: Rescue Rangers); Keith Scott (Streets commercial); Campbell Lane (The New Adventures of He-Man); Brian Dobson (He-Man and the Masters of the Universe (2002)); Jeff Bennett (Honda commercials); Bill Lobley (GEICO commercial); Mark Hamill / William Shatner (Masters of the Universe); Benjamin Diskin (He-Man and the Masters of the Universe (2021)); Scott Whyte (Call of Duty: Modern Warfare II); Jonah Hundert (Masters of the Universe: Tales From Eternia)
- Portrayed by: Frank Langella (1987 film); Jared Leto (2026 film)

In-universe information
- Full name: Keldor
- Species: Demon / Gar-human hybrid
- Titles: Evil Lord of Destruction; Overlord of Evil
- Affiliation: Evil Warriors
- Family: King Miro (father); Saryn (mother); King Randor (half-brother)
- Relatives: Queen Marlena (sister-in-law); Prince Adam / He-Man (nephew); Princess Adora / She-Ra (niece)

Skeletor (/ˈskɛlətɔːr/) is a supervillain and the main antagonist of the Masters of the Universe media franchise created by Mattel. The character first appeared in the minicomic He-Man and the Power Sword (1981), which was included with the original Masters of the Universe action figures. Skeletor is usually depicted as a skull-faced, blue-skinned sorcerer who serves as the archenemy of He-Man. As the self-proclaimed "Evil Lord of Destruction", Skeletor leads his Evil Warriors from his lair on Snake Mountain in his obsessive quest to unlock the secrets of Castle Grayskull, which he believes will give him the power to conquer the planet Eternia and the entire universe.

Although Skeletor was originally described as a demonic warlord from another dimension, later stories provided his origin as Keldor, the former apprentice of Hordak and the older half-brother of He-Man's father, King Randor. Denied rulership of Eternia for being half-demon, Keldor attempted to seize the throne by force but his face was damaged by acid during a confrontation with Randor; the resulting disfigurement drove him insane and led to his transformation into Skeletor.

Skeletor has appeared in various forms of media and been featured in almost every adaptation of the Masters of the Universe franchise, including films and television series. In live-action, the character has been portrayed by Frank Langella in the 1987 film, and Jared Leto in the 2026 film. Alan Oppenheimer, Brian Dobson, Mark Hamill, and Benjamin Diskin, among others, have voiced the character in animation.

== Appearances ==
=== Pre-Filmation minicomics ("savage Eternia") ===
Skeletor as originally depicted in the minicomic He-Man and the Power Sword (1981). Art by Alfredo Alcala.

The first minicomics that accompanied the 1981–1983 line of Masters of the Universe toys presented the earliest version of continuity, which had several differences from the continuity of the Filmation cartoon and the minicomics that complemented it.

Skeletor was originally an inhabitant of another dimension until he was transported to Eternia during "The Great Wars" when a hole opened in the dimensional wall, and seeks to reopen the rift so that his race can invade and conquer Eternia. To do so, he seeks the powers of Castle Grayskull, a fortress in Eternia said to contain great powers. Along the way, Skeletor becomes smitten with the Goddess (a prototype for Teela), and seeks to make her his bride to help him in his conquest plans.

=== Filmation He-Man and the Masters of the Universe (1983) ===
Skeletor in the Filmation animated series

In the 1980s series, Skeletor is a former pupil of Hordak, high-ranking commander of the Evil Horde. When Hordak invaded Eternia and kidnapped the baby Princess Adora from the palace, Man-At-Arms and the Royal Guard captured his apprentice, Skeletor, and forced him to divulge the whereabouts of his master, who had retreated to his base of operations, Snake Mountain. After being cornered, Hordak escaped to Etheria with Adora through a dimensional portal. Skeletor, left behind by Hordak, set about raising an army of minions of his own, becoming ruler of Snake Mountain. He seeks to conquer the fortress of Castle Grayskull, from which He-Man draws his powers, and conquer Eternia and the universe. His other goal is to take revenge on Hordak and overthrow Horde Prime in his bid to conquer the universe. Despite this, his plans are often foiled by He-Man or She-Ra, as well as the incompetence of his minions and of himself.

In addition to the main series, he appeared in the spin-off series She-Ra: Princess of Power, the theatrical film He-Man and She-Ra: The Secret of the Sword, and the primetime Christmas special He-Man and She-Ra: A Christmas Special. In these appearances, he is voiced by Alan Oppenheimer.

=== Post-Filmation series minicomics ===
In the 1986 minicomic "The Search for Keldor", Skeletor is implied to be Keldor, King Randor's long-lost brother, who had disappeared years earlier after trying to unlock magical powers, which transported him to another dimension. In order to uncover what happened to Keldor, Randor and the Sorceress attempt to look through a space-time rift that opens once a year.

However, because the original toyline ended before the story could be resolved, this has not been confirmed. Steven Grant, the writer-for-hire of the minicomic, stated in a he-man.org interview that "As far as I remember, Keldor was Skeletor… But, I don't think that was ever going to be revealed… I seem to remember it as one of those things Mattel came up with out of the blue… Slur Keldor and you end up with Skeletor… His back-story wasn't really worked out. Some sort of evil cosmic energies altered him. I think they were going for a Darth Vader thing, but it was a tack-on… The main idea was that if they found out Skeletor was Keldor, they'd be able to find out what had changed him and might find some way to reverse it."

In the Masters of the Universe Classics toyline, he is Randor's half-brother, whose mother was a member of the Gar race, and was ousted from the royal castle due to his Gar heritage. While roaming Eternia in search of knowledge, he learned the Dark Arts from Hordak and sought to unite Eternia by ruling it himself. After battling Randor and losing, he turned to his mentor, Hordak, to survive and was merged with an entity known as the Demo-Man, becoming Skeletor.

=== Masters of the Universe (1987 film) ===
Frank Langella as Skeletor in the 1987 film

Skeletor appears in the 1987 live-action Masters of the Universe film, portrayed by Frank Langella. This version is notably darker and more competent than his preceding Filmation counterpart. Skeletor conquers Eternia, captures Castle Grayskull, and absorbs the power of the Great Eye to transform into a golden demonic god, but He-Man throws him off a cliff into a vat. In a post-credits scene, Skeletor emerges from the vat and proclaims that he will return. To prepare for the role, Langella watched the Filmation series and asked his children questions about Skeletor as they were fans of the franchise. Langella's performance is highly regarded by fans and critics as being the high point of the film, and Langella himself has regarded Skeletor as one of his favorite roles.

=== The New Adventures of He-Man (1990) ===
Skeletor in his "Disks of Doom" form in The New Adventures of He-Man

In the series, Skeletor (voiced by Campbell Lane) tricks the Galactic Guardians, Hydron and Flipshot, into believing that he is the force of good they need to save their home planet, Primus, when they come looking for He-Man. Unable to decide who is good and who is evil, Skeletor and He-Man are transported to the futuristic planet Primus, where Skeletor reveals his true nature to the Primans as the Mutants attack. Skeletor and the leader of the mutants, Flogg, come to an agreement: Skeletor will help Flogg conquer Primus in exchange for Flogg's help in destroying He-Man. One of Flogg's conditions is that he remain in charge of the mutants. Skeletor agrees, and is able to manipulate and control Flogg from behind the scenes, while making himself a force to be reckoned with among Primans and Mutants alike.

In the episode "Sword and Staff", Skeletor absorbs the power of a crystal he finds on Moon Nordor, which grants him power and changes changing his appearance to one based on the "Disks of Doom Skeletor" toy. Throughout the series, Skeletor concocts various schemes to destroy He-Man and conquer Primus.

Skeletor's portrayal in the series differs from the Filmation cartoon, as he possesses a sarcastic sense of humor and takes his failures better. He also has genuine relationships with others, including Crita and the mutants and his pet, Grr, and is more competent and threatening.

The first toys for the "New Adventures" line gave a different explanation for how He-Man and Skeletor ended up in the future and how he gained his cybernetics through a mini-comic included with various figures. In the minicomic, Skeletor learned that He-Man and Prince Adam were the same, only for Adam to become He-Man permanently. The energy output caused by this transformation led him to use cybernetics to heal his wounds.

=== He-Man and the Masters of the Universe (2002) ===
Skeletor in the 2002 animated series

In the series, Skeletor (voiced by Brian Dobson) serves as the main antagonist of the first season and, along with Kobra Khan and Rattlor, one of three secondary antagonists of the second season. Skeletor was formerly the warlord Keldor, who trained in the dark arts and was taught the ways of black magic after summoning Hordak, who was trapped in the dark dimension of Despondos. When he and his forces attacked the Hall of Wisdom, he fought Randor, but was mortally injured after being splashed in the face with acid. As Kronis retreated, Evil-Lyn took Keldor to Hordak's sanctuary, where Keldor summoned Hordak to save his life. Keldor agreed to pay the price Hordak wished for his own life, and Hordak transformed him into his current form as Skeletor.

Due to being trapped in the Dark Hemisphere by the Mystic Wall, Skeletor designed a machine to destroy it. However, it needed the Corodite Crystal as a power source; after Mer-Man retrieved it, Skeletor destroyed the Mystic Wall and returned to menacing Eternia.

Unlike previous portrayals, Skeletor is initially not concerned with Castle Grayskull until a giant fish-monster swallowes the remnants of the Corodite Crystal and he begins to seek power. In the first-season finale, Skeletor directly attacks with his Council of Evil until King Hiss and the Snake Men are freed from the Void. King Hiss imprisons him in the Void and has him devoured by a giant snake, but Skeletor escapes after the Masters defeat Hiss.

Despite owing his life to Hordak, Skeletor destroys Hordak's sanctuary to prevent him from returning, as he did not want to hold up his end of the bargain and free Hordak from Despondos due to wanting Eternia for himself. At the end of the second season, King Hiss revives Serpos, the Serpent God, who had been transformed into Snake Mountain by the Elders, but it is defeated and returned to its Snake Mountain form.

In the series, Skeletor is portrayed as being cruel to his followers and ruling them through fear, blaming them for their defeats at the hands of the Masters. He is also shown power-hungry and harbors hatred towards King Randor for his part in destroying his face and making him what he is now, also blaming Evil-Lyn for saving him. This gradually shifts towards hatred against He-Man for opposing him.

As with all Mike Young Productions series' characters, Skeletor's appearance is based on his figure from the Four Horsemen-designed toyline. Skeletor is the character that received perhaps the least-extensive redesign from his original toy/cartoon version. However, when this new design was then translated into animated form, MYP's artists usually gave him a voluminous cape, which neither the new toy or the original incarnation of the character wore. When a convention-exclusive figure of Keldor was made using the existing Skeletor body, a removable cloth cape was included. As the figure came with three swappable heads, including his Keldor face; his burning, acid-splashed visage, and his final Skeletor head, this figure could be configured into a "show-accurate" caped Skeletor.

According to a he-man.org interview with one of the series producers, Keldor is Randor's half-brother. If a third season had been produced, it would have seen Skeletor and He-Man dealing with the Horde invasion and Hordak, who Skeletor would have defeated. It also would have shown Skeletor's part in kidnapping of She-Ra and sending her to Hordak to be raised.

=== He-Man and the Masters of the Universe (2012) ===
In the comics published by DC Comics, Skeletor works to prevent Adam from remembering his true identity.

Following Beast Man's failure, he learns that their attempt to wipe his memory did not erase his instinctive understanding of battle. Though he shows Beast Man mercy, he reminds them of their goal; Trap Jaw and his riders later ambush Adam in the desert.

While reflecting on how he had worked so hard to capture Adam's sword, which he thought was the source of He-Man's power but now knows is a conduit to the powers of Castle Grayskull, he has a catatonic Sorceress over for dinner and attempts to learn from her how to access Castle Grayskull's powers. When Adam and Teela are on a ship at sea, Skeletor sends word to Mer-Man to dispose of "Prince" Adam.

Annoyed at the fact that his allies have not killed Adam, he considers taking action, but is unable to leave Castle Grayskull. He then worries that the Sorceress is the key to unlocking the castle's power.

After Evil-Lyn reports to him about the misplacement of her prisoners Adam and Teela and points out that the bird Zoar allowed Adam to escape, Skeletor realizes that the Sorceress of Grayskull has been undermining him. He confronts her in her cell and demands to know where in his mind she was hiding. After she reveals that she hid in plain sight within a pleasant memory that he rarely visits, he kills her and resolves to get Grayskull's power himself.

At Castle Grayskull, after Beast Man informs him that He-Man has regained his memories and will soon attack the castle, they prepare for his arrival. During the battle, Skeletor is revealed to have survived the fall into the chasm and is faced with the head that he threw out of the castle, who is revealed to be a minion that encourages him to not accept defeat. The ending reveals that an unknown enemy that wishes Skeletor dead, but is not yet prepared to see it happen, has been manipulating him.

=== Masters of the Universe: Revelation ===
After discovering that Castle Grayskull is a shell that serves to guard the Orb of Power, Skeletor uses the Shaping Staff to disguise himself as Spikor and Evil-Lyn as Clawful, who pretends to have been captured by He-Man, but is in reality the robot Faker. This deception dupes the Sorceress long enough for the Evil Warriors to enter and attack Grayskull.

After gaining access to the heart of Grayskull, Skeletor defeats Moss Man and manipulates He-Man into stabbing him with his sword to strike and open the Orb of Power, releasing the magic power that created Eternia and the universe. The Sorceress freezes time to meet with He-Man and Teela and Skeletor attempts to grab the two halves of the sword. However, he and Adam are destroyed in the ensuing explosion, leaving behind his Havoc Staff.

Part of Skeletor's essence survives and comes to dwell in Evil-Lyn's wand-staff. Teela, accompanied by Evil-Lyn and Beast Man, goes on a quest to recover the halves of the Sword of Power and reforge them into one. In the Eternian afterlife, Preternia, they reunite with Adam, who gave up his everlasting reward to return to the land of the living and restore magic to the universe with the power of Grayskull. When magic returns, Skeletor reforms and stabs Adam in the back before taking the Sword of Power and the power of Grayskull, becoming Skelegod.

=== He-Man and the Masters of the Universe (2021) ===
Skeletor appears in He-Man and the Masters of the Universe (2021), voiced by Benjamin Diskin. This version is a human and the younger brother of King Randor. Ten years prior to the events of the series, Keldor kidnapped Adam and attempted to gain the power of the Havoc Staff before being cursed by its energy and transformed into a skeleton.

After reuniting with Adam in the present, Skeletor battles him and attempts to remake the universe in his image before Adam cleanses him of Havoc and reverts him to his human form. Despite this, Beast-Man retrieves the Havoc Staff from the severed arm of Skeletor's former giant form.

=== Masters of the Universe (2026 film) ===
Jared Leto as Skeletor in the 2026 film

Skeletor appears in the 2026 live-action Masters of the Universe film, portrayed by Jared Leto. This version successfully overthrows King Randor and rules over Eternia for fifteen years until Randor's son, Prince Adam, returns with the Power Sword of Castle Grayskull. Skeletor has his forces capture Adam but finds that he is unable to access the Sword's powers, and is ultimately destroyed when Adam uses the Sword to transform into Eternia's prophesied champion during the final battle at Grayskull. In a post-credits scene, Skeletor's skull is retrieved by his counselor Evil-Lyn, and his laughter is heard.

== Powers and abilities ==
Skeletor is a powerful warlock with a mastery of sorcery and dark magic, possessing abilities including energy projection, telepathy, telekinesis, teleportation, and spell and illusion casting. His primary weapon is a sceptre called the Havoc Staff which further amplifies his magical powers. Skeletor has also been shown to wield swords, such as in early minicomics, where he possesses one half of the Power Sword. He is also highly intelligent and has exhibited considerable skill in science and machinery.

== Animals ==
Despite being evil, Skeletor has an affinity for animals. He has had various animal companions, including Panthor as well as Grr in The New Adventures of He-Man.

In He-Man and She-Ra: A Christmas Special, Skeletor befriends Relay, a partly-robotic dog and member of the Manchines. After Relay is shot down by Hordak, Skeletor initially abandons Relay before deciding to bring him with him.

== In other media ==
- Skeletor appeared in various commercials, including: a 1985 Australian Streets commercial for He-Man branded ice cream, where he is voiced by Keith Scott; a series of commercials for Honda, where he is voiced by Jeff Bennett; a March 2017 commercial for Moneysupermarket.com; and a September 2017 GEICO commercial, where he is voiced by Bill Lobley.
- Skeletor appears in DC Comics, where he became Skeletor after being cursed by his father.
- Skeletor makes a cameo appearance alongside He-Man in Chip 'n Dale: Rescue Rangers, with Alan Oppenheimer reprising his role.

== Legacy ==
Skeletor was the inspiration for the 2019 self-help book What Would Skeletor Do? Diabolical Ways to Master the Universe by Robb Pearlman.

== See also ==
- Thulsa Doom, an antediluvian villainous sorcerer bearing a skull face, nemesis of Kull of Atlantis, created by author Robert E. Howard in the 1928 story "The Cat and the Skull"
- Szkieletor, a structure in Kraków, Poland, named after the Polish version of Skeletor's name
- Lich
- Ōgon Bat
