= Castle Grayskull =

Masters of the Universe castle

- Masters of the Universe location
- Packaging art of the 1982 Castle Grayskull playset
- Created by: Donald F. Glut; Roger Sweet

In-universe information
- Type: Castle
- Locations: Throne Room; Travel Corridor Chamber; Elevator; Jawbridge; Crystal Chamber; Dungeon; Monitor Room; Armory
- Characters: He-Man; She-Ra; King Grayskull; Sorceress of Castle Grayskull

Castle Grayskull is a castle that forms a central location in the Masters of the Universe media franchise and also appears in the 1987 and 2026 live action film adaptations. The concept is credited to Donald F. Glut. The toy set was invented by Roger Sweet. Castle Grayskull was a "major feature of Mattel's line", and was "one of the most famous playsets of all time".

In the storyline of the franchise, it is the target of numerous attacks by Skeletor, Hordak and the Snake Men, all of whom believe that the secrets inside will allow them to conquer Eternia and the entire universe, and become the titular Masters of the Universe. Castle Grayskull plays a key role in the transformations of both He-Man and his twin sister She-Ra in the 1983–1985 He-Man and the Masters of the Universe series, and in its 1985–1987 spinoff/sister series She-Ra: Princess of Power.

== Toyline ==
Castle Grayskull was conceived as the central location for the battle between the forces of good and evil. The original playset was released in 1982, and all other depictions of the castle originate from it. It is a large hollow green castle, consisting of two halves connected by a hinge. The toy is designed to open for play and close for storage. A carrying handle is molded into the top of the castle. A large skull decorates the front, with a hinged "Jawbridge" allowing access to the interior, through the "mouth" opening. The interior has a throne room, elevator, and a trap door. Multiple accessories are also included – a ladder, removable flag pole, turret cannon, weapons rack with nine weapons, and a "battle trainer" device.

When the initial Mattel toy line was introduced in 1982, the He-Man and Skeletor figures each came with half of a plastic sword which could be joined into one "complete" sword, corresponding to the storyline in the included mini-comic. Together, the combined sword was used as a key to open the jawbridge to the Castle Grayskull playset. According to the original storyline, the Sorceress (as she is called in the very first minicomic "He-Man and the Powersword") had split the sword into two and scattered the pieces, in order to protect the castle and its source of universal power.

The toy set was the centerpiece of the toy line, and sold more than 3.5 million units.

An early concept sketch by Mark Taylor featured "the Dwell of Souls", an idea that evolved into Castle Grayskull; it featured a skull-shaped entrance. The original packaging art by Rudy Obrero showed Skeletor inside the jaw bridge; which was done because Mr. Obrero had not been given a storyline at that point and he thought to himself that it might be Skeletor's base.

The original concept art and prototype show a large swamp surrounding the castle, which was going to be printed on a playmat that would be positioned beneath the playset. This moat playmat was not included with the finished toy, in order to keep costs down.

=== Further releases ===
Castle Grayskull was made as a playset for both the 1980s and 2002 Masters of the Universe toy lines. The 1980s incarnation was one of the more popular Christmas presents for pre-adolescent boys in the 1980s. The castle was user-friendly, possessing many settings and functions suitable for the 5" action figures it was built to complement.

Castle Grayskull was released by Mattel for inclusion in their Masters of the Universe Classics action figure line (mid to late November 2013), and a new character, named Castle Grayskullman, described as the "Heroic Embodiment of Castle Grayskull" was created by Daniel Benedict and was the winner of the 30th Anniversary "Create-A-Character" Contest. The figure of Castle Grayskullman was released in November 2012.

== Storyline ==
=== Origins ===
The origin of Castle Grayskull was related in the read-along book "Castle Grayskull," published by Kid Stuff, 1983, as once being the beautiful "Hall of Wisdom," the "center of Eternian culture and a storehouse of all knowledge of the universe." The Hall was the meeting place of the Council of Elders. One day, the elders saw a vision of a beautiful woman dressed in snake armor who warned of future danger and also the coming of He-Man. The Elders concentrated all of their power into a magical orb. The Elders then magically transformed the Hall of Wisdom into Castle Grayskull in order to frighten away intruders and protect the orb. This was to have all taken place several centuries before the coming of He-Man. The Castle was then largely forgotten until Man-At-Arms eventually led Prince Adam to Castle Grayskull, where Prince Adam became He-Man using the Sword of Power.

=== Filmation series (1983) ===
In the original television series, Castle Grayskull is a legendary/mythical location situated on a pedestal of bones jutting out of an abyss in a barren plain just on the edge of the Evergreen Forest. It serves as home to the Sorceress and to the mysterious and rarely seen Spirit of Grayskull, as well as a place of refuge for He-Man and all those considered his friends. Its origins are unknown except for the fact that it was constructed to protect an unspecified source of power from those who would misuse it. It is a frequent target for the forces of evil.

Although it is mostly viewed from the outside, there are a few notable internal locations: the Throne Room; Main Chamber (including the Walkway of the Elders); the Hall of He-Man; the Portal Chamber (in the skull top); a laboratory (basement); Mirror Room (basement); the Sorceress' den (where she studies and practices spells; in the right tower); and, the Sorceress' bed-chamber. In the episode "Double Trouble", an evil doppelganger of He-Man's friend Kol Darr also comes across the chamber that houses the Secrets of Castle Grayskull. It is a room with two doors, between which sits the Guardian, one of which houses the secrets, the other one is the only destruction.

The castle is surrounded by a bottomless abyss, which doubles as a moat in at least one episode, and a Jawbridge (a drawbridge formed by the lower jaw of the castle's "mouth") is used to come across it. When Prince Adam transforms into He-Man, sparks shoot up from the abyss towards He-Man's sword. This phenomenon is seen in the episode "Into the Abyss", when Teela falls into the abyss and witnesses this spectacle from a unique vantage point. In the same episode, He-Man states that the abyss actually leads to the center of Eternia.

There are a number of magical doors inside the castle, most of them in the Portal Chamber, that serve as portals to various locations on Eternia, including Snake Mountain, and at least one that leads to Etheria. The castle also plays a key role in and is consistently featured in She-Ra's transformation, in the spinoff series She-Ra: Princess of Power.

=== Live action movie (1987) ===
In the live-action movie, Castle Grayskull is finally captured by Skeletor's forces. The first image of it seen is of its interior as Skeletor, victorious at last, makes the long march across the castle's Throne Room. The throne resides in the posterior section of the room just beyond the section's seemingly incomplete marble foundation which rests atop pillars and framework that extend from a deep abyss. This foundation is formed in such a way that there are four large holes of sizes that altogether occupy most of the floor's area leaving a few wide catwalk walkways. The large posterior section of the room is lined with several tall statues of elders along each side whereas the much thinner, less tall, anterior section of the room is an open hallway lined with columns along each side. Near the throne, Skeletor has trapped the Sorceress within an energy field, which, little by little, transfers her power to him. The castle serves as Skeletor's main base of operations throughout the movie. According to the film, it houses a giant circular portal called "the Great Eye of the Galaxy", which only opens when Eternia's moon reaches its zenith, granting whoever stands before it god-like power. It is never explicitly stated, though visuals strongly indicate, that for this to happen the Sword of Grayskull must be inserted into a small column near the portal. The opening narration implies that Castle Grayskull itself is at the center of the universe.

In the film, the exterior of Castle Grayskull was designed by production designer William Stout. It was presented as a matte painting, and only appeared once, to reduce the cost of sets and models.

=== Reboot (2002) ===
The castle's purpose and history are significantly changed in the 2002 series, as are the variety of locations shown in the castle. For the new series, Hall of Wisdom was an entirely separate location from Castle Grayskull, though built later than Grayskull and existing at the same time. The most significant of the expansions made is the addition of a large Crystal Chamber, accessible only by a secret "door" in the floor of a secluded chamber (which existed already in the vintage books by Golden). Within this chamber is the Orb of Power, within which lies the combined powers of the Elders. Prior to its bestowal upon Prince Adam, the Sword of Power was also stored in the depths of the Crystal Chamber. Other locations within the castle include the Throne Room (trophy room); a massive library (blue room); a room that houses an enormous, mystical mirror used to view both the past and present; an underground colosseum; a secret chamber devoted to King Grayskull; the area behind the eye sockets of the castle's facade; and, numerous corridors that are draped in illusions to confound invaders.

It is revealed that Castle Grayskull was once home to King Grayskull, an ancestor of Prince Adam, who died defending his kingdom and Eternia as a whole from Hordak. Upon his death, King Grayskull transferred his power into his sword that now forms the basis of He-Man's power. His wife Veena became the first Sorceress, and his advisers became the Council of Elders. He also had an enormous green lion as a mount, bearing the same armor as Battle Cat, and is presumably where Battle Cat gains his powers.

Once made of white marble, and at the center of King Grayskull's bustling kingdom, the castle fell into a state of disrepair following a devastating battle with the forces of Hordak. Over countless years, the castle was almost entirely forgotten by the populace. Its true purpose, and the secrets within, are now known to only a very select few. Like the Filmation version, it is surrounded by a seemingly bottomless abyss and is backed by a sheer cliff. This abyss was revealed to have been created during the final confrontation between King Grayskull and Hordak.

== Influences ==
A 1984 New York Times article noted He-Man had become the highest-rated children's television program in America. It noted how children would often mimic the show, shouting with plastic swords held aloft, "By the power of Grayskull, I have the power!" "That's how you can tell adults with children these days, if they know what that means", said one commentator.

- In the film Hot Fuzz, police officer Danny Butterman (played by Nick Frost) says "By the power of Grayskull!" when shown the stockpile of weapons collected by a local farmer. This line is later repeated by Sgt. Nicholas Angel, after seeing Danny's collection of action movie DVDs.
- German epic death metal band Grailknights released the album Return to Castle Grailskull, picturing them on the album cover in front of "Castle Grailskull" (resembling the sculpt used in the 2002 MOTU toyline). In the first video clip from that album, "Moonlit Masquerade", they perform on a CGI-generated Castle Grayskull. The band's live shows include characters who resemble Skeletor and other MOTU figures.
- The 23rd Regiment Armory in Brooklyn, because of its Romanesque Revival design style and castle appearance since the first run of the He-Man animated series, has been given the nickname "Castle GraySkull".
- The 2022 Super Bowl commercial titled "Dream House with Anna Kendrick and Barbie", for a mortgage company, shows a Barbie doll character caught in a super competitive real estate market, who is resigned to buying a fixer-upper: Castle Grayskull.
