= Roger Sweet =

American toy designer (1935–2026)

- Sweet in 2026
- Born: April 4, 1935; Ohio, U.S.
- Died: April 28, 2026 (aged 91)
- Education: Miami University; Institute of Design at Illinois Tech
- Occupations: Toy designer; businessman
- Known for: Creator of He-Man

Roger Sweet (April 4, 1935 – April 28, 2026) was an American toy designer, known for his work as the lead designer in Mattel's Preliminary Design Department, which created He-Man and the Masters of the Universe toy line in 1982.

== Early life and career ==
Roger Sweet was born in Ohio in 1935 and grew up in Akron, Ohio. He graduated from Miami University in Oxford, Ohio, and the Institute of Design at the Illinois Institute of Technology. Sweet served as a lead designer at Mattel throughout much of the 1970s and 1980s and worked extensively on the Masters of the Universe toy line. Before working for Mattel, Sweet held design positions with Walter Dorwin Teague Associates, an industrial design firm, and other design companies. He worked on the accounts of such companies as Boeing, Rubbermaid, Hoover, and Procter & Gamble, and on such products as the interior of the Boeing 747 jumbo jet airliner, and the Downy and Scope packages.

== Origin of the Masters of the Universe franchise ==
In 1976, Mattel's CEO Ray Wagner declined a request to produce a toyline of action figures based on the characters from the George Lucas film Star Wars. (Note: The rights to manufacture the Star Wars toyline were later acquired by Hasbro.) Amid the commercial success of the film trilogy and its related merchandise, Mattel attempted to launch several unsuccessful toylines, none of which captured the public's imagination or made a significant dent in the toy market. These included Kid Gallant, a medieval knight; Robin and the Space Hoods, a sci-fi figure; and the daredevil Kenny Dewitt (pronounced "Can He Do It?").

Sweet was a lead designer for Mattel's Preliminary Design Department throughout much of the 1970s and 1980s. According to his book Mastering the Universe: He-Man and the Rise and Fall of a Billion-Dollar Idea, Sweet made He-Man with the idea that the character's simplicity would make it effective: He explained to Mattel's marketers that "this was a powerful figure that could be taken anywhere and dropped into any context because he had a generic name: He-Man!" (Note: Authorship of the He-Man character has been subject to debate; another designer, Mark Taylor, has also taken credit for creation of the superhero.)

== Personal life and death ==
Sweet moved to Lake Stevens, Washington, with his wife Marlene in 1992 after their retirement from Mattel. He was diagnosed with follicular non-Hodgkin lymphoma in 1999 and underwent treatment. Sweet was moved to a memory care facility to treat his dementia; a GoFundMe campaign was started by his wife in early 2026 to pay for his treatment.

Sweet died at the facility on April 28, 2026, at the age of 91.
