= List of She-Ra: Princess of Power and She-Ra and the Princesses of Power characters =

Group of fictional characters

This is a list of characters that appear in She-Ra: Princess of Power and She-Ra and the Princesses of Power.

== Overview ==
Character	Portrayed by	She-Ra: Princess of Power				She-Ra and the Princesses of Power					
Character	Portrayed by	He-Man and She-Ra: The Secret of the Sword	Season 1	He-Man & She-Ra: A Christmas Special	Season 2	Season 1	Season 2	Season 3	Season 4	Season 5	Shorts
Character	Portrayed by	The Rebellion									
She-Ra Princess Adora	Melendy Britt Aimee Carrero LaLa Nestor (young)	Main	Main	Main	Main	Main	Main	Main	Main	Main	Main
Swift Wind Spirit / Horsey	Lou Scheimer Adam Ray	Main	Main	Main	Main	Main	Main	Guest	Recurring	Main	Main
Bow	George DiCenzo Marcus Scribner	Main	Main	Guest	Main	Main	Main	Main	Main	Main	Main
Glimmer Queen of Bright Moon	Linda Gary Karen Fukuhara	Main	Main	Guest	Main	Main	Main	Main	Main	Main	Main
Angella Queen of Bright Moon	Erika Scheimer Reshma Shetty	Main	Main	Guest	Main	Main	Main	Main	Guest	Pictured	Guest
Shadow Weaver Light Spinner	Linda Gary Lorraine Toussaint	Main	Main		Main	Main	Main	Main	Main	Main	
He-Man Prince Adam	John Erwin	Main	Recurring	Main	Guest						
Teela-Na Sorceress of Castle Grayskull	Linda Gary	Main	Recurring		Guest						
Skeletor	Alan Oppenheimer	Main	Recurring	Main	Guest						
Madame Razz	Linda Gary Grey Griffin	Main	Main	Guest	Main	Guest		Guest	Guest	Guest	
Kowl	Lou Scheimer	Main	Main	Guest	Main						
Cringer Battle Cat	Alan Oppenheimer	Main	Guest	Guest	Guest						
Loo-Kee	Erika Scheimer		Main	Main	Main	Guest					
Broom	Lou Scheimer	Guest	Main	Guest	Main	Silent			Silent		
Princess Mermista	Melendy Britt Vella Lovell		Guest	Main	Recurring	Recurring	Recurring	Recurring	Main	Main	Recurring
Peekablue	Erika Scheimer John Lavelle		Guest	Main	Guest		Guest			Double Trouble	
Duncan Man-At-Arms	Alan Oppenheimer	Guest		Main	Guest						
King Randor	Lou Scheimer	Guest		Main	Guest						
Queen Marlena	Linda Gary	Guest		Main	Guest						
Orko	Lou Scheimer		Guest	Main	Guest						
Light Hope	Lou Scheimer Morla Gorrondona		Recurring		Recurring	Main	Main	Main	Main	Guest	Guest
Huntara	Erika Scheimer Geena Davis		Guest					Main	Guest	Guest	
Princess Perfuma	Erika Scheimer Genesis Rodriguez		Guest	Guest	Guest	Recurring	Recurring	Recurring	Main	Main	Recurring
Princess Frosta	Erika Scheimer Merit Leighton		Recurring	Guest	Recurring	Recurring	Recurring	Recurring	Main	Main	Recurring
She-Ra Princess Mara	Zehra Fazal					Guest	Guest	Guest	Main	Guest	
Double Trouble	Jacob Tobia								Main	Guest	
Sea Hawk	George DiCenzo Jordan Fisher		Recurring	Guest	Guest	Recurring	Recurring	Recurring	Recurring	Main	Guest
Castaspella	Melendy Britt Sandra Oh		Recurring	Guest	Guest	Recurring	Recurring	Recurring	Guest	Main	
King Micah	George DiCenzo Daniel Dae Kim Taylor Gray (young)		Guest				Guest	Guest	Recurring	Main	
Netossa	Diane Pershing Krystal Joy Brown				Guest	Guest			Guest	Main	
Spinnerella	Diane Pershing ND Stevenson				Guest	Guest			Guest	Main	
Wrong Hordak	Keston John									Main	
Teela	Linda Gary	Guest		Guest							
Flutterina	Erika Scheimer Amanda C. Miller		Guest	Guest	Guest		Guest	Guest	Double Trouble		
Snout Spout	Lou Scheimer		Guest	Guest	Guest		Guest				
Sweet Bee	Linda Gary				Guest		Guest				
The Horde
Catra	Melendy Britt AJ Michalka Juliet Donenfeld (young)	Main	Main	Main	Main	Main	Main	Main	Main	Main	Main
Hordak	George DiCenzo Keston John	Main	Main	Main	Main	Main	Main	Main	Main	Main	Silent
Imp	Erika Scheimer	Guest	Main		Recurring	Recurring	Recurring	Main	Recurring	Silent	
Grizzlor	Lou Scheimer Keston John	Guest	Main		Main	Guest					
Leech	Lou Scheimer	Guest	Main		Main						
Mantenna	Lou Scheimer	Guest	Main		Main						
Horde Prime	Lou Scheimer Keston John		Recurring	Main	Recurring			Guest	Guest	Main	
Scorpia	Linda Gary Lauren Ash	Guest	Recurring		Recurring	Main	Main	Main	Main	Main	Recurring
Entrapta	Linda Gary Christine Woods				Recurring	Main	Main	Main	Main	Main	Recurring
Lohni/Lonnie	Linda Gary Dana Davis		Guest			Recurring	Recurring	Recurring	Main	Silent	Guest
Kyle	Antony Del Rio					Recurring	Recurring	Recurring	Main	Silent	Silent
Rogelio	Character is Silent					Recurring	Recurring	Recurring	Main	Silent	Silent
Octavia	Melendy Britt Amy Landecker		Guest		Guest	Guest		Guest	Guest	Silent	Silent

== The Rebellion ==
The Great Rebellion is a faction on Etheria that fights the occupation of Etheria by the Horde. While Bright Moon is their capital, the Whispering Woods serves as their base of operation. Among its members are:

=== Key Members ===
==== She-Ra / Princess Adora ====
She-Ra is introduced in the animated film The Secret of the Sword as Force Captain Adora, who was an agent of the Evil Horde that rules the planet Etheria. She discovers that she is the long-lost twin sister of Prince Adam (aka He-Man) and the princess of Eternia, having been stolen by the Horde's leader, Hordak, as a baby. She is granted the Sword of Protection, which parallels He-Man's Sword of Power, gaining the power to transform into She-Ra.

In the 2018 series, a teenaged Adora is portrayed as the current holder of the She-Ra title with her identity public knowledge compared to the 1985 series. She gets together with Catra in the series finale.

She-Ra and Princess Adora are voiced by Melendy Britt in the 1980s series and by Aimee Carrero in the 2018 series.

==== Swift Wind / Spirit ====
Spirit is the horse of Adora, serving as her steed Swift Wind. Noble and brave, he has a mate named Starwind and they have a young colt. His transformation gives him the appearance of a winged unicorn with the ability of speech. She-Ra occasionally calls him Swifty when referring to his winged unicorn form.

In the 2018 series, Swift Wind was a regular horse before She-Ra's magic accidentally transformed him into a winged unicorn and gave him the capability of speech. Swift Wind pursues his own political agenda of liberating Etheria's horses.

Spirit / Swift Wind are voiced by Lou Scheimer in the 1980s series and by Adam Ray in the 2018 series.

==== Bow ====
Bow is an archer who is one of the original Rebels. Bow often has to disguise himself when leaving The Whispering Woods, to prevent the Horde from identifying him. A cultured gentleman, Bow nevertheless is plagued by personal insecurities. He, like Glimmer, is a rather impetuous member of the Rebellion. He is far too eager to rush into battle with the Horde, which more often than not gets him captured, leading to She-Ra rescuing him. He develops a crush on She-Ra, whose true identity he does not know. Bow appears to have known Rebellion member Kowl for quite a long time. They have a friendly love/hate relationship, and they have many arguments in which Kowl arises as the winner and makes a fool of Bow. Kowl has, on many occasions, voiced his dislike of Bow's musical abilities, but Adora seems to enjoy his songs.

He has also shown some ability as an illusionist. At different times, he has made birds appear out of nowhere and made himself disappear.

Bow was released in the Masters of the Universe Classics toy line. This is the character's second time to be made into an action figure. He is the only male figure from the Princess of Power line up to be released. Bow's backstory is that he was a nobleman in Queen Angella's court.

The 2018 animated series Bow is redesigned as a young archer who was raised alongside his brothers by their fathers, historians who wanted no association with the war and intended Bow to succeed them. He is Princess Glimmer's best friend and also makes use of various types of special arrows.

Bow is voiced by George DiCenzo in the 1980s series and by Marcus Scribner in the 2018 series.

==== Princess Glimmer ====
Glimmer, Princess of Bright Moon, is the daughter of Queen Angella and Micah. She is originally the leader of the Great Rebellion but relinquishes her title to Adora. Despite, being the former leader of the Great Rebellion, she is naive and at times gullible. She also demonstrates moments of impulsiveness. Glimmer comes from a happy family, but her childhood is tinged with sadness. After the Horde arrived on Etheria, her father left to fight them, and was never seen again. Later, when her mother is in battle with the Horde, she too disappears. For many years Glimmer fears she will never see her parents again. One day, a spy discovers that Angella is being held prisoner by Hunga, leader of the Harpies. By this point, Glimmer had established the Rebellion, but gives up her title to Adora, when her mother is rescued by She-Ra. Micah, escaping from Horde World, returns to Etheria for his and Angella's wedding anniversary but is subsequently captured by Hunga the Harpy. Through the help of She-Ra, Glimmer and Angella reunite with Micah.

Glimmer can manipulate light, allowing her to emit pulses or strobes to blind or disorient others, fire laser-like cutting beams or "solid-photon" concussive-force beams, illuminate large areas with radiant light, create explosive-plasma fireworks, and refract light to make herself (or other objects) invisible. In close proximity to her mother, she has the power to fly unaided. She has also demonstrated limited magical abilities, such as a holding spell, as well as short-range teleportation.

Glimmer received an action figure in Masters of the Universe Classics.

Princess Glimmer appears in She-Ra and the Princesses of Power. This version's power derived from the runestone known as the Moonstone which she visits to regularity recharge her powers of line-of-sight teleportation and hurling bolts of photonic energy. Throughout the first season, Glimmer is at odds with her mother over her keeping her from the frontline before understanding Angella's reasons as the two come to an understanding.

Glimmer is voiced by Linda Gary in the 1980s series and by Karen Fukuhara in the 2018 series.

==== Queen Angella ====
Angella, the Queen of Bright Moon and Glimmer's mother, possessing a pair of wings which allow her to fly. Angella is wise and kind, generally beloved by her subjects. She possesses vast mystical powers, which are linked to Bright Moon's Moonstone gem—itself powered by the light of Etheria's three moons. During an eclipse, her powers are drastically weakened. At full strength, she alone has proven more than a match for the Horde itself. Her powers are similar to Glimmer's in that they are primarily based on photonic energy, however at a significantly stronger magnitude than Glimmer's. Also, in contrast to Glimmer, Angella also has the ability to open magical-gateway portals to other dimensions. She also has various spell-casting abilities, of strength sufficient to counteract those of Shadow Weaver.

In the Masters of the Universe Classics toyline, Queen Angella was the first of Etheria's rulers to fight back against the Evil Horde when they first arrived on Etheria and became the founder of the Great Rebellion with the help of key leaders. Angella had the Whispering Woods be used as the headquarters of the Great Rebellion.

Queen Angella appears in She-Ra and the Princesses of Power, portrayed in the first season as an overprotective mother due to feeling responsible for leading the attack against the Horde that supposedly got her husband Micah killed and their alliance dissolved as a result. But by the first-season finale, Angella manages to open up to a despondent Glimmer about her mistakes and the two reach an understanding. Angella later dies by sacrificing herself in the third-season finale by helping Adora close a portal that threatens Etheria. A pre-recorded Star Wars-like hologram of her appears to Glimmer, Adora & Bow in the 4th season's premiere "The Coronation", telling Glimmer of how proud she is of her.

Queen Angella is voiced by Erika Scheimer in the 1980s series and by Reshma Shetty in the reboot.

==== He-Man / Prince Adam ====
He-Man is "the most powerful man in the universe" and in most media he is the alter-ego of Prince Adam. He-Man possesses superhuman strength and is capable of performing incredible feats, such as lifting heavy objects such as boulders and buildings, breaking solid rock with his fists, as well as having the advantage over just about any opponent. He is a formidable warrior, although he usually prefers to avoid conflict. He-Man is a strong upholder of moral justice and is regarded by the people of Eternia as their greatest hero. Prince Adam is the son of King Randor and Queen Marlena of Eternia, and is viewed by many as fun-loving, lazy, and cowardly. This is merely an act to keep people from suspecting that he is also He-Man. Prince Adam was given the Sword of Power by The Sorceress of Castle Grayskull, and when he lifts the sword and says "By the Power of Grayskull... I Have the Power!" he is magically transformed into He-Man, defender of Eternia. In the He-Man and She-Ra The Secret of the Sword film (which is directly in sequential continuity with the original He-Man and The Masters of The Universe animated series) Prince Adam/He-Man is sent on a quest to Etheria by the Sorceress of Grayskull. While on Etheria, He-Man discovers that he has a long lost twin sister, Princess Adora, who was abducted from Eternia as an infant by Hordak and Skeletor. After He-Man rescues Adora from brainwashed service to the Evil Horde, she receives her own magical sword and becomes She-Ra.

For a more details regarding He-Man/Masters of The Universe characters who had recurring or guest roles in the original She-Ra series, see List of He-Man and the Masters of the Universe characters.

==== Princess Frosta ====
Frosta is a valuable member of the Great Rebellion. She is the reigning ruler at Castle Chill in the Kingdom of Snows, an area located at the northernmost pole of Etheria. This area of Etheria has only been attacked on one occasion by the Horde, possibly because of the extreme temperature there. Most of Frosta's people hold a great hatred for the Selkies, a race of seal-like humanoids who live in Galacia, near her own homeland who once warred against them. Frosta, however, does not share her people's mistrust of them. When the Horde arrived, these two races called a truce to their feud to unite against them.

Frosta is able to lower her external and internal body temperature without harm to herself, thereby radiating immense cold from her body, most often as energy-like beams from her hands. Frosta is able to reach -105° degrees Fahrenheit within a few seconds, and is immune to sub-zero temperatures around her. In addition, she can freeze any moisture in the air around her into unusually-hard ice, and thereby form simple objects such as slides, ladders, and shields. Frosta can also freeze objects to the degree that they will shatter when touched or simply localize a small area with snow.

Frosta is a no-nonsense, direct individual who generally isn't afraid to voice her opinion. She later develops a crush on He-Man, and does little to hide her feelings for him. For his part, He-Man seems sometimes embarrassed due to her flirtatious behavior.

In the Masters of the Universe Classics toyline, Frosta's real name is Queen Mackenzie.

Frosta appears in She-Ra and the Princesses of Power as a member of the Princess Alliance, her ethnicity and attire costume changed to the Etherian equivalent to Inuit. While a child ruling the second largest region in Etheria, Frosta intentionally presented herself as serious in the first season before opening up a bit in season two with a habit of going overboard while using her powers to create ice armor to increase her offense and defense.

Frosta is voiced by Erika Scheimer in the 1980s series and by Merit Leighton in the 2018 series.

==== Princess Mermista ====
Mermista is a mermaid and the princess of Salineas, an underwater city on Etheria. Her father King Mercier believes it best to leave The Horde alone, in the hope that they will respect his decision and leave him and his people in peace. Mermista knows that The Horde will stop at nothing to conquer all of Etheria and she is the only member of the people of Salineas who supports the Rebellion. Mermista possesses psionic control of the element of water and telepathy with sea creatures.

In the English-language version of the 1980s series, she speaks with a French accent.

In the Masters of the Universe Classics toyline, Mermista is shown to be at her happiest when visiting She-Ra. During the Second Ultimate Battleground, Mermista fought Mer-Man.

Mermista appears in She-Ra and the Princesses of Power as one of the Princesses that Glimmer, Bow, and Adora come to ask to join the Rebellion. She had a previous relationship with Sea Hawk. Her personality is somewhat nihilistic and lethargic, but comes around to the Rebellion because of the help of the trio. She was also changed to being the Etherian equivalent to South Asian.

Mermista is voiced by Melendy Britt in the 1980s series and by Vella Lovell in the 2018 series.

==== Sorceress of Castle Grayskull ====
The Sorceress (real name Teela Na) is the mystic guardian of Castle Grayskull. She acts as a conduit to the surging energies that dwell within the walls of Castle Grayskull. She can only temporarily access them, as it is shown to overwhelm her when exerting the power for long periods of time. Her powers include; telepathy, telekinesis, clairvoyance, teleportation, large scale energy barriers, mystics bolts, illusion projection and shapeshifting. She can also create portals to various worlds, dimensions and even across time. It is she who bestows on Prince Adam the power to become He-Man. With Grayskull's magic focused by the "Sword of Power", He-Man has inexhaustible access to Grayskulls power. In the original animated series, the Sorceress cannot leave the castle for long periods of time unless she utilizes the “Crystal of Allenar”. It allows her to use the power of Grayskull and remain in her true form temporarily. Once the crystal is exhausted, her link to Grayskull diminishes and she will revert to her falcon form.

==== Netossa ====
Netossa is different from the rest of The Great Rebellion as her ability appears to have no magical or mystical source. Her skill is shown to be the product of her own hard work and practice. She can skillfully throw nets that she keeps on her back. She is so accurate in her aim that she is able to capture a Horde Trooper by casting a net through the bars of her cell door. Netossa has the features of an African-American woman.

In the Masters of the Universe Classics toyline, Netossa comes from a land that was beyond the reaches of the Evil Horde.

Netossa appears in She-Ra and the Princesses of Power. In this continuity, Netossa's powers are magical, being able to cast energy nets of varying size, both for entrapment and as force-fields. She is also married to Spinnerella.

Netossa is voiced by Diane Pershing in the 1980s series and by Krystal Joy Brown in the 2018 series.

==== King Randor ====
King Randor is the ruler of Eternia, son of King Miro, husband to Queen Marlena, and father of Prince Adam and Princess Adora.

In the original animated series, Randor is chiefly shown wearing his crown and royal robes, presiding over dinners, and shaking his head over Adam's supposed laziness and Orko's apparent ineptitude. In the episode "Prince Adam No More," he demonstrates battle abilities when he helps He-Man fight off Skeletor's flying robots as they escape from Snake Mountain, mentioning his "strong left hook" from his warrior years. In the He-Man and She-Ra The Secret of the Sword film, he threatens to tear Snake Mountain to the ground in order to rescue Princess Adora after Skeletor and Hordak abduct her a second time.

==== Queen Marlena ====
Queen Marlena is the Queen of Eternia and mother of the twins Prince Adam and Princess Adora. In the 1980s series, Marlena Glenn is an astronaut from Earth, Boise Idaho. Her ship crash-landed on Eternia. In the 1980s series, Queen Marlena is portrayed wearing a crown and long gown and not doing much other than attending dinners with her husband King Randor. However, in the episode "The Rainbow Warrior", her skills as both a pilot and a leader are shown in great detail. Later in that episode it is hinted that Queen Marlena also knows her son is He-Man.

==== King Miro ====
King Miro (voiced by Lou Scheimer) is King Randor's father and the grandfather of Prince Adam and Princess Adora. In the 1980s series King Miro disappeared for many years where he was held captive by the evil Enchantress. Restored to Eternia, he is taken to Etheria by Prince Adam to meet his granddaughter Adora.

==== Princess Perfuma ====
Perfuma is a member of the Great Rebellion. Cheerful, bubbly and somewhat scatterbrained, Perfuma is a powerful member of the Rebellion. Unlike the other members of the Rebellion, she does not appear to be afraid of Hordak and the other Hordesmen. On one occasion, she is captured by Hordak and imprisoned in a dungeon in the Fright Zone. While prisoner in the Fright Zone, Perfuma decides that it can benefit from a bit of sprucing up. So she escapes and makes her way around the Fright Zone, decorating it with flowers wherever she goes. Hordak is so incensed by this that he begs She-Ra to take her back into the Rebellion.

Being an "ecomancer", she has total control over plants, allowing her to create vines, trees and vast fields of flora at will without the need of sunlight to maintain her plants. Her powers also have been shown to nullify/transform dark energy and fire into cascades of flowers; probably the reason she doesn't fear Hordak.

In the Masters of the Universe Classics toyline, Perfuma had the real name of Tara and was born in an enchanted garden far far away.

Perfuma appears in She-Ra and the Princesses of Power as the acting ruler of Plumeria and member of the current Princess alliance, having a more hippie-like appearance.

Perfuma is voiced by Erika Scheimer in the 1980s series and by Genesis Rodriguez in the 2018 series.

==== Spinnerella ====
Spinnerella only makes one appearance in the She-Ra: Princess of Power series.

In her single episode, she is shown to be a powerful member of The Rebellion. It is established that she and Netossa live in an area of Etheria, which is not controlled by The Horde. When she realizes that she has been duped by Hordak, she turns her power against him. Primarily a dancer, Spinerella has the ability to spin at high speeds, turning into a human cyclone, capable of rapid travel and deflecting oncoming attacks. Spinnerella and Netossa are best friends and love to travel together. She is fooled by Hordak into thinking Netossa has been captured by The Great Rebellion, when it is really The Horde who are responsible. When Spinnerella is told that Netossa has been captured by The Rebellion, she aids The Horde in gaining entry into the Whispering Woods by using her own ability to spin at rapid speeds to disable the trees' power.

In the Masters of the Universe Classics toyline, Spinnerella uses her abilities to deliver messages to the Great Rebellion's loyal friends.

Spinnerella appears in She-Ra and the Princesses of Power. In this continuity, she is a member of the Rebellion who can control the wind and air. She is also depicted with a plus-size figure, and is married to Netossa.

Spinnerella is voiced by Diane Pershing in the 1980s series and by ND Stevenson in the 2018 series.

==== Sea Hawk ====
Sea Hawk
- Masters of the Universe character
- First appearance: "The Sea Hawk" (1985)
- Created by: Larry DiTillio; Curtis Cim; Diane Keener
- Voiced by: George DiCenzo (1980s series); Jordan Fisher (2018 series)

In-universe information
- Alias: Jeoff Blithe
- Title: Captain
- Occupation: Pirate
- Family: Captain Falcon (father)

Sea Hawk is a pirate. He possesses no magical abilities, his skills are the product of hard work. His skills were developed due to the influence of his father, The Falcon. Twenty years before Sea Hawk joined The Great Rebellion, The Falcon disappeared without a trace. Although his father had instilled him with good morals, Sea Hawk spent many years as a pirate, plundering the seas of Etheria. Later, he aids The Horde by delivering supplies. He later reveals that he only helped The Horde for the sum of money they paid him. Underneath his rugged exterior it is established that Sea Hawk is a good man. When he meets Princess Adora, shortly after her own defection from The Horde, she shows him that what he is doing is wrong and he joins The Rebellion in their fight against The Horde.

He usually wields a laser rapier in combat, but he later gains much more powerful weapons from his father, the Falcon. Among these are an Impact Ring, that enhances his physical blows a hundredfold and projects a protective energy shield in the form of a falcon; Seven League Boots that enable him to leap over great distances and a Photon Cutlass, which can stun when its blade glows blue and can cut through any substance when it glows red.

Sea Hawk also develops a crush on Princess Adora, revealing that he likes to spend the time with her, and She-Ra is just a fighting partner to him. This leads Sea Hawk and Adora to start a relationship in which they kissed each other at least twice in the franchise.

In the Masters of the Universe Classics toyline, Sea Hawk is the son of Captain Falcon and commands the Solar Sailor crew. He would receive his weapons from Captain Falcon when Sea Hawk found his father shipwrecked on an island.

Sea Hawk appears in She-Ra and the Princesses of Power, portrayed as a hyperactive glory-seeker with a habit of setting his ships on fire to ram his enemies. He also has an on-and-off relationship with Mermista, constantly flirting with her despite her annoyance.

Sea Hawk is voiced by George DiCenzo in the 1980s series and by Jordan Fisher in the 2018 series.

==== Madame Razz ====
Madame Razz is a witch who lives in The Whispering Woods among the other Twigets. She uses her abilities to help The Great Rebellion in their fight against Hordak and the Evil Horde.

Being a witch, she has spellcasting abilities, and is able to brew potions in her cauldron. With the aid of Broom, she can fly. Madame Razz is very absent-minded, and frequently mispronounces spells or forgets them completely, due to her advanced age. However, they usually have a tendency to work out for the best regardless. The episode "Three Courageous Hearts" strongly hints that Madame Razz is well over 1,000yrs old, as she (to Kowl's amazement) is easily able to read a spellbook written in a language that had been extinct on Etheria for a thousand years, with Broom telling Kowl that "Madame's pretty ancient herself."

She is the equivalent of Orko in the He-Man series, both as comic relief and for occasional periods of wisdom. Also, most of their faces are usually covered by their hats. Madame Razz is one of three people on Etheria that knows Adora is She-Ra; she also tells the tale of how She-Ra met Light Hope, the gatekeeper of The Crystal Castle. Although they share her secret, neither one has ever interacted throughout the series run.

In the Masters of the Universe Classics toyline, Madame Razz is listed as a Twigget.

In the 2018 series, Razz is re-imagined as a somewhat-senile old woman in the Whispering Woods with a connection to the previous She-Ra Mara, who seems to experience time non-linearly, and has a Russian accent.

Madame Razz is voiced by Linda Gary in the 1980s series and by Grey Griffin in the 2018 series.

===== Broom =====
Broom is a sentient broomstick with face and arms who is Madame Razz's friend and can fly enough to serve as her mode of transportation. He also possesses some magical energy and has lent it to Queen Angella along with Glimmer and Madame Razz to fight Shadow Weaver. Shown in a few episodes, it is revealed that Broom also knows that Adora is She-Ra.

Broom is voiced by Lou Scheimer in the 1980s series.

==== Mara ====
Mara was the last She-Ra before Adora in the She-Ra and the Princesses of Power continuity. She does not appear in the original series. Mara makes her first appearance in a holographic demonstration made by Light Hope to explain to Adora the She-Ra line at the Crystal Castle in the episode "Light Hope". Light Hope initially painted Mara as a failure, citing that her actions broke the She-Ra line for many years. Eventually, Adora discovers the truth behind Mara's time as She-Ra. She was originally sent to Etheria by the First Ones to study the planet's magic, along with Light Hope, and was given the sword by her superiors. During this time, she befriended Razz and through her, learned of the deeper meaning behind magic on Etheria. Eventually, she discovered the truth behind the First Ones' project: they intended to syphon the natural magic of Etheria's runestones and the princesses into She-Ra as a massive weapon to use against their enemies, called the Heart of Etheria. Since She-Ra was the only being capable of withstanding all the power, they built the sword as a means to control her. When Mara discovered this and that the First Ones had reprogrammed Light Hope to fire the weapon at any costs, she attempted to stop the weapon from going off and forever hid Etheria in Despondos to keep the Heart from destroying other worlds. This ultimately cost her her life, but she was able to leave a recorded message for Adora explaining everything to her successor.

Mara is voiced by Zehra Fazal.

==== Kowl ====
Kowl is a flying Etherian creature which resembles a cross between a koala and an owl. He is a snarky, sharp-witted member of the Rebellion. Kowl's species was a Kolian but just like the Loo-Kee the Kon-Seal, it was never stated in the series where on Etheria they can be found. His species possess the ability to fly using their giant wing-like ears and someone them like Kowl's cousin Red-Eye are able to read the minds of other members of their species if they have some feathers from the other Kolian. Red-Eye's ability almost allows the Evil Horde to capture their enemies. Although Kowl lacks courage, this does not stop him from trying to help his friends when they are in need. Kowl seems to have developed a strong attachment to fellow Great Rebellion member Bow. Their love/hate relationship suggests they have known each other for quite some time, often implying they didn't like each other when it could be seen that they had a great friendship. Kowl also had a one-time rivalry with Imp so much so that in one episode, Imp attempts to set up Kowl as a Horde spy by planting Horde coins in his bed. Some of The Great Rebellion think Kowl may be a traitor, but Princess Adora firmly believes he is innocent. Later on in the episode, it is revealed that Imp was the one responsible for the coins and that Kowl's innocent. The Rebels apologize to Kowl for not trusting him and he is accepted back into the fold. It should also be noted that Kowl is one of three people on Etheria that knows that Adora is She-Ra and has been to The Crystal Castle to see Light Hope.

In the Masters of the Universe Classics toyline, Kowl was just listed as a type of owl and has a genius-level intellect.

Kowl does not appear in She-Ra and the Princesses of Power. However, Glimmer does have a stuffed animal version of the character in her bedroom.

Kowl is voiced by Lou Scheimer in the 1980s series.

=== Supporting Members ===
==== Queen Castaspella ====
Castaspella is a member of the Great Rebellion. As her name implies, she is a sorceress and is able to wield great magic. She is the Queen of Mysticor. Castaspella is affectionately nicknamed Casta by other members of the Rebellion. Castaspella loves parties and is occasionally prone to mischief.

Castaspella is an extremely powerful sorceress, able to control magical forces of immense strength including: precognitive, communicative, analytical and manipulative spells. To focus and intensify her magic, she linked her powers with her gold armbands. She is one of the most powerful sorceresses on Etheria, along with Queen Angella and Shadow Weaver. She and Shadow Weaver were once friends and fellow pupils of the sorcerer Norwyn when Shadow Weaver was human.

In the Masters of the Universe Classics toyline, Castaspella is one of the most powerful mages on Etheria and became one of the leaders of the Great Rebellion.

Castaspella appears in She-Ra and the Princesses of Power. Castaspella is the sister of King Micah and aunt to Glimmer. It has been hinted that she and her sister-in-law don't get along well. In this version she is Etherian equivalent of Asian.

Castaspella is voiced by Melendy Britt in the 1980s series and by Sandra Oh in the 2018 series.

==== Flutterina ====
Flutterina is a member of The Great Rebellion who has butterfly-like wings. Before she was transformed into Flutterina by Light Hope, her name was "Small One" and she was a laborer in Baron Condor's castle.

In the Masters of the Universe Classics toyline, Flutterina was a member of the Beautifly Council who joined up with the Great Rebellion. She uses her wings to fly quietly when working as a spy and reconnaissance officer.

In the 2018 series, Flutterina is a disguise that Double Trouble assumes to infiltrate the Great Rebellion before being exposed as their saboteur.

Flutterina is voiced by Erika Scheimer in the 1980s series and by Amanda C. Miller in the 2018 series.

==== Double Trouble ====
Double Trouble is a wildcard in the conflict between the Rebellion and the Horde, a master of disguise who can pose as anyone in both appearance and voice. In the 80s toyline, Double Trouble is Glimmer's cousin and Queen Angella's niece from the Kingdom of Green Glade who serves the Rebellion's Chief Spy. While not much of a fighter, she is agile and about to talk her way out of situations. Due to her convincing performances, she is often mistrusted. While conceptualized for the Filmation series, she only appears in comic books and in toy form (first wave).

In the Masters of the Universe Classics toyline, Double Trouble was called "Double Mischief" and serves as the Great Rebellion's double agent.

In the 2018 series, Double Trouble is portrayed as a non-binary chameleon-like shape-shifter who loves causing chaos and is a morally ambiguous sociopath with a theatric flair that plays in their disguises and analyzing people. Double Trouble is formally introduced in season four to offer their services to Catra, infiltrating the Rebellion under the guise of Flutterina as part of Catra's tactics before being captured. Double Trouble later changes sides when Glimmer reveals the Heart of Etheria would give the Rebellion an advantage, sabotaging Catra's plans before leaving her psychologically broken and defeated. Double Trouble later appears in season five in disguise as Prince Peekablue after deeming Horde Prime too dull to work with, making a slight contribution in the Etherians driving off Horde in the series finale.

Double Trouble is voiced by Jacob Tobia in the 2018 series.

According to ND Stevenson, Double Trouble is an homage to Zam Wesell in Star Wars: Episode II – Attack of the Clones.

==== Light Hope ====
Light Hope is a mystical entity of unknown origin and exists as a giant pillar of prismatic light. He possesses great mystical powers, the extent is unknown. He is keeper of "The Crystal Castle" and hides it's entrance from the rest of the world, primarily from the Evil Horde. For within its depths houses the avatars known only as the "First Ones", the founders of Etheria. They are giant god-like figures of primordial flame, profoundly ancient and mystical. Lighthope also acts as an impromptu mentor and advisor to She-Ra in her battles against Hordak and the Horde.

In the Masters of the Universe Classics toyline, Lord Hope gave up his form and was blessed with great power by the Overlords of Trolla. He arrived on Etheria where he became Light Hope, turned the planet into a garden of good, and built the Crystal Castle. He was the one who prophesized that the Sword of He would be wielded by the Twin Warriors of Destiny which led to the Sword of He being cloned by the Overlords of Trolla. The cloned Sword of He was infused with the Stone of Protection.

In She-Ra and the Princesses of Power, Light Hope is a holographic projection developed by the First Ones' ancient technology, normally appearing in a female form while able to alter her appearance if needed.

Light Hope is voiced by Lou Scheimer in the 1980s series and by Morla Gorrondona in the 2018 series.

==== Loo-Kee ====
Loo-Kee is Kon-Seal, a small Etherian creature who resembles a chipmunk. Loo-Kee follows She-Ra and the other members of The Great Rebellion, while hidden behind trees, bushes and other objects. At the end of almost every episode, Loo-Kee emerges and asks the viewer if they had seen where he had been hiding. He then reveals to the viewer where he had been hiding, and then relates the moral of the story.

Other than this, the character makes only two "full" appearances throughout the entire series. In "Loo-Kee Lends a Hand", Light Hope reveals to Loo-Kee the true identities of Prince Adam and Adora as He-Man and She-Ra. The other episode is "Loo-Kee's Sweety". His father Paa-Pee is leader of the Kon-Seals. His girlfriend is Laa-See. The Kon-Seals are seen bringing fruit to prisoners of the Horde.

In the Masters of the Universe Classics toyline, Loo-Kee is an Etherian Cherub Imp who comes from the deepest parts of the Whispering Woods.

Loo-Kee also appears hiding in each issue of the DC Comics series He-Man: The Eternity War (2014–2016).

Loo-Kee is voiced by Erika Scheimer in the 1980s series.

==== Peekablue ====
Peekablue is a member of The Great Rebellion. She possesses blue peacock feathers which give her the ability of enhanced sight, with them she is able to see into the far reaches of the universe. She only reluctantly uses her powers, never fully embracing them.

In the Masters of the Universe Classics toyline, Peekablue later fell in love with Man-E-Faces during the Second Ultimate Battleground.

Prince Peekablue is male in the 2018 version, depicted as a clairvoyant while mentioned in Season One's "Princess Prom", that he is dating Sweet Bee. As he is seldom seen, Double Trouble assumed his identity in the final season.

Peekablue is voiced by Erika Scheimer in the 1980s series and by John Lavelle in the 2018 series.

==== Snout Spout ====
Snout Spout is a cyborg with a human body and a metallic elephant-shaped head. He serves the Great Rebellion as a firefighter, his main power being to spray jets of water, stored in a special pack on his back, from his trunk, which he refills periodically from rivers and lakes. Unlike many of the male characters in the series, Snout Spout's body-design looks more appropriate for the He-Man series, as he wears little clothing, save for boots, a furry loin-cloth and wrist bands. This is because the character was originally designed for the He-Man toyline. He made three appearances in the series. Up until his third appearance, he was referred to by his working name, Hose Nose during production. In his third and final appearance, an attempt was made to connect the character to the He-Man toyline. Introduced as Snout Spout, it's stated by Adora that he and Prince Adam were visiting from Eternia whereas his earlier appearances seem to indicate his status as a member of the Rebellion.

Snout Spout is voiced by Lou Scheimer in the 80s series.

==== Star Sisters ====
The Star Sisters are three sisters that debuted in the Masters of the Universe Classics toyline. It all started when an envious sorceress trapped the Star Sisters in a shooting star. It hurled through the galaxy until it crashed on Etheria. They remained in their prison until the day when Swift Wind's hooves accidentally opened the entrance to their prison. After being freed by She-Ra, the Star Sisters formed an alliance with her.

In the She-Ra and the Princesses of Power 2018 reboot, the Star Sisters are mentioned in Princess Prom and are allies with Princess Frosta. The final season introduces the Star Siblings, refugees from a planet that Horde Prime destroyed and survive by savaging the remains of other destroyed planets. Although initially resistant to the idea, they do eventually form an alliance with Adora and her friends to fight the Horde.

- Starla - The leader of the Star Sisters who can blast enemies with blinding spells of light and sense danger. She created the Star Staffs to maintain a telepathic bond with her other two sisters and assisted the mysterious Whisps in creating the Starburst Cape for She-Ra. In the reboot, she is the youngest of the three, has a trained pet owl named Glory, and fights with throwing knives. Starla is voiced by Erika Scheimer in the 1980s series and by Melissa Fumero in the 2018 series.
- Jewelstar - The youngest of the Star Sisters who can conjure a magic jewel armor that refracts light. In the reboot, Jewelstar is a trans man and the eldest sibling. He has a cybernetic implant for a left eye and fights with a pickaxe-type weapon. Jewelstar is voiced by Melendy Britt in the 1980s series and by Alex Blue Davis in the 2018 series.
- Tallstar - A member of the Star Sisters with size-shifting abilities. In the reboot, she is the middle child and has mechanical arms and legs which she uses in hand-to-hand combat. Tallstar is voiced by Linda Gary in the 1980s series and by Ashley Eckstein in the 2018 series.

==== Sweet-Bee ====
Sweet-Bee is a member of a race of intergalactic Bee People.

Her people fled from their homeworld when it was destroyed when their sun exploded. Sweet Bee's people came to Etheria to find a new home. All of her people possess bee-like wings on the backs which give them the ability to fly. Sweet Bee is sent by The Hive to scout for a new planet to colonize. It is her job to find out if the planet has a good source of water and also if the people of the planet are peaceful in nature. While scouting the planet, her spaceship is captured by Hordak, and he tries to use her people to do his bidding. He-Man and She-Ra free the Bee People from Hordak, but they later come under threat from Skeletor. It is at this time that Sweet Bee decides to join the Great Rebellion to fight for their freedom.

In the Masters of the Universe Classics toyline, Beatrice was granted bee-like wings by Castaspella.

In the Season One episode "Princess Prom" of the Netflix series, she's referenced to by Adora as Peekablue's girlfriend.

Sweet-Bee is voiced by Linda Gary in the 1980s series.

==== King Micah ====
King Micah is Queen Angella's husband and Glimmer's father. He was captured by the Horde for over 15 years until he was finally rescued and reunited with his family. In the 2018 series, Micah was a former apprentice of Shadow Weaver when she was Light Spinner who joined the Rebellion and supposedly died during one of their battles against the Horde. However, it is first hinted in the season 3 finale "The Portal" that he is still alive. His true fate is revealed in the season 4 episode "Beast Island," where it turns out the Horde actually exiled him to Beast Island, and he is subsequently rescued by Adora, Bow, and Swift Wind. Like his sister, Castaspella, in this version his ethnicity is Etherian equivalent of Asian.

King Micah is voiced by George DiCenzo in the 1980s series and by Daniel Dae Kim in the 2018 series. Taylor Gray voices a young King Micah in the 2018 series.

==== Wrong Hordak ====
Wrong Hordak is the name given to one of Horde Prime's clone soldiers in the 2018 series after a shot from Bow's electrical arrow destroys the chip connecting him to the Galactic Horde's larger hive mind. After regaining consciousness, the terrified clone mistakes Bow and Entrapta for other soldiers and accepts Entrapta's name for him, as she had initially mistaken him for Hordak. He possesses a childlike and naive personality due to having had no individual thought for most of his life, initially believing that the Resistance are also clones of Prime and that he was disconnected for a secret mission on Prime's behalf, but gradually comes to understand that Prime is a fraud and tyrant.

Wrong Hordak is voiced by Keston John.

== The Horde ==
The Horde is a fictional intergalactic organization of supervillainous monsters, robots, demons, and sorcerers on Etheria who occupy the land on behalf of their leader Horde Prime. The Fright Zone serves as their base of operations with connections on both Etheria and Eternia. Among its members are:

=== Key Members ===
==== Hordak ====
Hordak (Hor-dak) is Skeletor's old master, She-Ra's archenemy, and the Horde's ruthless cyborg commander who conquered most of the planet Etheria. He is the brother of Horde Prime.

In the 1980s animated series, Hordak is a cyborg who can alter his shape, most often into that of a rocket to make a quick get-away. In the Masters of the Universe comics, Hordak also tries to conquer Eternia, making him a frequent adversary of both He-Man and Skeletor. Hordak is notoriously short-tempered, often abusing his minions (Mantenna in particular, with Hordak constantly sending him down a trap door in his throne room). Despite being evil, Hordak has a sense of humor.

In the 2002 series, Hordak wished to rule over all of Eternia. After he and his minions defeated the Snake Men, Hordak turned his attention to Castle Grayskull and launched an attack against it. He was defeated by King Grayskull, who banished Hordak and his forces to the Abyss and entrapped them in a dimension within. Somehow, ages later, Hordak became Skeletor's master, despite the dimensional differences. Hordak saves Keldor's life after he is mortally injured battling Randor; in saving his life, Hordak transformed Keldor into Skeletor and told him there would one day be a price to pay for Hordak's assistance. Later in the series, Evil-Lyn and Count Marzo attempt to release Hordak from his dimensional prison.

Unlike his former pupil Skeletor, Hordak prefers to place his reliance on science and technology, rather than magic. He suffered no fools and expected the highest standards of excellence from his minions, rewarding them when they succeeded and punishing them severely when they failed.

Hordak serves as the main antagonist for the first four seasons of the 2018 reboot She-Ra and the Princesses of Power. He also makes a cameo appearance in the 2021 He-Man and the Masters of the Universe as Evilyn's father.

His face is a pale flesh color on the figure but pure white in the series. Initially, the figure did not have the left cannon arm as he did in the series. The figure just had two normal arms. However, later variants of Hordak gave him a variety of cyborg-like mechanical gimmicks, reminiscent of the shape-changing powers he displayed in the series.

In the Masters of the Universe Classics toyline, Hordak was known as Hec-Tor Kur who was the second born heir to the Horde Empire.

Hordak is voiced by George DiCenzo in the 1980s series, Colin Murdock in the 2002 He-Man series, Keston John in the 2018 She-Ra series, Kevin Conroy in the 2021 He-Man series, and by Keith David in Masters of the Universe: Revolution.

==== Catra ====
Catra is the Force Captain of the Evil Horde (a position previously held by Adora before she defected). Her trademark is a magical mask, given to her by Hordak, which allows her to transform into a purple panther. Even in human form, Catra has such confidence in her own skills that she is prepared to take on Huntara, one of the toughest warriors in the galaxy.

Catra, like Hordak, is notoriously short-tempered. She has no regard or concern for even her fellow members of the Evil Horde, although Entrapta seemed to come as close to being a friend of Catra's as anyone could get. She despises Adora from her time in the Horde, as she envies the position that Hordak's adopted daughter was holding. Catra particularly despises Scorpia, with whom she has a longstanding rivalry.

In the Masters of the Universe Classics toyline, her bio states that was C'yra, a monarch from the Tri Star System. She gained her mask upon joining the Evil Horde.

In the 2018 series, Catra is naturally cat-like and was Adora's friend before Adora joined the Rebellion. She confessed her love for Adora at the end of season five.

Catra is voiced by Melendy Britt in the 1980s series and by AJ Michalka in She-Ra and the Princesses of Power

==== Entrapta ====
A Horde scientist who specialises in devising traps, Entrapta has two long braids of prehensile hair that can ensnare her enemies. She appears to be a close sidekick of Catra. In the Masters of the Universe Classics toyline, her bio states that she was recruited by Catra when the Evil Horde first invaded Etheria.

Entrapta is a skilled scientist and inventor who is credited with designing advanced equipment for The Horde to employ in their battle against The Great Rebellion. Her specialty is devising different traps for members of The Rebellion. One invention created by Entrapta is the Trapper Tank.

In the Masters of the Universe Classics toyline, Entrapta was Bright Moon's illegitimate ruler Es'tra who was recruited to the Evil Horde by Catra who she befriended.

In the 2018 series, Entrapta is portrayed as a more sympathetic character. She is also canonically autistic, with an autistic crew member of the show influencing her writing a lot. She initially joins the Rebels despite her obsession with technology complicating things for them. But when assumed to have died during a rescue mission in the Fright Zone, Entrapta ends up being captured and convinced by Catra to defect to the Horde with the promise of giving her access to their advanced technology. Though she succumbs to the temptation while providing the Horde with the means to search for First One technology, she essentially rationalizes herself as being neutral in her abstract pursuits of learning the secrets of Etheria's ancient past. She eventually wins Hordak's favour after impressing him with her ability to understand his advanced research, helping him perfect his technology. Entrapta learned what actually happened during Fright Zone mission, but was hesitant in trusting Adora as she warned her against opening a portal. Entrapta learned the portal device could destroy Etheria and refused to complete it, resulting in her exile to Beast Island by Catra covering up her discovery and making her appear as a traitor. She is later discovered and saved by Adora's team, and helps the Rebellion for the rest of the show.

Entrapta is voiced by Linda Gary in the 1980s series and by Christine Woods in the 2018 series.

Entrapta also appears in the Robot Chicken episode "Slaughterhouse on the Prairie" where she, Catra and Scorpia attack Castle Bright Moon. Intercepted by She-Ra in the midst of a menstruation-induced temper, Entrapta is killed when She-Ra bursts her breasts.

==== Skeletor ====
Skeletor is the main antagonist of He-Man, and a recurring major side-antagonist to She-Ra. Previously a Horde member and sorcerer apprentice to Hordak, Skeletor betrayed his former mentor and became an evil overlord in his own right on the dark side of Eternia. In his former role as a follower of Hordak, Skeletor was involved in the abduction of Princess Adora from her parents, King Randor and Queen Marlena. The evil sorcerer has made several attempts to conquer both Eternia and Etheria, and has allied with both Shadow Weaver and, on a separate occasion, with Catra, in attempts to overthrow Hordak.

==== Grizzlor ====
Grizzlor is a hairy man-beast creature from the wild, using his brute strength when attacking his opponents. Most story media have portrayed him as either a mindless brute or as comically unintelligent.

Grizzlor is introduced into the Masters of the Universe toy line in 1985 among the first wave of Evil Horde figures. His figure was packaged with the mini-comic "Grizzlor: The Legend Comes Alive!" which portrays him as a kind of urban legend among the Eternians, a product of apparent "tall tales" about a wild man-beast which roams the night stalking its prey. After Buzz-Off disturbs his Heroic comrades with tales of the creature, it later transpires that Grizzlor is a real creature and has been hired by Hordak to fight against He-Man and the Heroic Warriors. Grizzlor is portrayed as a mindless, savage killing machine, who is defeated by being shown his own reflection in a mirror; he apparently fears nothing but the sight of his own gruesome visage.

Grizzlor also appears in several of the Masters of the Universe comic series. A notable one of these are the UK comics published by London Editions, which portray him as one of the least intelligent of all the evil characters. In this series he is frequently used for comic relief and has a childlike mentality, implying he is not actually evil and has merely been misled by Hordak into helping with his schemes. An origin story in a later issue explains that he comes from the jungle world of Jungulia "on the outer edge of the spiral arm of the N24 galaxy" and is a member of a race of man-beast creatures. Although his race was peaceful, by the age of 428 he had developed savage anger that shocked his family and stumbled across a range of powerful weapons in a cave. His youthful nature led him to see them as toys and play with them as such. When detected with the weapons by Horde Prime's sata-spies, they mistook him for an evil warrior and reported him to Hordak, who beamed him on board his ship, erasing all memories of Jungulia from his mind so he would willingly serve him. At first, upon seeing the advanced weapons, Hordak mistakenly believed Grizzlor must possess an incredible mental genius, but subsequently, Grizzlor proved to have no remote intelligence, rendering Hordak confused as to why Horde Prime wanted him in the Horde.

Grizzlor appears in animated form in the series She-Ra: Princess of Power, in which the Horde are the main villains. The series plays down his savagery, presumably to make his character more suitable for a children's audience. At times it even seems as though he may be more human than animal, particularly in the early episode "Beast Island" in which he is competent enough to operate a computer console and command a series of Destructotanks. However, he is far from intelligent and is usually portrayed as a generic bumbling villain, constantly fouling up Hordak's schemes.

Grizzlor also features in animated form in the 2002 Masters of the Universe animated series. Mattel had intended to release the Horde characters among the next wave of villains, and they were intended to fill the role of the main opposition to He-Man in the show's third season. The second-season episode "The Power of Grayskull" features the Horde in a flashback sequence, as an evil force from Ancient Eternia. Grizzlor was seen amongst Hordak, Leech, and Mantenna in a non-speaking role, and was imprisoned by King Grayskull in the dimension of Despondos with Hordak and the rest of the Horde. Grizzlor made a cameo in a 2018 She-Ra series after appearing in 2002 He-Man Season 2, a Grizzlor mini statue figure has been sculpted and issued by toy sculptors the Four Horsemen.

Coming the Filmation, minicomic, and UK comics canons, the Masters of the Universe Classics mythos established that Grizzlor lived peacefully as Gur'rull Gu'rrooowarrrk on the planet Jungulia until the Horde Empire abducted and brainwashed him into becoming a ferocious warrior. Renamed Grizzlor, he loyally followed Hordak to Preternia to find and kill He-Ro. His ferocity so terrified the ancient Eternians that they spoke of him in myths and legends long after he and the rest of the Horde were banished to Despondos. He served Hordak as his prison guard on Etheria and later returned with him to Eternia and participated in the Second Ultimate Battleground.

Grizzlor is voiced by Lou Scheimer in the 1980s series and by Keston John in She-Ra and the Princesses of Power.

Grizzlor appears in the Robot Chicken episodes "1987" and "No Wait, He Has a Cane", voiced by Seth MacFarlane.

Grizzlor was voted No.4 in The 14 Least Masterful Masters of the Universe by Io9.

==== Horde Prime ====
Horde Prime is the supreme ruler of the intergalactic Horde Empire. Horde Prime was created by Filmation for the She-Ra animated series but has since crossed over to Masters of the Universe as well.

Horde Prime is the ruler of the intergalactic Evil Horde. He is only seen surrounded by smoke. His full true form has never been seen, though the episode For Want of a Horse indicates that he has two heads. A metallic arm comes out of the cloud of smoke when he is outraged or angered. Horde Prime has a son named Prince Zed who calls Hordak his uncle, suggesting that Horde Prime and Hordak may be brothers or at least brothers-in-law.

In the Masters of the Universe comics published in the United Kingdom by London Edition Magazines, Horde Prime appears as a regular-sized bearded humanoid with antennae which protrude through his helmet.

A Horde Prime action figure was finally released in 2012 for the Masters of the Universe Classics toyline, sculpted by the Four Horsemen. It includes two interchangeable heads, one based on his UK comics design and the other resembles his brother Hordak. The latter head also includes a helmet to represent his Filmation look. His real name was Anillis and was responsible for wiping out a lot of Cosmic Enforcers.

Horde Prime appears as the main antagonist in the fifth and final season of She-Ra and the Princesses of Power, as a cybernetic humanoid version of himself with extra eyes transplanted from his clones, who serve as both his personal army and as extensions of himself. Horde Prime discarded one such clone for his physical imperfections and sent him on a suicide mission on the front lines, the clone ending up stranded instead on the planet Etheria in the empty dimension of Despondos, where he named himself Hordak and built his own division of the Horde. For the first three seasons of the series, Hordak sought to open a portal back to the universe to bring the rest of the Horde forces to the planet so they could conquer it and prove that Horde Prime was wrong about him. In the third-season finale, Hordak and Catra successfully open a portal that nearly destroys Etheria before She-Ra destroys it, but allows Horde Prime to pinpoint Hordak's location. But after Etheria is brought into the universe through a portal opened by Light Hope and discovered by Horde Prime and his armada in the fourth season finale, considering his clone's independent actions offensive, Horde Prime erased Hordak's mind and ordered him to be "reconditioned” but was talked out of destroying Etheria by Catra after revealing the Heart of Etheria's existence to him, which he decided to claim as his own. He was destroyed by She-Ra in the series finale after she freed the Heart of Etheria and restored magic to the universe.

Horde Prime is voiced by Lou Scheimer in the 1980s series and by Keston John in the 2018 series.

Writer Emiliano Santalucia revealed the being inside the crystal of the first 200x Masters of the Universe comic series was the Unnamed One from The Powers of Grayskull: The Legend Begins!, he discloses the Unnamed One's essence was split in two, one trapped in the crystal and the other taking a mechanical body and becoming Horde Prime.

==== Imp ====
Imp is a small, shapeshifting Horde spy. He is despised by the other Horde members, apart from Hordak who enjoys his company. Imp more often than not tries to stay on the right side of Hordak to avoid incurring his wrath. He points out to Hordak when other members of the Evil Horde fail in their different missions, and encourages Hordak to vent his anger on them. Because of this nature, Imp is hated by most other members of The Horde. It is not just The Horde who have a dislike for Imp, but also members of The Great Rebellion.

In one episode, Imp attempts to set up Kowl as a Horde spy, by planting Horde coins in his bed. Some of The Rebellion think Kowl may be a traitor, but Adora believes he is innocent. Later in the episode, it is revealed that Imp was the one responsible for the coins and that Kowl is innocent. The Rebels apologize to Kowl for not trusting him. Imp's main task is due to his shape-shifting abilities. He is tasked to spy on members of The Rebellion and report back to Hordak, which has been shown on several occasions, such as informing Hordak of the Red Knight and the birth of Swift Wind's baby on Unicorn Island.

It seems that without Hordak, Imp has little influences within The Horde, being more like a lapdog. Imp is actually rather distinctive amongst the Horde, as he is one of their few members with the ability to fly.

Imp makes an appearance in the 2018 series. Imp's shapeshifting abilities are not shown, but he is still employed as a spy and can record and playback overheard conversation.

Imp's chest form was released as a figure in the Masters of the Universe Classics toyline in 2014. His bio states that he is a devoted minion of Hordak whose talents are loathed by the other Horde members.

Imp is voiced by Erika Scheimer in the 1980s series.

==== Kyle ====
Kyle (voiced by Antony Del Rio) debuted in the 2018 She-Ra and Princesses of Power series which he is exclusive to. A rather weak and timid human character, he is the least effective member of Catra's soldiers, often working alongside Lonnie and Rogelio. In a conversation with Swift Wind, Scorpia almost lets it slip that Kyle has a crush on Rogelio. In season 4, disillusioned Kyle, Rogelio and Lonnie desert from the Horde together.

==== Leech ====
Leech is a slug-like creature with a large and bulky build who uses the suction pads on his hands, feet and mouth to siphon his opponent's life-force, rendering them helpless against him. In the series, he did not have the "extra mouth" that the figure had. Instead, he used his suction cups to drain his enemies' life force.

The second-season episode of the 2002 series "The Power of Grayskull" features the Horde in a flashback sequence, as an evil force from Ancient Eternia. Leech is seen among them in a non-speaking role and was imprisoned by King Grayskull in the dimension of Despondos together with Hordak and the rest of the Horde. Leech does not appear in the 2018 series.

In the Masters of the Universe Classics toyline, Leech is a Slebetor Slugman that came from the bottom of Lake Gnarl when he was drawn to Hordak by a spell by Hordak's lead witch.

Leech is voiced by Lou Scheimer in the 1980s series.

CBR voted Leech 3rd worst He-Man toy.

==== Lohni / Lonnie ====
Lohni debuted as the former second-in-command under force captain Adora in the 1985 She-Ra: Princess of Power animated series in the episode "Friendship". After Adora's defection to the Great Rebellion, Lohni would assist Hordak in an attempt to trap Adora after Hordak had imprisoned her father. Lohni would however have a change of heart, joining the Rebellion herself, and help rescue Adora.

A different version of the character called Lonnie (voiced by Dana Davis) debuted in the 2018 She-Ra and Princesses of Power series as a Horde cadet alongside Adora, Catra, Rogelio and Kyle. After Adora leaves the Horde and Catra is promoted to force captain, Lonnie becomes the leader of the cadets and participates in many battles before they become disillusioned enough to eventually quit the Horde in the fourth season.

==== Mantenna ====
Mantenna is a Horde member with four legs who can fire a variety of energy beams from his pop-out antenna eyes. Mantenna has a stutter and is mainly used for comic relief, with a running gag that Hordak frequently sends him down a trap door in front of his throne for any number of reasons. Although, once or twice Mantenna actually turns the tables on Hordak and sends him plummeting down his own trap. Unlike Grizzlor, Mantenna has shown moments of brilliance, but still remains incompetent.

In the 2002 series, he is redrawn, to be much more menacing. Mantenna attempts to blast King Grayskull with his energy beams but ends up being choked to unconsciousness by the king. Mantenna does not speak in the 2002 series nor appear in the 2018 series.

In the Masters of the Universe Classics toyline, Mantenna is a Rebrunk Nuris from the planet Phelibio IX.

Mantenna is voiced by Lou Scheimer in the 1980s series.

Comic Book Resources voted Mantenna 6th worst He-Man toy.

==== Rogelio ====
Rogelio is a lizard man who is exclusive to the She-Ra and the Princesses of Power animated series. He serves as a Horde soldier often working alongside fellow cadets Lonnie and Kyle. Although a more effective soldier than some, he has little to no speaking lines in the series. In season 4, a disillusioned Kyle, Rogelio, and Lonnie desert from the Horde together.

==== Scorpia ====
A female Horde enforcer with a stinging scorpion tail and sharp pincers, Scorpia appeared in the She-Ra animated series.

She appeared in the first season of the show as one of the Horde's main warriors. She seemed to have jurisdiction over a region called the Crimson Waste, where she owned a scorpion-shaped domicile (with a throne room) replete with slaves.

Scorpia and Catra were often at loggerheads with each other, usually only working together as a last resort, although Scorpia ultimately had to obey Catra as a member of Catra's Force Squad. Scorpia despised Catra throughout the course of the series.

Instead of hands, she possesses claw-like pincers and a powerful tail which was used to capture opponents. Her tail makes her a powerful fighter but is at times a disadvantage to her as She-Ra has used it several times to hurl her out of the way. She is susceptible to flattery, shown when Bow (Sea Hawk in the 2018 reboot) fooled her once into believing that he was a Horde inspector and thus gained access into a secret Horde factory.

Scorpia owned a powerful tank called the Crawler, with a scorpion-shaped tail that shot sleep-rays. She learned the hard way that she may be skilled at both technology and combat, but isn't cut out to practice magic.

The first-ever figure of Scorpia was released as part of the Masters of the Universe Classics in 2014. Her bio states that she is a Scorpioni who surrendered her home in the Crimson Wastes when siding with Hordak.

In the 2018 series, while having a more exaggerated figure with a more simple and naïve personality, Scorpia is revealed to be a Princess whose family were the original rulers of the Fright Zone before swearing loyalty to the Horde and giving Hordak the Black Garnet Runestone. Even before the Horde's arrival to Etheria, Scorpia's family were considered outcasts among the royal families. She becomes Catra's right hand, having strong feelings for her and wanting to help her in any way she can. Besides her huge claw pincers, Scorpia can use her tail to administer a paralyzing venom into whomever she stings. In season four, guilty over her role in Entrapta's exile, Scorpia leaves the Horde and ends up joining the Rebellion while gaining electricity-based powers from connecting to the Black Garnet.

Scorpia is voiced by Linda Gary in the 1980s animated and by Lauren Ash in the 2018 series.

==== Shadow Weaver ====
Shadow Weaver first appeared in the She-Ra animated series as the Evil Horde's Head Mistress of Dark Magic who hides her horrific appearance within a grand crimson hooded robe. She commands an array of Black Magicks, vast encyclopedic knowledge of dark Etherian mystical lore and access to ancient artifacts accumulated by years of Horde dominion over the galaxy. She is often seen as a second-in-command type to Hordak but is still his slave, he has been seen threatening to wipe her mystical advancements away at a whim. Her stygian abode lies on the outskirts of the Fright Zone and is appropriately called Horror Hall. Nicknamed "Weaver" by Hordak, she is a powerful sorceress in her own right, equal to her long-time rival Castaspella.

Shadow Weaver began as an apprentice sorceress at a young age and is originally from the Kingdom of Mysticor. Alongside Castaspella, the two began their training by the greatest Etherian sorcerer, Norwyn. When Hordak arrived on Etheria, he promised her that she would be Head Horde Sorceress and have instant access to the top tier of Horde Magicks in exchange for information on the rebels "Council of Kings" location, to which she agreed. Originally only a second-rate sorceress herself according to Hordak, her capabilities were greatly increased through a magical gem, one that was responsible for a devastatingly unforeseen physical transformation. As promised for her information she was granted access to Hordak's "dark gem" to magnify her powers. Just as she began absorbing power from the gem, Norwyn located her and what she was doing, he then destroyed the gem severing her link to it. She only took a third of its power before suffering an irreversible change both mentally and physically. Now completely corrupted by dark magic, she ultimately turned her back on Mysticor, Norwyn, Castaspella and joined The Horde forever. From the first episodes of She-Ra, Shadow Weaver acted as a sort of adoptive mother for Adora on Hordak's orders.

The first action figure of Shadow Weaver was released in 2012 for the Masters of the Universe Classics toyline. Her bio states that Beatrix was born in Mystacor and was the apprentice to the great mage Norwyn until the day she sided with Hordak.

In the 2018 series, Shadow Weaver was designed to be hoodless and wearing a mask to conceal her disfigurement. She is portrayed to have been originally a disgraced Mystacorian mage named Light Spinner, who left her kingdom long ago and resurfaced as Hordak's second in command with access to the Black Garnet runestone which she learned to draw power from. For years she favored Adora over Catra during their upbringing, to the point of acting against Hordak's orders as she focused her full attention on reclaiming Adora. However, this gradually leads to Shadow Weaver's downfall as Catra wins Hordak's favor and replaces her, while Shadow Weaver is imprisoned for violently refusing to relinquish the Black Garnet to her former subordinate. She later defects to the Rebellion and continues to assist Adora, despite the misgivings of her friends. In the season finale, she sacrifices herself to destroy a monster barring Adora and Catra from reaching the Heart of Etheria.

Shadow Weaver is voiced by Linda Gary in the 1980s series and Lorraine Toussaint in the 2018 series.

==== Horde Troopers ====
The Horde Troopers or Hordesmen are robotic soldiers that serve the Horde Empire, and form the bulk of the Evil Horde's vast army. They wear grey armor emblazoned with the Horde insignia. Debuting in the She-Ra animated series, they also appeared alongside Hordak in various MOTU comics. A Horde Trooper action figure was released in 1986 for the vintage Masters of the Universe toy line.

An updated pair of Horde Troopers was released in 2014 for the Masters of the Universe Classics toyline. Their bio states that they are mass-produced in the Horde's factories.

The Horde Troopers are voiced by Lou Scheimer in the 1980s series.

==== Horde Wraiths ====
The Horde Wraiths are a group of magicians that work for Hordak.

In the 2002 series, the Horde Wraiths are shown in flashbacks detailing Hordak's time on Eternia. One flashback detailed Hordak having them use the Spell of Separation from the Tablet of Triad and Separation which nearly destroyed the planet. Another flashback had them partaking in the Evil Horde's fight with King Grayskull.

In the Masters of the Universe Classics toyline, the Horde Wraiths are the results of different magicians throughout the galaxy being enslaved by the Gem of Horokoth. During the plans to obtain the Starseed from the center of Eternia, King Grayskull interfered and stopped Hordak at the cost of Hordak's lead witch. That witch was replaced by Shadow Weaver who maintained her free will when the Gem of Horokoth was destroyed by Castaspella.

=== Other members ===
==== Admiral Scurvy ====
Admiral Scurvy is a member of the Horde who oversees their naval operations on the Horde Dreadnought. He is also a rival of Sea Hawk.

Admiral Scurvy appears in the fourth season of She-Ra and the Princesses of Power as a free agent and a former friend of Sea Hawk's, before Sea Hawk burned his ships. He later captures Sea Hawk, Bow, and Swift Wind to receive the bounty on them from Octavia.

Admiral Scurvy is voiced by George DiCenzo in the 1980s series and by Keston John in the 2018 series.

===== Squall =====
Squall is Admiral Scurvy's pet cat who is overweight and wears an eyepatch.

==== Callix ====
Callix (voiced by Scott McNeil in the 2002 series) is a Vebex Rock Man from the Tri Solar System and one of Hordak's generals who can crumble him into pebbles and reassemble himself. His name is also spelled Calyx.

He first appeared briefly in the 2002 He-Man animated series. He was present with Hordak outside Castle Grayskull. When Callix gave Hordak the bad news about the Snake Men's defeat and how it will be difficult to attack Castle Grayskull, Hordak crumbled him to dust.

Callix received a toy in the Masters of the Universe Classics toyline in 2015. He was recruited into the Horde during his youth and rose to the ranks due to his insight and perspective of the Horde's enemies.

==== Colonel Blast ====
Colonel Blast is a Horde commander with electro-energy weapons built into his armor. He appears to be quite muscular and strong, but in reality, he is a rather scrawny and unimpressive man underneath the armor.

He was based on the prototype for Rio Blast, a heroic character.

Colonel Blast is voiced by Lou Scheimer in the 1980s series.

==== Cy-Chop ====
Newly created for the Masters of the Universe Classics toyline, Cy-Chop is a cyborg bounty hunter with scissor-like hands, blue furry limbs, and a transparent torso. He was created for the 30th Anniversary of the Masters of the Universe toyline by Mattel's Terry Higuchi.

In his earlier years, Scychor roamed the galaxy as a mercenary and professional thief with his partner Kronis until he was betrayed by him and thrown from the vehicle to the surface of a small Moon that was below them. The rogue scientists on that Moon saved him by preserving his organs in the robot body's chest and his brain in a robotic skull. As Cy-Chop, he was recruited by Hordak to fight against the Masters of the Universe and the Snake Men.

==== Dragstor ====
Dragstor is a cyborg who is part man, part vehicle. He has rocket thrusters on his back and a tyred wheel built into his chest which he uses to cruise along the ground at super-speed. He never appeared in the He-Man or She-Ra animated series because he was one of the penultimate toys to be released, by which time both series had ended.

In the comics, he was originally an ordinary athlete who (along with his best friend) was kidnapped and transformed by Hordak where Dragstor was mind-controlled to serve him. His friend became the Heroic Warrior Extendar, who has vowed to free Dragstor from the Horde's mind control.

In the Masters of the Universe Classics toyline, Dragstor was a fast athlete on Etheria who was among those that were thrown into the Experimentation Matrix and was transformed into his cyborg form.

Dragstor was voted No.6 in The 12 Coolest Masters of the Universe Action Features by Topless Robot.

==== Dylamug ====
Dylamug is a large, super-advanced evil robot who is occasionally placed in charge of Hordak's Horde Troopers.

He was based on concept art for a Mattel action figure called Dial-A-Feature, which would have had a similar gimmick as Man-E-Faces, but with the face divided horizontally into sections, allowing his eyes, nose, and mouth dials to be rotated individually.

In the Masters of the Universe Classics toyline, Dylamug was originally a diplomatic droid from the planet Robotica until Hordak captured and reprogrammed him.

Dylamug is voiced by George DiCenzo in the 1980s series.

==== Inspector Darkney ====
Inspector Darkney is the Horde Inspector that works for Horde Prime.

Inspector Darkney is voiced by George DiCenzo.

==== False Face ====
False Face is a member of The Evil Horde who only appears once throughout the series' run. In this episode, it is established that his power is to mimic the appearance of anyone he wishes. It is never clarified whether he could mimic another character's powers as well as their appearance.

In the episode, he is shown taking the form of Prince Highcliff, who had been visiting Bright Moon. Once in the form of the Prince, Hordak tells him that he will go to Bright Moon and spy on the Rebels in order to find a weak spot in their ranks. The Horde can then use this achilles' heel and defeat The Great Rebellion. False Face uses his disguise to enter Bright Moon and kidnaps Glimmer and steals the Moonstone, which powers Bright Moon. Back in the Fright Zone, False Face is thwarted by the real Prince and Glimmer retrieves the Moonstone. They rush back to Castle Bright Moon hopefully before The Horde can attack and overpower the people.

False Face is voiced by George DiCenzo in the 1980s series.

==== Modulok ====
Modulok is a multi-bodied monster who can reform himself into thousands of different shapes to confuse his enemies. Modulok was originally a mad Eternian scientist named Galen Nycroft imprisoned in Palace Eternos' dungeons. After gathering enough parts, he constructed a machine to grant him the power he desired subsequently mutating into Modulok. After escaping, he sought to join Skeletor's Evil Warriors. Once joined, Modulok grows despondent with Skeletor's rule and fled to Etheria offering his services to Hordak. Here, he would create his sidekick, Multi-Bot. He does not have many major roles in the original He-Man series as it was drawing to a close before the Evil Horde figures were released. In the She-Ra series, he appears from time to time as Hordak's chief scientist.

In the Masters of the Universe Classics toyline, Galen Nycroff is a mad scientist from the Tri Solar System was imprisoned on Prison Starr. While awaiting his execution, Galen constructed a device to divide his body into pieces while having his own evil conscious in them. Becoming Modulok, he escaped from prison and arrived on Horde World where he was assigned to work for Hordak.

Modulok is voiced by Lou Scheimer in the 1980s series.

==== Multi-Bot ====
A member of the Evil Horde, Multi-Bot is a robot composed of multiple body parts which he can reform at will into thousands of different shapes. He is a robotic creation and counterpart of the character Modulok whose action figure also consisted of numerous different body parts which could be locked together in many different ways. He was marketed as the "evil robot of a thousand bodies". He is designed to allow his body parts to be combined with those of Modulok, with their merged form known as Mega-Beast.

In the Masters of the Universe Classics toyline, Multi-Bot was created by Modulok after he was wounded by the Masters of the Universe.

Multi-Bot is voiced by Lou Scheimer in the 1980s series.

==== Mosquitor ====
Mosquitor is a mosquito-themed insectoid villain who was introduced into the MotU toy line in 1987. He was one of the final figures to be released before the toy line's demise, and as a result is one of the rarest, meaning he never had any animated appearances. The action figure's special feature is a switch on its back, which when pressed caused his chest to flow with blood.

In the Masters of the Universe Classics toyline, Mosquitor is a Kribleen insectoid vampire from the Bluubux Galaxy who joined the Evil Horde on his accord.

In the 2021 He-Man and the Masters of the Universe series, the character is reinterpreted as a female character named Mo'squita-ra who is voiced by Grey Griffin.

==== Octavia ====
An octopus woman who commands the naval branch of the Horde armada, Octavia was created for the She-Ra animated series.

Octavia is an octopus woman from Octopus Cove. She is the Horde commander at a port near the Sea of Sigh, a small Etherian ocean. Although she caught She-Ra in her tentacles upon first meeting her, Octavia proved to be no match for the Princess of Power. Sea Hawk, on the other hand, was not nearly as successful at defending himself from Octavia, who even brandished hidden swords when challenged by the pirate. After being seized by her tentacles, Sea Hawk appeared to be drained of energy, suggesting that Octavia has abilities similar to Leech. She was also vastly more intelligent than the average Horde villain.

Octavia appears in a flashback in She-Ra and the Princesses of Power as a Horde force captain having been injured by a younger Catra during training. She briefly returns in the fourth season episode "Boys' Night Out".

A Masters of the Universe Classics figure of her was released in 2012. Her bio states that she is an Aquatican who was recruited from her home in Octopus Cove by Hordak and rose through the ranks in the Evil Horde.

Octavia is voiced by Melendy Britt in the 1980s series and by Amy Landecker in the 2018 series.

==== Spyster ====
Spyster is a member of the Evil Horde. He is a for-hire spy (hence the name) and works for Hordak after being paid. He appeared in only one episode in Season 2 titled "The Inspector".

Spyster is voiced by Alan Oppenheimer in the 1980s series.

==== Vultak ====
Vultak is a vulture-like man with a beak-like nose, vulture wings, and vulture talons for feet. He works for the Horde where he runs Hordak's Zoo and regularly hunts new creatures for this facility.

Besides his ability to fly, he can use a special amulet to transform into a vampiric black shadow which comes in handy when obtaining creatures for Hordak's Zoo.

In the Masters of the Universe Classics toyline, Vultak became an enemy of Stratos after he slew many Avionians in the Battle of Xarkoran.

Vultak is voiced by George DiCenzo in the 1980s series.

==== Wrap Trap ====
Wrap Trap is an evil mummy who debuted in the Masters of the Universe Classics toyline.

In the past, Sibor is a disfigured priest and inhabitant of the Sands of Time who worked for the mystic Kartan. He had a crush on Kartan's daughter Princess Naka-Ra. When Princess Naka-Ra turned down his love for her, there was a struggle which led to Princess Naka-Ra's accidental death. Sibor then defiled the Temple of the Sun by trying to raise her from the dead. The Deathless Soldiers of Kartan stopped him and Kartan sentenced Sibor to be mummified alive while reading from the Netherworld Scroll. Eons later, Sibor's tomb was found by Hordak and Shadow Weaver and used the Netherworld Scroll to awaken Sibor. Enthralled by the Evil Horde and controlled by the Netherworld Scroll, Sibor became Wrap Trap and uses his enchanted bandages to strangle and ensnare his enemies. Though he would not attack She-Ra because she resembled Princess Naka-Ra.

== Other characters ==
- General Sunder (voiced by George DiCenzo) - General Sunder was once one of Hordak's prime army generals in the Horde. Unlike most of the Evil Horde, Sunder is honorable. Sunder is also competent and brave, at one point directly contradicting Hordak while serving as one of his generals. Convinced by She-Ra to change his ways, Sunder leaves the Horde to live a peaceful life as a quiet farmer with his wife, Mally, and young daughter, Telzy. But when the Rebels need help, he is still ready to use his battle skills to aid them.
- Queen Hunga (voiced by Melendy Britt) - Queen Hunga is a harpy who is the ruler of the Harpies on Talon Mountain. She has antagonized She-Ra on different occasions. Queen Hunga is also the arch-enemy of Queen Angella. Although Hunga is not part of the Evil Horde, she and her harpies are aligned to their cause.
  - Gayda (voiced by Erika Scheimer) - Gayda is a harpy who is Hunga's sister and second-in-command.
- Huntara (voiced by Erika Scheimer in the 1980s series, Geena Davis in the 2018 series) - Huntara is a female warrior from the planet Silax, whose natives are the greatest hunters, trappers, and warriors in the universe. They are also dedicated to battling evil. Hordak summons Huntara to Etheria and deceives her into believing the Great Rebellion's members are evil. She captures Glimmer and uses her as bait to draw out She-Ra, but later discovers Hordak's deception. Huntara leaves Etheria soon after, but vows that the next time she and She-Ra meet, it will be as friends. Although she only appeared in one episode, Huntara is one of the series' most popular characters. Her look was loosely based on Grace Jones. She appeared in seasons 3 and 4 of the 2018 series.
- Kolians - The Kolians are creatures that Kowl is a part of
  - Kowla (voiced by Erika Scheimer) - Kowla is a female of Kowl's species.
  - Red-Eye (voiced by Lou Scheimer) - Red-Eye is Kowl's evil cousin.
- Red Knight (voiced by George DiCenzo) - The Red Knight who is one of the (if not the most) finest warriors of Etheria. He appears only in one episode and before that he was considered merely an "urban legend". It's strongly implied that he is in fact either Queen Angella's father or King Micah himself.
- Sorrowful (voiced by Lou Scheimer) - Sorrowful is a cowardly rebel dragon.
- Twiggets - The Twiggets are the diminutive plant-like humanoid race who populate the Whispering Woods. They are easily identified by their white hair and purple skin. The Twiggets are shown to get ill if the Whispering Woods is dying. In battle, the Twiggets wield crossbows. The Masters of the Universe Classics toyline lists Madame Razz as a Twigget.
  - King Sprite (voiced by Lou Scheimer) - The King of the Twiggets.
  - Queen Sparkle - The Queen of the Twiggets and King Sprite's wife.
  - Sprag (voiced by Lou Scheimer) - A prominent member of the Twiggets who often accompanies Adora, Bow, and Glimmer on their missions.
  - Sprocker (voiced by Lou Scheimer) - A fat and prominent Twigget who often accompanies Adora, Bow, and Glimmer on their missions.
  - Sprint (voiced by Erika Scheimer) - A prominent member of the Twiggets who often accompanies Adora, Bow, and Glimmer on their missions. In "Portrait of Doom," it is revealed that Sprint is an expert at doing cartwheels.
  - Spritina (voiced by Erika Scheimer) - A more prominent members of the Twiggets where she spends most of the time at the Great Rebellion's camp and often accompanies Adora, Bow, and Glimmer on their missions.
  - Spunky (voiced by Erika Scheimer) - A Twigget who is Twigget Village's residential musician.

== See also ==
- List of He-Man and the Masters of the Universe characters
