= She-Ra =

Lead character of a 1985 and 2018 animated series

- She-Ra in the 1985 series (left) and 2018 series.
- First appearance: The Story of She-Ra (1984)
- Created by: Larry DiTillio; J. Michael Straczynski; Diane Keener
- Voiced by: Melendy Britt (1985–1987); Aimee Carrero (2018–2020); LaLa Nestor (2018–2020; Young); Grey DeLisle (2024; as Despara); Alyson Leigh Rosenfeld (TBA; He-Man and the Masters of the Universe: Pearls of Destruction)
- Portrayed by: Lauren Saliu (2026)
- Real name: Adora

In-universe information
- Nicknames: The Princess of Power; The Most Powerful Woman in the Universe
- Race: Human/Eternian Hybrid (1985); First One (2018)
- Gender: Female
- Title: Princess
- Occupation: Military Captain (formerly); Rebel Leader (currently); Princess of Eternia
- Family: He-Ro (ancestor); King Grayskull (ancestor); King Miro (grandfather); King Randor (father); Queen Marlena (mother); Prince Adam / He-Man (twin brother); Hordak (adopted father); Shadow Weaver (adopted mother); Prince Keldor / Skeletor (uncle, in certain canon depictions)
- Significant others: Sea Hawk (husband, 1985 series and comic continuations); Catra (girlfriend, 2018 series)
- Abilities: Superhuman strength, stamina, durability, endurance, speed, agility, reflexes, longevity, and senses; Zoolingualism; Mystical healing; The Sword of Protection grants: Nigh indestructibility; Energy blasts; Shapeshifting sword

Princess Adora, known by her alter-ego She-Ra, is a fictional superheroine in the Masters of the Universe franchise. She is introduced as the protagonist of the 1985 Filmation series She-Ra: Princess of Power, which reveals her to be the long lost twin sister of He-Man. She-Ra again appears in the 2018 reboot She-Ra and the Princesses of Power. A series of toys under her name was produced by Mattel in 1984. She has also appeared in a number of Masters of the Universe comic books, most notably in DC Comics' 2012–2018 MOTU comic series, a roughly 1,000 page single story arc, collected in the 2019 He-Man and the Masters of the Universe Omnibus hardcover release. In these comics and in the Masters of the Universe Classics toyline, she also has an evil persona called Despara. As Despara, she makes an appearance at the end of Rob David and Kevin Smith's 2024 Netflix release Masters of the Universe: Revolution, the third installment of the 2021 Masters of the Universe animated series. She's also featured in multiple story books, mainly Golden Books and Ladybird books, and in some MOTU games.

Her first published appearance was in the 1984 minicomic "The Story of She-Ra", which, like the subsequent He-Man and She-Ra animated feature film, introduced her as He-Man's twin sister, Princess Adora, kidnapped by Hordak in her infancy. That minicomic, which features He-Man, the Sorceress of Castle Grayskull, and Castle Grayskull itself, also features one of the first published appearances of both Hordak and Catra. The minicomic was shipped with the 1985 released original She-Ra action-figure/doll.

In the 1985 series, She-Ra was intended to extend the appeal of the Masters of the Universe setting by being of interest to young girls in the same way that He-Man appealed to young boys. While brainstorming names that could serve as a female counterpart of "He-Man", a Mattel executive jokingly suggested "Sheila", and it became the basis for She-Ra. Filmation writers Larry DiTillio and J. Michael Straczynski created the backstory for the property. She-Ra was introduced in the movie The Secret of the Sword as Force Captain Adora of the Horde ruling Etheria, but turned out to be Princess Adora, the long-lost twin sister of He-Man, Prince Adam. The 2018 series features a younger She-Ra and is set in a different universe, with only limited connections to Masters of the Universe (primarily through Hordak and the Horde, which originated in the MOTU toyline).

== In She-Ra: Princess of Power (1985) ==
=== Fictional character biography ===
She-Ra as Adora from She-Ra: Princess of Power 1985

King Randor and Queen Marlena from planet Eternia had twins, a boy and a girl named Adam and Adora. Hordak, leader of the Evil Horde, kidnapped Adora and escaped to Etheria, where Adora was raised as a mind-controlled Force Captain of The Horde. Adora's uniform – which she continued to wear throughout the series, even after defecting to the Rebels – consisted of a red leotard (suggesting a 1-piece bathing suit) with long white sleeves, red boots with matching gauntlets, and a black belt.

The Sorceress sent Adam and Cringer to the planet Etheria to find the Sword of Protection's rightful owner. The Sorceress, through the jewel in the Sword of Protection, reveals to Adora that she was kidnapped by The Horde when she was a baby and that she had a twin brother in (Adam/He-Man), which she instantly believed. Through her newfound love for her brother and seeing him in trouble, Adora breaks the spell that was making her serve the Horde and transformed into the heroine She-Ra. She then releases a captured He-Man and jumps from a window, crashing into the Horde stables, where she lands atop her personal mount Spirit, who is transformed into Swift Wind, a talking winged unicorn. They fly ahead to warn The Rebellion. He-Man and She-Ra return to Eternia, but she decides she must return to Etheria so that she can help free the planet from the Horde oppression.

Adora, having been trained by the Horde her entire life, assumes leadership of the Great Rebellion. The epic battle to free Etheria from the grip of the Evil Horde rages on, spreading across the corners of the planet. Through this war, She-Ra calls upon her allies across the globe and the Universe, using their special talents to battle against Horde creations. It is implied in several episodes that she has romantic feelings towards the rebel pirate Captain Sea Hawk, who is attracted to her in her guise of Adora, as opposed to She-Ra. In the extended MOTU/POP Universe they get married and have children who aid them in battle on Etheria, Eternia and across the Galaxies. Whether or not She-Ra, He-Man and their friends were ever successful in defeating the Horde or the Forces of Evil was never revealed, as both series were cancelled before any definite resolutions could be reached. However, it was shown that, little-by-little, the citizens and kingdoms all over Etheria were rising up against the Horde and pushing back against their tyranny. Unlike Adam, who often feigned laziness and a carefree attitude to deflect any suspicion that he may be He-Man, Adora never acted against her nature and was always seen as brave and selfless, willing to help others in need at a moment's notice.

When Adora transforms to She-Ra, two castles are shown in the background. The first is Castle Grayskull; the second, Crystal Castle, is located atop Skydancer Mountain and is overseen by an entity called Light Hope, who advises She-Ra in times of crisis. In the Princess of Power toyline, the castle is also protected by two winged crystal horses, Moonbeam and Sun Dancer. The Crystal Castle's location is known only to Ahgo (King of the Trolls), She-Ra and her allies who know of her secret (Madame Razz, Kowl and Spirit/Swift Wind), and He-Man and his allies who know of his secret (Sorceress, Man at Arms, Orko and Cringer/Battle Cat). She-Ra has sworn to keep its location secret, thus earning the title of "Defender of the Crystal Castle". In the extended MOTU/POP universe, She-Ra travels alongside Sea Hawk in his new version of the Solar Sailor ship, which can now fly in both space and air, ride the sea on water, and submerge in its depths. She also journeys the Universe alongside He Man in his Starship Eternia as a member of the Galaxy Defenders.

=== Powers and abilities ===
She-Ra is known for her incredible feats and charisma. She has been shown multiple times to be able to lift not only full-grown men and robots, but also mountain-like rocks and buildings. She is depicted as being extremely fast and acrobatic. Her speed allows her to easily deflect multiple incoming energy blasts with her sword. She-Ra demonstrated a series of other abilities which appear to be more nurturing in nature such as empathic understanding, mental communication with animals, and healing. Whether there is a limit to the length of time she can remain in her heroic form before she reverts to her original form of Adora is unknown. There have been occasions where she is forcibly transformed back into Adora, implying that her powers do have limits to them.

She-Ra's primary weapon is her Sword of Protection. It appears almost indestructible and able to deflect bolts of energy, both magical and technological, as well as project beams of energy from the stone in its center. The stone is also used to turn Spirit into Swift Wind, as the power beam needed to perform the transformation comes from it (as opposed to the Sword of Power, where the energy beam that is used to transform Cringer into Battle Cat is shot from the tip of the sword and requires He-Man to point it directly at Cringer in order for it to work).

In one episode, the stone in She-Ra's sword becomes damaged, causing her to be unable to transform into She-Ra. Another potential weakness is that the sword requires vocal command: in an episode in which Shadow Weaver captured Adora's voice, she was unable to turn into She-Ra by speaking her words of transformation to the sword ("For the honor of Grayskull, I am She-Ra").

The sword also had transmutation abilities – upon command it would change shape into whatever She-Ra required at the time, for example a shield, parachute, helmet, rope with grappling hook, and a boomerang. She-Ra is largely non-violent and engages in combat only as a last resort.

=== Reception ===
She-Ra is mostly considered a positive role model for women, although some have criticized her for being a poor female counterpart to He-Man.

== In She-Ra and the Princesses of Power (2018–2020) ==
On December 12, 2017, DreamWorks Animation and Netflix announced a reboot series based on She-Ra. The series was executively produced by author ND Stevenson (creator of Nimona and Lumberjanes). The cast was revealed on May 18, 2018, alongside a poster and the official series title: She-Ra and the Princesses of Power. It premiered on November 13, 2018, on Netflix. Unlike the original series, He-Man has no presence in the reboot storyline and is not portrayed to be related or connected in any way, last appearing in a 2002 series. The reboot is a reimagining of the 1980s version and is not part of the Masters of the Universe storyline, the only connection being Adora's transformation chant still including the word "Grayskull".

=== Fictional character biography ===
Reboot She-Ra, as she appeared at a young age.

Adora grew up in the rigid structure of the Horde, taught from infancy to see the Rebellion as oppressors. She embraced that life wholeheartedly—because she only knew that life—until she discovered its lies and chose to rebel. She was raised to believe that the princesses are evil and oppress Etheria. She was brought up in the rigorous military environment alongside Catra under their mentor/mother-figure Shadow Weaver, who took Adora in after Hordak found her as a baby years prior. When Adora is promoted to Force Captain, her world view greatly changed when she finds the Sword of Protection one day after sneaking out of the Horde base. She is soon captured by two rebels, Princess Glimmer and her best friend Bow, learning the truth that the Horde are the real oppressors. Upon the revelation and gaining the ability to become She-Ra, Adora joins the rebellion, winning over its hesitant members while struggling in mastering her powers. But Adora's defection causes a rift between her and Catra, whose initial feelings of abandonment become resentment towards her closest friend, with Adora eventually seeing Catra as an enemy when she nearly destroyed Etheria out of spite. Catra regains her friendship with Adora and helps in defeating the Horde.

Adora later learns that she is a descendant of the First Ones, a colonizer race that weaponized Etheria to harvest its magic in their Heart of Etheria project, revealed to have been brought to Etheria by Light Hope to fulfill her mission. This forces Adora to destroy the Sword of Protection to prevent Etheria's destruction, but leaves it open to invasion by Horde Prime. But while leaving Etheria to save Glimmer and Catra, Adora regains her ability to become She-Ra. Adora later learns that only she can restore the magic to Etheria with the risk of dying in the process, but is saved by Catra as the two finally express their romantic feelings for each other.

=== Powers, abilities and appearance ===
Compared to the original version of the character, Adora has a much younger appearance, only becoming considerably taller as She-Ra: 8 ft 0 in (2.44 m). In addition, She-Ra's costume different in this incarnation; she wears a full tunic that covers her upper torso with metallic epaulets while wearing bike-short type leggings under her skirt. She now wears armored boots with flat soles. In the season 1 finale, She-Ra wears a golden battle armor very similar to when her 2002 twin brother He-Man wears a snake armor in his Season 2.

In the second season, She-Ra uses a new power discovered in her sword, which can transform it into any kind of weapon or piece of equipment. But her control over the transformations is not perfect. After destroying the Sword of Protection in the season 4 finale, Adora couldn't transform until halfway through season 5, after which she gained a new unnamed appearance for She-Ra (dubbed She-Ra 2.0 by fans): she wore her long golden hair in a regular ponytail that reached down to her back, wore a different diadem/headpiece with smaller wings, white pants with golden bracelets for her thighs and longer golden arm bands while the sword became a mystic projection that turns into a slimmed-down battle blade.

=== Reception ===
While reviewing the first season of Princesses of Power, Alex Abad-Santos of Vox praised how the series fleshed out her character, calling the rebooted rendition of Adora "more human than the original". However, IGN's David Griffin was more critical of Adora, writing that her "sudden lifestyle change feels rushed, like we needed a few more episodes of her mentally wrestling with the implications of it all." Griffin also criticized her "seemingly unparalleled strength", stating it "often makes her seem more like One Punch Woman and robs the show of much of its suspense once Adora transforms."

Adora's lesbian relationship with Catra received positively reviews by critics, with many considering their dynamic "captivating" and "groundbreaking",,with LGBTQ+ media outlets such as GLAAD praising the storyline for queer representation in animation,. However, detractors argued that Adora's relationship with Catra is extremely toxic. While defenders of the arc and series creator ND Stevenson emphasized that Catra's behaviour was a direct manifestation of the child abuse and psychological conditioning she endured, critics against the pairing contended that Catra's actions throughout the first four seasons could not be resolved within a single season.

== In other media ==
=== "The Story of She-Ra" ===
While Adora/She-Ra's first on screen appearance was the 1985 animated theatrical movie He-Man and She-Ra: The Secret of the Sword, her actual very first appearance was in the 1984 created and published "The Story of She-Ra" Mattel minicomic, which was packaged with the original She-Ra toy. The main premise of the story, the first ever published story of She-Ra's origin, is roughly identical to the version shown in The Secret of the Sword movie, opening in almost the exact same manner, with the Sorceress of Grayskull having a nightmarish recollection of baby Princess Adora being abducted from the royal palace of Eternia by the evil warlock/warlord Hordak, and whisked away to Etheria. As in the movie & subsequent She-Ra television series, Adora's twin brother Adam/He-Man is sent to find her. Differences between the comic and the film include Catra being a more powerful and prominent villain in the comic (she becomes the primary antagonist, and is also portrayed as a powerful sorceress, able to transform people into werecats), and slight differences in the looks of Catra, She-Ra and the Crystal Palace.

=== He-Man and She-Ra: The Secret of the Sword (1985 animated film) ===
In 1985, Filmation, the studio which produced the He-Man cartoon series, released a full-length 91 minute feature film titled The Secret of the Sword also known as He-Man and She-Ra: The Secret of the Sword. The movie transitioned from a focus on He-Man, to an introduction of Adam's/He-Man's twin sister Adora, whom the film reveals to have been abducted, as an infant, by Hordak and Skeletor. Hordak raised Adora to be a warrior and captain for his Evil Horde, and hid her true heritage from her. The film reveals that He-Man's power sword also has a twin, the Sword of Protection, which, when wielded by Adora to summon the power of Grayskull, transforms her into She-Ra, the female counterpart to He-Man. The movie grossed over three times its two-million dollar production budget. It was later divided into several shorter segments, and aired on television as the first several episodes of the He-Man & MOTU spinoff series She-Ra: Princess of Power.

=== He-Man & She-Ra: A Christmas Special (1985 made for television Christmas movie) ===
At the height of the conjoined popularity of the "He-Man and the Masters of the Universe" and She-Ra: Princess of Power cartoons, Filmation produced this made for television Christmas movie, and aired it in syndication during the 1985 Christmas Holiday season. The original He-Man and the Masters of the Universe cartoon series had aired its final new episode the prior month, and continued to air in re-run episodes for some time after. Its sister show, She-Ra: Princess of Power was still in its first season. The Christmas special reunited twins He-Man and She-Ra in their biggest joint adventure since The Secret of the Sword. It commences with Queen Marlena reflecting nostalgically about Christmases on Earth, and, after a series of misadventures set in motion by Orko, climaxes with a confrontation that pits He-Man, She-Ra and Skeletor (whose bone-hard heart has been briefly softened by a pair of Earthling children, a peculiar pup, and Christmas Spirit) against Hordak and Horde Prime.

=== Masters of the Universe film (1987) ===
She-Ra was originally intended to appear in Masters of the Universe and concept art by production designer William Stout was even commissioned, but director Gary Goddard felt it would be best to concentrate on He-Man for the first film. (It would be the only film.) She-Ra was planned to appear in the sequel; the sequel film was cancelled and rewritten into Cyborg, with She-Ra's equivalent character, Nady Simmons, portrayed by Deborah Richter.

=== Robot Chicken ===
She-Ra appears in a 2007 skit on the Adult Swim series Robot Chicken, where she is bothered by several male characters needing help to save other characters not realizing that She-Ra was on her period. Adora, fed up with being bothered, angrily turns into She-Ra and makes quick work of all the villains so "she can get some fucking sleep".

=== Masters of the Universe Classics (2008–2015) ===
She-Ra appears in the Mattel Masters of the Universe toyline launched in 2008, which attempts to create a new canon by merging selected portions of existing media together with new story elements. The story is told via a combination of mini-comics packaged with the action figures and the biographies printed on the toy packaging.

In this version of events, Hordak arrived on Etheria after being trapped in the dimension of Despondos by King Grayskull. His apprentice Skeletor kidnaps Adora and sends her to Etheria. After being raised by the Horde and becoming She-Ra (as in the cartoon series), she eventually returns to Eternia with several of her friends and allies, to help He-Man defeat Hordak, who has overthrown King Randor and conquered the planet. She-Ra follows her brother into space on their New Adventures to the planet Primus, and together they battle the Horde Empire's ruler Horde Prime. At some point in the future, she would end up returning in the new, villainous persona of Despara upon becoming possessed by Horde Prime.

=== DC Comics (2012–2020) ===
In December 2012, She-Ra appeared in her own DC Comics series as a lead-in to her introduction into the He-Man and the Masters of the Universe comic series. Adora's introduction is an updated retelling of her classic origin story. Although she was still kidnapped as a baby and raised by the Horde, Adora's personality and life are made much more violent and tragic when compared to her animated counterpart.

Rather than being a kind woman who has been under the mind control of Shadow Weaver, Despara (Adora's Horde name) is a brutal force captain who is fully aware of the Horde's cruel and evil nature and, although she has some reservations, serves them willingly. Rather than having already taken over the planet of Etheria, instead, Despara leads the Horde in taking over Eternia and driving He-Man, King Randor and the Masters into hiding so as to rebel against the Horde. Due to a connection between herself and Teela, Adora begins to break free of the Horde's will, and begins her journey into becoming She-Ra.

=== He-Man: The Most Powerful Game in the Universe (2012) ===
She-Ra appeared in the 2012 handheld video game He-Man: The Most Powerful Game in the Universe.

=== Masters of the Universe: Revolution (2024) ===
In Masters of the Universe's third part, Masters of the Universe: Revolution, she appears first in a flashback in the third episode when she was kidnapped by Hordak as a baby, and in her Despara persona during the fifth episode's epilogue. She is voiced by Grey DeLisle in her Despara form.

In the comic book tie-in Masters of the Universe: Revolution #4, published by Dark Horse Comics, Despara appears at the end of the story, a variant cover features the phrase "Who is Despara?".

=== Bloons TD 6 ===
In Bloons TD 6, She-Ra appears as a guest playable skin for original character Adora. In the tie-in storymode, She-Ra gets transported to the world of the game and turned into a monkey, allying with the other monkeys against the Bloons.

=== Masters of the Universe film (2026) ===
She-Ra appears in the second mid-credits scene of the 2026 Masters of the Universe film. She is filmed facing away from the camera and holding the Sword of Protection. A character off screen refers to her as "Force Captain Adora", to which she replies "No, not anymore". The character is played by English actress Lauren Saliu in an uncredited appearance.

=== She-Ra live action television series ===
On September 13, 2021, Amazon announced that a live action She-Ra series is in development with DreamWorks Animation serving as an executive producer as the series will be a new, standalone story and will not be connected to the 2018 animated show. In October 4, 2024, it was announced that Heidi Schreck signed to write the series. Despite being produced by Amazon MGM Studios, who also produced the 2026 Masters of the Universe film adaptation, it is unknown if the series will be connected to the movie.
