= He-Man and the Masters of the Universe (2021 TV series) =

American animated television series

- Promotional poster
- Genre: Action adventure; Science fantasy; Superhero
- Based on: Masters of the Universe by Mattel
- Developed by: Rob David
- Voices of: Yuri Lowenthal; David Kaye; Antony Del Rio; Kimberly Brooks; Judy Alice Lee; Tom Kenny; Benjamin Diskin; Grey Griffin; Trevor Devall; Roger Craig Smith; Fred Tatasciore
- Opening theme: "The Power Is Ours" by Ali Dee
- Ending theme: "He-Man and the Masters of the Universe" by Michael Kramer
- Composer: Michael Kramer
- Country of origin: United States
- Original language: English
- No. of seasons: 3
- No. of episodes: 26

Production
- Executive producers: Adam Bonnett; Rob David; Christopher Keenan; Frederic Soulie
- Producer: Susan Corbin
- Running time: 25–28 minutes
- Production company: Mattel Television

Original release
- Network: Netflix
- Release: September 16, 2021 – August 18, 2022

He-Man and the Masters of the Universe is an American animated superhero television series developed by Rob David and is a reimagining of the 1983 animated series of the same name. The series premiered on Netflix on September 16, 2021. A second season was released on March 3, 2022. The third and final season was released on August 18, 2022.

== Plot ==
On the planet Eternia, an amnesiac Prince Adam has been separated from his father King Randor during the treachery of his uncle Keldor. Upon being part of a Tiger Tribe with his best friend Krass'tine, Prince Adam later finds a Power Sword that transforms him into He-Man, the most powerful man in the universe.

With Cringer, Krass'tine, and their new allies Teela and Duncan, known as Man-At-Arms, they work to fight the forces of Keldor upon his transformation into the evil Skeletor, and his minions Evil-Lyn, Beast Man, and Trap Jaw.

== Voice cast ==
=== Main ===
- Yuri Lowenthal as Prince Adam / He-Man
  - Max Stubington as young Prince Adam
- Kimberly Brooks as Teela / Sorceress
- Judy Alice Lee as Krass'tine / Ram-Ma'am / Rampage
- David Kaye as Cringer / Battle Cat
- Antony Del Rio as Duncan / Man-at-Arms

=== Villains ===
- Benjamin Diskin as Keldor / Skeletor
- Roger Craig Smith as Kronis / Trap Jaw
- Grey Griffin as Evelyn / Evil-Lyn
- Trevor Devall as R'Qazz / Beast Man / Skele-Beast
- Kevin Conroy as Hordak

=== Supporting ===
- Fred Tatasciore as King Randor and Baddrah
- Tom Kenny as Ork-0 and various RK drones
- Zeno Robinson as King Stratos
- Stephen Fry as Man-E-Faces
- Bobcat Goldthwait as Gary the Dragonfly
- Dee Bradley Baker as Webstor
- Kevin Smith as Tri-Klops
  - Stephanie Sheh as Justine, Tri-Klops' host

=== Minor ===
- Yuri Lowenthal as Tuvar
- Kimberly Brooks as Teela-Na / Eldress
- Alan Oppenheimer as King Grayskull
- George Takei as Mer-Man
- Wallace Shawn as Orko the Great
- Roger Craig Smith as General Dolos
- Grey Griffin as Mo'squita-ra
- Max Mitchell as Kitty

== Episodes ==
=== Series overview ===
Season	Episodes	Originally released
1	10	September 16, 2021
2	8	March 3, 2022
3	8	August 18, 2022

=== Season 1 (2021) ===
No. overall	No. in season	Title	Directed by	Written by	Original release date
1	1	"The Sword of Grayskull"	Ricardo Curtis; Armen Melkonian	Bryan Q. Miller	September 16, 2021
Young witch Teela works with her friend Duncan as apprentices for criminals Kronis and Evelyn, who are planning to steal the Sword of Power from King Randor's castle in the city of Eternos, in order to access the legendary power of Castle Grayskull. Upon retrieving the sword, Teela receives a telepathic message from a mysterious being who tells her to get the sword to the "champion". Teela is taken prisoner by the Tiger Tribe colony and is visited by Adam, an amnesiac city teenager who grew up in the woods with his best friend Krass and father figure Cringer. Teela convinces Adam to help her get the sword out of the village. But when Evelyn and Kronis track them down, Adam attempts to fight back with the Sword. But suddenly, the cuff on his wrist merges with the sword, restoring it to its full power. When Adam speaks the incantation: "By The Power of Grayskull!" the sword transforms him into a large, muscular man infused with the power of Grayskull.
2	2	"The Power of Grayskull"	Matt Ahrens	Bryan Q. Miller	September 16, 2021
The transformed Adam manages to dispatch the hunter drones with a powerful attack, but he passes out and transforms back to normal. Duncan betrays Kronis and Evelyn, and helps Adam, Teela, Krass, and Cringer escape from the duo in a transport and stop to make repairs in the canyons. When the others try using the sword, Adam manages to wake up and tells them the sword needs to be recharged back at Castle Grayskull. Krass dubs Adam's transformed persona "He-Man". Meanwhile, Kronis and Evelyn encounter Keldor, who has stolen the souls of several of Randor's troops. Keldor tells them the location of Grayskull and tells them of his past with the castle, he once tried to take it over, but was cursed with the dark magic Havoc, which is slowly killing him, and has seared the flesh of his left hand, leaving it skeletal, thus the need for stealing soul energy. Kronis reprograms more drones to find Adam's group. Meanwhile, Adam wishes to know more about his past, and is comforted by Krass. The next morning, the reprogrammed drones find and attack them, but Keldor arrives and rescues them, then introduces himself as Adam's long lost uncle.
3	3	"The Heirs of Grayskull"	Lubomir Arsov	Bryan Q. Miller	September 16, 2021
After Keldor steals the sword from him, and Kronis and Evelyn bury them under a rock gathering, Adam and Teela lead the crew to Castle Grayskull after Keldor and his goons. Through mystical echoes, the group discovers how Keldor got his bony hand and how the Sword and castle chose Adam to be its champion when he was a little kid. With the sword recharged, Adam once again transforms into He-Man, but he gets into a duel with his powerful uncle, Adam sees his friends are captured by Evelyn and Kronis and Keldor threatens Adam to give him the power of Grayskull or he will use Havoc to turn Adam's friends into monsters, just like him.
4	4	"The Champions of Grayskull"	Matt Ahrens	Bryan Q. Miller	September 16, 2021
After freeing Teela, Krass, Duncan and Cringer, Adam shares the power of Grayskull with them to turn them into Sorceress, Ram-Ma'am, Man-at-Arms and Battle Cat, respectively. Adam fights Keldor, while the others take on Kronis, Evelyn, and a shadow copy of Battle Cat. After the heroes are victorious, Keldor grows mad to the point where he believes his curse is a blessing in disguise, and tries to gain more Havoc power from the castle, warping his scepter into the Ram-Headed Havoc Staff. He jumps into the beam of Havoc, and drags Kronis and Evelyn along with him, apparently vaporizing them all. Instead, unbeknownst to the new Champions of Grayskull, the fortress banishes the villains into Snake Mountain, the capital of the Fright Zone. Keldor's additional exposure to Havoc expands the effects of his curse and drives him even more insane, mutating him into a muscular but grotesque skeletal warrior named Skeletor, who brands Evelyn and Kronis his minions, sets up an evil lair in Snake Mountain with his Havoc magic and plots to destroy all his enemies rather than conquer them.
5	5	"We Have the Power"	Armen Melkonian	Heath Corson	September 16, 2021
Teela struggles with her decision to join Adam and his team on their new adventures, especially when she struggles to solve the mystery of her possible connection to the Sorceress of Grayskull. Meanwhile, Skeletor uses his Havoc powers to reanimate the remains of old monsters underneath Snake Mountain, turning them into undead horned beasts called Battle Bones to distract the Champions and Randor's army so that he can kidnap General Dolos and have Kronis impersonate him to get Kirbinite - the metal the Sword of Power is forged from, and the key component needed to upgrade Skeletor's Havoc Staff and share its dark magic with his minions.
6	6	"Orko the Great"	Lubomir Arsov	Bryan Q. Miller	September 16, 2021
Duncan upgrades and restarts an RK drone that saved him (during We Have the Power); unfortunately, thanks to an old data cog Duncan installs, the drone thinks he is a great sorcerer called Okro the Great, who once served on Grayskull's court. The drone runs away from the Masters, later presenting himself as an obstacle on their next mission outside of Castle Grayskull. Meanwhile, using his hologram technology, Kronis impersonates General Dolos in order to sneak back into Eternos and steal the Kirbinite needed for Skeletor's plan.
7	7	"He-Man, the Hunted"	Matt Ahrens	Amanda Deibert	September 16, 2021
While checking in on the Tiger Tribe, Adam, and Krass get captured by R'Qazz, a Beastopoid poacher who took away Cringer's original claws, gave him his name, who has also brainwashed the other green tigers Katura, Bash, and Prowler with his mind-control whip. While the teens free themselves from a trap set by R'Qazz, they argue about their roles. Eventually, Cringer helps Adam get the sword back and discovers he and Krass can transform without Adam rallying them. R'Qazz is beaten and his tiger slaves are set free, but Krass chooses to remain in the Tiger Tribe village and protect it from poachers rather than go back to Grayskull with the others.
8	8	"The Calm Before the Storm"	Armen Melkonian	Keely MacDonald	September 16, 2021
Evelyn and Kronis hire Cringer's arch-enemy R'Qazz to help them overthrow Skeletor. Using the Kirbinite, Skeletor begins upgrading the villains' weapons, conjuring a storm made of Havoc energy that threatens Eternos as a byproduct. The storm forces King Randor and He-Man to work together to survive. Adam learns why his father didn't look for him after Keldor took him to find Grayskull. Adam transforms into He-Man in order to dispel the storm, revealing his identity to Randor. Randor wants Adam to surrender Grayskull's power. Adam retreats and suggests the Masters take on Keldor alone. Duncan and Teela try to find a way to track down Keldor's magical source and put an end to his threat, while Eldress has a heart-to-heart chat with the young Sorceress. In the end, Skeletor's upgrades are completed, and Evelyn senses that Teela has found them.
9	9	"Cry Havoc, Part 1"	Lubomir Arsov	Peter Binswanger	September 16, 2021
The Masters, minus Ram Ma'am, charge into Skeletor's lair. Skeletor uses his Havoc powers to turn his minions into the Dark Masters: Evil-Lyn, Trap-Jaw and Beast Man. While the Masters fight the Dark Masters one-on-one, their new powers make them an equal match for the team. He-Man battles Skeletor, but Skeletor manages to break the Sword of Power in half, cutting the Masters off from the Power of Grayskull. Things only get worse when Skeletor brainwashes General Dolos and takes control of the Red Legion. The episode ends with the Masters being dunked in a pit of pure Havoc to corrupt them.
10	10	"Cry Havoc, Part 2"	Matt Ahrens	Bryan Q. Miller	September 16, 2021
Eldress reveals to the Masters that they can still channel their comradery to escape, and manage to fight their corruption as Krass and Orko free them from the Havoc pit. Duncan manages to reforge the Sword of Power with the leftover Kirbinite Skeletor left behind, which restores their powers. When the Dark Masters try to pull a coup on Skeletor, he reveals he tricked his minions, foreseeing their betrayal; the Kirbinite was to ensure he could use his new mind-control powers to force them to obey his every command as he can with the Red Legion. The newly repowered Masters manage to use the Sorceress' newfound ability of teleportation to head to the city and save it. While Orko saves the king, the Masters take on the Dark Masters and try destroying Skeletor's staff, while discovering that their upgraded weapons allow them to combine their powers. However, it fails and King Randor, Teela, and Orko are forced to stay in Eternos in hiding. To keep Castle Grayskull safe, Eldress taps into Grayskull's powers and teleports it and the other Masters to an unknown destination. Skeletor takes the throne of Eternos, as the Dark Masters and every mind-controlled soldier in Eternos bow to him.

=== Season 2 (2022) ===
No. overall	No. in season	Title	Directed by	Written by	Original release date
11	1	"The World Above"	Armen Melkonian	Bryan Q. Miller	March 3, 2022
Castle Grayskull re-emerges in Avion, but tensions arise when the Masters are confronted by the hot-headed and arrogant king of the Avion, Stratos. With Eldress missing, Adam challenges Stratos to a sacred Avion trial to protect the Castle. Meanwhile, Teela, Randor, and Ork-0 sneak around the city, looking for "the King of the Lower Wards," Man-E-Faces.
12	2	"The World Below"	Lubomir Arsov	Bryan Q. Miller	March 3, 2022
Teela, Randor, and Ork-O attempt to recruit Man-E-Faces and his subjects to help fight against Skeletor and his army as Beast Man attempts to track them down and capture them. Meanwhile, Adam, Krass, Duncan, Cringer, and Stratos arrive at Snake Mountain to find the first piece of the "Sigil of Hsss," a deadly weapon capable of re-animating the long-dead Snake Men. When Skeletor and Evil-Lyn arrive to claim it for themselves, Stratos' lack of power puts him at a disadvantage against Skeletor. When Evil-Lyn stops him from killing Stratos and teleports them away, he exiles her from his service and strips her of her connection to Havoc.
13	3	"Eternia 2000"	Lubomir Arsov	Lila Scott	March 3, 2022
Skeletor discovers the second piece of the Sigil of Hsss in the Royal Vault, a train containing the Kingdom's greatest secrets, and goes after them the Masters arrive to stop them. Things get harder as the bandit Mosquita-ra arrives. When Stratos' hotdogging causes Skeletor to escape with the piece, He-Man outs him from the team. Meanwhile, in the lower wards, Ork-O faces off against Tri-Klops, an invisible, mind-controlling robot created by Trap-Jaw that was sent to capture Randor.
14	4	"A Very Hungry Dragonfly"	Ricardo Curtis	Amanda Deibert	March 3, 2022
Adam, Cringer, and Teela are on a mission to recover the last piece of the Sigil of Hsss, which has been eaten by Gary, a giant, Havoc-mutated dragonfly, who is being chased by Evelyn. She is seeking to claim the piece and strip the Havoc from Gary's body to restore her connection to the Power of Havoc.
15	5	"Meanwhile..."	Matt Ahrens	Peter Binswanger	March 3, 2022
During the events of "A Very Hungry Dragonfly," Duncan is back at Castle Grayskull, attempting to use the "Proto-Havoc" in a Sigil of Hsss piece along with the power of Grayskull to bring Eldress back from limbo, but he accidentally places the Castle in a cosmic lockdown. Things get worse when Skeletor accidentally uses an ancient Trollian wish stone to teleport himself to the Castle. Now Duncan must undo the lockdown and defeat Skeletor.
16	6	"Divided We Stand"	Matt Ahrens	Bryan Q. Miller	March 3, 2022
A paranoid Krass attempts to discover the origins of the Ram Stone in her helmet and is accompanied by Stratos, who is searching for new members of his "Heroic Warriors" when they are attacked by Webstor. Meanwhile, back at Castle Grayskull, the rest of the Masters attempt to keep the two pieces of the Sigil of Hsss from completing themselves, as Man-E-Faces and Ork-0 sneak around Eternos, looking for Skeletor's fragment of the Sigil of Hiss.
17	7	"The Battle of Avion"	Armen Melkonian	Bryan Q. Miller	March 3, 2022
Avion is under siege by Skeletor and his forces, who attack the city to claim Castle Grayskull's pieces of the Sigil of Hsss. While the reunited Masters of the Universe attempt to keep Skeletor's forces at bay using their combined powers, Stratos and His Heroic Warriors (Consisting of Mosquita-ra, Gary the Dragonfly, and Webstor) arrive to help keep the Red Legion at bay. After a tiring battle, He-Man manages to use the combined powers of the Masters to break Skeletor's Havoc Staff, robbing the Dark Masters of their powers and sucking Skeletor into a deadly vortex of his own power, but not before he uses his powers to link his soul to Krass' helmet.
18	8	"The Fifth Nemesis"	Lubomir Arsov	Bryan Q. Miller	March 3, 2022
The Masters are celebrated heroes for freeing the Kingdom from Skeletor's reign and are now ready to live in the Castle with King Randor. However, Krass has reservations about their new arrangement and making matters worse, Skeletor's lingering ghost haunts her, prodding and pushing her into her worst fears in an attempt to manipulate her into betraying her friends in the exchange that he will resurrect her dead parents. Krass initially resists Skeletor's manipulations, but after she overhears a conversation with Adam telling Randor that she would be a terrible ambassador to the Wilds (in which he was going to ask Randor to adopt her), an emotionally dejected and betrayed Krass accepts the deal, and steals the last fragment of the Sigil of Hsss, races off to Castle Grayskull, and empowers herself with the damaged Havoc Staff, transforming into Rampage, Dark Master of Destruction. He-Man tries to stop Rampage, but her augmented powers fueled by her embittered rage make her too powerful for him, and she knocks him off the island with her new Dark Master Strike. Now alone, Krass and Skeletor recombine the Sigil of Hiss, unleashing the Undead Snake Men onto Eternia.

=== Season 3 (2022) ===
No. overall	No. in season	Title	Directed by	Written by	Original release date
19	1	"The Haunting of Castle Grayskull"	Matt Ahrens	Bryan Q. Miller	August 18, 2022
After recombining the Sigil of Hsss and reviving the Snake Men, Krass and Skeletor's ghost plan to seek out the remains of King Grayskull, having need of his body to resurrect Skeletor. Meanwhile, He-Man regroups with the remaining Masters of the Universe to try to beat them to the location before they find it. After splitting into groups to cover more ground, Adam, Cringer, and Randor race to the Mystic Mountains to search for clues to the Sigil of Hsss' creation, while Duncan and Teela fly to Levitathe, the frozen wasteland of the Merfolk to search for the Tomb, and encounter the revived Elderess.
20	2	"Frozen Solid"	Armen Melkonian	Amanda Deibert	August 18, 2022
After discovering that King Grayskull was the creator of the Sigil of Hsss and the Power of Havoc, Adam, Cringer, and Randor attempt to head to the Tomb of Grayskull, but are confronted by Rampage and Skeletor, who want Randor's knowledge of the Tomb's location. Meanwhile, Duncan, Teela, and Elderess face off against the Monstroids, the guardians of the Tomb, and Mer-Man, the first and last of the Mer-Folk.
21	3	"Wrath of the Mer-Man"	Matt Ahrens	Bryan Q. Miller	August 18, 2022
Teela, Duncan, and Elderess are captured by the Mer-Man, who tells them the Merfolk nearly went extinct after the Great War and reveals that Elderess killed King Grayskull when his lust for Havoc drove him to evil. Meanwhile, He-Man and Rampage race to the tomb, only to face the restored Dark Masters, now aided by a super-powered ship created by Trap-Jaw and Evil-Lyn, called the Dread Wing.
22	4	"The Tomb of Grayskull"	Lubomir Arsov	Matthew Drdek	August 18, 2022
Inside of the Tomb of Grayskull, He-Man attempts to keep Rampage and Skeletor from stealing King Grayskull's body, while the other Masters attempt to hold off both the Dark Masters and Mer-Man. However, in order to escape, Krass uses the Sigil to call all of the Snake Men to the Tomb and they combine into the gigantic King Hsss. Swallowed by the monster and dunked into the Proto-Havoc in its stomach, He-Man gives into his fears and the pain from Krass' betrayal, and transforms into the Dark Master, "Havoc-Man".
23	5	"A Leap of Faith"	Armen Melkonian	Julie Benson	August 18, 2022
With Adam transformed into the childish but destructive "Havoc-Man," Teela, Duncan, Cringer, and Randor seek to use the Sword of Power to restore him, needing the help of Stratos and his Heroic Warriors subdue him long enough to let Teela unshackle him from his delusions. Meanwhile, Skeletor plans to resurrect himself using King Grayskull's body and the Power of Havoc, while Krass starts to shake away from Skeletor's manipulations, after witnessing her foster brother turn to the dark side.
24	6	"In-Can't-Ation"	Ricardo Curtis	Shawna Benson	August 18, 2022
With Adam still afflicted from his exposure to Proto-Havoc in "The Tomb of Grayskull", Ork-O travels to an alternate dimension to see Orko the Great, who gives him a "True Self" spell to cure Adam, but the spell breaks before it can cure Adam, causing it to turn him, Duncan, Teela, and Cringer into random creatures, switches their bodies and even makes them 2-D. Tri-Klops arrives and attempts to take Adam over to steal the Sword of Power. Meanwhile, Evil-Lyn confronts Rampage at Castle Grayskull, managing to add extra doubt into Krass's mind about Skeletor's plans. In the end, Ork-0 manages to use real magic to restore Adam, Duncan, Teela, and Cringer while Tri-Klops is taken by Duncan, who kindly repairs him. Ork-O tells Orko the Great how they could fix the mistakes and keep trying. However, Skeletor's resurrection is complete, and he repairs his Havoc Staff, ready to set his plan into motion.
25	7	"The Beginning of the End, Part 1"	Matt Ahrens; Ricardo Curtis	Bryan Q. Miller	August 18, 2022
With Skeletor reborn and more powerful than ever, the Masters converge on a way to keep him from spreading the Power of Havoc across Eternia. As He-Man and Battle Cat storm Castle Grayskull, aided by a remorseful Krass, to defeat Skeletor and a Havoc-mutated Beast-Man, while Man-At-Arms, The Sorceress, Ork-O, Tri-Klops, Evil-Lyn, and Trap-Jaw work on a device to keep Skeletor's mass Havoc wave from spreading across the world. But Skeletor prevails after threatening to kill Krass, forcing Adam to give up the Sword in exchange for her life.
26	8	"The Beginning of the End, Part 2"	Lubomir Arsov	Bryan Q. Miller	August 18, 2022
With the Sword of Power in his possession, Skeletor combines it with the power of the Havoc Staff to become the Cosmic Terror, a gigantic winged dragon-like kaiju of cosmic power. Flying from the remains of Castle Grayskull, he absorbs the Powers of both Grayskull and Havoc from the Masters, Dark Masters, their vehicles, and the Havoc pools all over Eternia to rip open a portal to the Heart of the Universe, to change the universe into his twisted image. Drained of their powers, the Masters begin to lose hope, until Krass comes to self-enlightenment, letting go of her selfish desires and acknowledging the Masters as family. With that realization, Krass suddenly develops a power of her own, with the other Masters coming to realizations of who they are, resulting in them unlocking the power of the Universe within, restoring their Master forms. Traveling to the Heart, they face off against Skeletor, who holds onto the upper hand, until Adam manages to remove the Sword of Power from the Terror, and combined with the Masters' Power, He-Man defeats Skeletor and reverts him to the powerless Prince Keldor, allowing him to be imprisoned in the Royal Dungeons. However, he warns them a massive threat is on the way. With Skeletor defeated and the Havoc Staff missing, the Masters plan to rebuild Castle Grayskull, and Adam spreads the Power of Grayskull across Eternia for everyone to use. However, Beast Man finds the Havoc Staff in Levitathe, and in the Fright Zone, Evil-Lyn (who had managed to keep her Havoc powers due to being dragged away from the battle) discovers her winged bat construct, Horakoth, is actually her father, Hordak, a harbinger who seeks to claim her as his equal for bringing the coming of his people.

== Production ==
On December 18, 2019, Netflix announced two new Masters of the Universe projects to be in development: an adult-oriented anime series described as a direct sequel to the 1983 He-Man and the Masters of the Universe titled Revelation, and a CGI series aimed at children. Pre-production was handled by House of Cool in Canada while animation services was done by CGCG Inc. in Taiwan.

== Release ==
He-Man and the Masters of the Universe was released on September 16, 2021, on Netflix. A trailer was released on August 19. The second season was released on March 3, 2022. The third season was released on August 18, 2022. The entire series was released on DVD on October 10, 2023, from Mill Creek Entertainment.

== Reception ==
The show received generally positive reviews from critics. On Rotten Tomatoes it has an 83% approval based on reviews from 6 critics, with an average rating of 6.8/10, based on 5 critic reviews.

Joel Keller of Decider.com gave it a positive review and wrote: "What this version of He-Man and the Masters of the Universe lacks in nostalgia it more than makes up for with smart dialogue, good CGI, and its ability to start building the world of Eternia from scratch with a compelling story."
