= The Secret of the Sword =

1985 US animated film directed by Bill Reed and Gwen Wetzler

- Theatrical release poster
- Directed by: Ed Friedman; Lou Kachivas; Marsh Lamore; Bill Reed; Gwen Wetzler
- Written by: Larry DiTillio; Bob Forward
- Produced by: Arthur H. Nadel; Lou Scheimer
- Starring: John Erwin; Melendy Britt; Alan Oppenheimer; Linda Gary; George DiCenzo; Erika Scheimer; Lou Scheimer
- Edited by: Joe Gall
- Music by: Erika Lane; Shuki Levy; Haim Saban
- Production company: Filmation
- Distributed by: Atlantic Releasing
- Release date: March 22, 1985
- Running time: 91 minutes
- Country: United States
- Language: English
- Budget: $2 million
- Box office: $6.5 –7.5 million

The Secret of the Sword, also known as He-Man and She-Ra: The Secret of the Sword, is a 1985 American animated superhero film produced by Filmation. Although released before the series She-Ra: Princess of Power began, the film is a compilation of the first five episodes with minor editing. The film's production was part of a trend of theatrically released animated films created by producers of TV shows and toys during the 1980s. It is part of the same continuity as the He-Man and the Masters of the Universe cartoon series, and was created by the same Filmation production team and cast. It was the first He-Man theatrical film, and the first theatrical release to feature She-Ra or any Masters of The Universe/Princess of Power characters.

Six months after its March, 1985 theatrical release, The Secret of the Sword was televised in episodic form, during the premiere week of the She-Ra TV series, from September 9 to 13, 1985. Within the series, the storyline covered by the film is known as "The Sword of She-Ra".

== Plot ==
On Eternia, the Sorceress of Castle Grayskull is awakened by the magical Sword of Protection, which leads her to a portal known as a Time Gate. She sends Prince Adam and Cringer through the portal to find the person destined to possess the Sword.

Adam and Cringer arrive in the other dimensional world of Etheria, which is ruled by the Horde, an intergalactic army. Adam eventually stands up to some soldiers of the Horde and defeats them with the help of archer Bow. Bow and his friend Kowl are members of the Great Rebellion. They take Adam and Cringer to the Rebellion's base in the Whispering Woods.

While taking away villagers, the Horde, led by Force Captain Adora, are attacked by the Rebels, aided by Adam and Cringer in their secret identities as He-Man and Battle Cat. The Sword eventually glows in Adora's presence, revealing that it belongs to her. This distraction allows the Horde to knock He-Man out and capture him.

At the Horde's prison complex, Adora interrogates He-Man. She believes that the Rebels are evil and that the Horde are benevolent rulers, despite not knowing much about life outside their base. He-Man dares her to see what life on Etheria is really like. The Rebels get into the prison to find him, only to get captured. Kowl manages to free He-Man, who liberates the others and destroys the prison. Meanwhile, Adora witnesses the cruelties citizens endure at the hands of the Horde. Furious, she confronts the Horde's leader Hordak. However, Horde magic-user Shadow Weaver enchants her into a sleep that makes her forget what she recently learned.

He-Man sneaks into the Horde base looking for Adora, who once again thinks that he is evil and arrests him. Hordak then confines He-Man in the energy chamber of the Magna-Beam, a willpower-fueled transporter, to charge it overnight. That night, Adora has nightmares about He-Man's fate and hears the Sorceress' voice. Talking through the Sword, she reveals that He-Man is Adora's twin brother. When the twins were born to King Randor and Queen Marlena, Eternia was invaded by the Horde. Unable to defeat the combined might of the Eternian army and the magic of Grayskull, Hordak plotted to demoralize them by kidnapping the newborn royals. Although the kidnapping was interrupted by Man-At-Arms, Hordak escaped with Adora. The Sorceress could not discover which dimension Hordak fled to, so she cast a spell that wiped all memory of Adora from all Eternians except for herself, Man-At-Arms, Randor and Marlena. Thus Adam was raised unaware of Adora's existence.

Adora breaks Shadow Weaver's spell and follows the Sorceress's instructions to use the Sword's magic and transform into the superpowered She-Ra, Princess of Power. After she revives He-Man, the pair destroy the Magna-Beam and flee on Adora's horse Spirit, who in She-Ra's presence is transformed into Swift Wind, a winged unicorn. At the Rebel camp, the Rebellion accept Adora into their ranks. Meanwhile, Queen Angella, rightful ruler of the kingdom of Bright Moon, is being held prisoner on nearby Talon Mountain. As He-Man and She-Ra, the twins free Angella and reunite her with her people.

Adam takes Adora back to Eternia to reunite with their parents. Hordak pursues them through the Time Gate, and on Eternia he goes to his old base and discovers that his old pupil Skeletor is in charge there. Magically disguised as cooks and with Hordak hidden inside a cake, Skeletor and his henchmen kidnap Adora. Skeletor then forces Hordak back to Etheria, planning to ransom Adora himself. However, Adora outwits her captors and, reclaiming her sword, deals with them as She-Ra.

Adora decides to return to Etheria to aid the Rebellion, a decision accepted by her family. The Sorceress sends Adora and Spirit back to Etheria, saying that they can use the Sword to summon aid from Eternia should they ever need it. Adam and Cringer tag along, offering to help the Rebellion. As He-Man and She-Ra, the twins help the Rebels liberate Bright Moon. He-Man and Battle Cat then return to Eternia, while She-Ra and Swift Wind resolve to stay until Etheria is free.

== Cast ==
- John Erwin as Prince Adam / He-Man, Beast Man
- Melendy Britt as Princess Adora / She-Ra, Catra, Hunga the Harpy
- Alan Oppenheimer as Skeletor, Man-at-Arms, Cringer / Battle Cat, Bald Rebel, Chef Alan
- Linda Gary as Teela, Queen Marlena, Sorceress of Castle Grayskull, Shadow Weaver, Glimmer, Madame Razz
- George DiCenzo as Bow, Hordak
- Erika Scheimer as Queen Angella, Imp
- Lou Scheimer as King Randor, Swift Wind, Kowl, Mantenna, Horde Trooper, Kobra Khan, Leech, Trap Jaw, Tri-Klops, Broom, Sprag, Sprocker, Garv the Innkeeper, Bard, Messenger, Horde Computer (as Erik Gunden)

== Comic book ==
A comic book, He-Man and She-Ra, Secret of the Sword, was published in 1985 by Mattel Toys as part of their "The Secret of the Sword Sweepstakes." The comic was handed out at theaters prior to seeing the film. The story runs six pages and recaps the film.

In the UK, a film novelisation was published by Ladybird Books.

== Reception ==
On the review aggregator website Rotten Tomatoes, 60% of 5 critics' reviews are positive. Janet Maslin of The New York Times and Charles Solomon of the Los Angeles Times likened the film to a Saturday morning children's cartoon extended to feature film length. Maslin in particular cited the film's plot as "complicated but entirely predictable". The film was, however, a box-office success, grossing more than three times its $2 million budget; according to Lou Scheimer, the movie made over $7.5 million before finishing its theatrical run.

== Kidtoon Films release ==
The film was picked up by Kidtoon Films as part of its weekend matinee program twenty-one years after its release. It returned to theaters on May 6, 2006 and closed on May 28, 2006. It replaced the original Dolby Stereo soundtrack with Dolby Digital and DTS tracks, and even though it was shot on film, was shown digitally.

== DVD release ==
The film was released on DVD in the United States on a two-disc set titled "The Best of She-Ra: Princess of Power" collection on July 18, 2006 by BCI Entertainment’s Ink & Paint brand, which also included five episodes from the series. The set was also released in the United Kingdom by Right Entertainment/Universal in September 2006.

The film was re-released as a stand-alone release in the United Kingdom on July 16, 2007, and in the United States on May 6, 2008.

The film was released as part of the He-Man and the Masters of the Universe: The Complete Series DVD from Universal Pictures Home Entertainment.

== See also ==
He-Man & She-Ra: A Christmas Special
