= He-Man and the Masters of the Universe (2012 DC comic) =

2012 DC Comics comic book series

- He-Man and the Masters of the Universe Volume 1

Publication information
- Publisher: DC Comics
- Schedule: Monthly
- Genre: Science fiction
- Publication date: June 2012 – March 2017; July 2018 – May 2020
- No. of issues: 75

He-Man and the Masters of the Universe is a comic book series by DC Comics based on the Masters of the Universe. The series began with a digital mini-series, followed by a six-issue standard mini-series. Two ongoing series, He-Man and the Masters of the Universe and He-Man: The Eternity War, were produced and are now concluded. There have also been two crossover mini-series with the DC Universe, and one with ThunderCats. Several origin one-shots and collected edition graphic novels have also been produced.

== The series ==
=== Masters of the Universe ===
In June 2012, DC began publishing a weekly digital-first title, Masters of the Universe, with the first chapter written by Geoff Johns, with art by Howard Porter and John Livesay. The title explored the world of Eternia and tied directly into DC Comics' print title, He-Man and the Masters of the Universe. The digital series lasted eight issues and ended in December 2012.

=== He-Man and the Masters of the Universe (Volume One) ===
In July 2012, a six-issue mini-series started titled He-Man and the Masters of the Universe. The series lasted until January 2013. In the story, Skeletor succeeds in capturing Castle Grayskull but ultimately fails at unlocking the secret of its power. In the course of the adventure, Skeletor murders the Sorceress before being brutally defeated by He-Man and transported to the side of an unseen villain who reveals he has been manipulating Skeletor all along.

=== He-Man and the Masters of the Universe (Volume Two) ===
A new series running from June 2013 to January 2015 started with the aftermath of the first volume. 19 issues were released, consisting of 3 story arcs of 6 issues and one prelude to the next ongoing series. At the start of the first arc, a celebration of the Sorceress’ life is interrupted by an invasion of the Horde, the army of Hordak himself. Leading the charge is a human woman called Despara. He-Man's friend Teela soon recognized Despara as her forgotten childhood friend Adora, who is destined to become She-Ra, the Princess of Power. The second arc, entitled "What Lies Within" (issue 7–12) sees King Randor lead He-Man, Teela, Stratos, Battle Cat and Moss Man into Subternia to attempt to bring the Sorceress back to life. Along the way they face the reborn Snake Men. The third arc, "The Blood of Grayskull" (issues 13 to 18) explains the origin of She-Ra. The final issue, #19, features a flashback to the youth of Prince Adam and serves as a prelude to the Eternity War.

=== DC Universe vs. Masters of the Universe ===
Starting August 28, 2013, a six-issue mini-series titled DC Universe vs. Masters of the Universe began publishing. It takes place between Volume two issues six and seven. Skeletor, last seen at the end of Volume one, has been sent to Earth by his mysterious ally. Once there, he sets a plan in motion to siphon off Earth's core magic. He-Man and the Masters follow Skeletor to Earth but are confronted with the heroes of the DC Universe, primarily the various factions of the Justice League.

=== Origin one-shots ===
A series of one-shots detailing the origins of different characters have also been published. The origin stories of Skeletor, He-Man and Hordak have been explored.

=== He-Man: The Eternity War ===
A second ongoing series, that continues from Volume two, started publishing in December 2014, and ended in February 2016, after 15 issues.

=== He-Man / ThunderCats ===
In 2016, DC Comics released a crossover with ThunderCats. The six-issue crossover lasted from October 2016, to March 2017. Unlike the various abovelisted series and one-shots—all of which take place in the same continuity as one another, a continuity in which neither Battle Cat nor Swiftwind can talk—He-Man/ThunderCats takes place in a separate universe, one in which Battle Cat can talk.

=== Injustice vs. Masters of the Universe ===
Continuing the continuity that began with He-Man/ThunderCats, this is a six-part series that crosses over with DC Comics' Injustice Storyline, the first issue of which was released 18 July 2018 and the sixth of which was released on 2 January 2019. Taking place after the events of He-Man/ThunderCats and after Superman's ending in Injustice 2, after defeating the robotic imposter and seizing control of Eternia, He-Man and his allies are approached by the Insurgency to help defeat Superman's despotic rule.

=== He-Man and the Masters of the Multiverse ===
A 6-part miniseries, with the first issue released on November 20, 2019. The threat of Anti-Eternia has spread across the multiverse, conquering every version of Eternia with a ragtag group of surviving alternate He-Men banding together to save the Multiverse by recruiting the one person that could possibly help them achieve victory, Anti-Eternia's version of Prince Keldor, the man that would become Skeletor.

== Collected editions ==
The series has been collected in the following trade paperbacks:

| Title | Release date | Pages | Collected material | ISBNT |
|---|---|---|---|---|
| He-Man and the Masters of the Universe Volume 1 | July 10, 2013 | 160 pages | He-Man and the Masters of the Universe (Volume one) #1–6 & Masters of the Universe (digital) #1 | 978-1401240226 |
| He-Man and the Masters of the Universe Volume 2: Origins of Eternia | February 26, 2014 | 144 pages | Masters of the Universe: Origin of Skeletor, Masters of the Universe: Origin of He-Man, Masters of the Universe: Origin of Hordak & Masters of the Universe (digital) #2-7 | 978-1401243128 |
| He-Man and the Masters of the Universe Volume 3 | August 19, 2014 | 160 pages | He-Man and the Masters of the Universe (Volume two) #1–6 & Masters of the Universe (digital) #8 | 978-1401247195 |
| DC Universe Vs. Masters of the Universe | September 2, 2014 | 160 pages | DC Universe Vs. Masters of the Universe #1–6 & DC Comics Presents #47 | 978-1401247201 |
| He-Man and the Masters of the Universe Volume 4: What Lies Within | March 3, 2015 | 144 pages | He-Man and the Masters of the Universe (Volume two) #7-12 | 978-1401250690 |
| He-Man and the Masters of the Universe Volume 5: The Blood of Grayskull | June 23, 2015 | 144 pages | He-Man and the Masters of the Universe (Volume two) #13-19 | 978-1401253394 |
| He-Man: The Eternity War Volume 1 | October 7, 2015 | 144 pages | He-Man: The Eternity War #1–6 | 978-1401258481 |
| He-Man: The Eternity War Volume 2 | May 3, 2016 | 208 pages | He-Man: The Eternity War #7-15 | 978-1401261283 |
| He-Man / Thundercats | July 5, 2017 | 160 pages | He-Man / Thundercats #1–6 | 978-1401269159 |
| Injustice Vs. Masters of the Universe | April 23, 2019 | 160 pages | Injustice Vs. Masters of the Universe #1–6 | 978-1401288372 |
| He-Man and the Masters of the Multiverse | September 1, 2020 | 144 pages | He-Man and the Masters of the Multiverse #1–6 | 978-1779503213 |

Most of the series was also compiled into one omnibus, excluding the latest mini-series (Injustice vs. Masters of the Universe & He-Man & the Masters of the Multiverse):

| Title | Release date | Pages | Collected material | ISBNT |
|---|---|---|---|---|
| He-Man and the Masters of the Universe Omnibus | February 26, 2019 | 1,496 pages | DC Comics Presents #47, He-Man and the Masters of the Universe (Volume one) #1–6, He-Man and the Masters of the Universe (Volume two) #1–19, He-Man: The Eternity War #1–15, DC Universe Vs. Masters of the Universe #1–6, He-Man / Thundercats #1–6, Masters of the Universe: Origin of Skeletor, Masters of the Universe: Origin of He-Man, Masters of the Universe: Origin of Hordak & Masters of the Universe (digital) #1–8, Special Masters of the Universe preview, and Masters of the Universe (1982) #1–3. | 978-1401290498 |
