= Princess of Power =

Mattel toyline

- Type: Dolls/Action Figures
- Invented by: Mattel
- Company: Mattel
- Country: United States
- Availability: 1984–present

Princess of Power (sometimes abbreviated as POP and informally referred to as She-Ra, after the lead heroine) is a toyline created by Mattel. Among others, it features the characters of She-Ra and Catra on planet Etheria. With its launch in 1984, the toyline spawned a variety of products, including three lines of fashion action figures. The Princess of Power logo and characters are currently used by Mattel as part of the Masters of the Universe Classics toyline.

== The Toys ==
In 1984, Mattel and Filmation decided to diversify the Masters of the Universe line beyond its traditional realm of "male action" in the hopes of bringing in a young female audience as well. To accompany the Filmation animated series, Mattel created a new line of toys aimed at girls - Princess of Power - with the feminine warrior-woman She-Ra (twin sister of Masters' main hero He-Man) as its main heroine. The toyline featured almost exclusively female characters, all of whom featured an emphasis on hair and clothing, with "real" hair and partially soft-goods costumes. Essentially, the line attempted to fuse the appeal of Masters of the Universe with Mattel's most long-standing success, Barbie. Like its predecessor Masters of the Universe, the POP toy line actually lasted longer than the She-Ra: Princess of Power cartoon series itself. Most of the females were heroic except for Catra, who acted as She-Ra's main nemesis in the attached minicomics, and Entrapta who followed her schemes.

== Mattel Princess of Power Vintage Toys (1984-1987) ==
Wave 1 / 1984
Name	Tagline	Allegiance	Type
She-Ra	Princess Adora Becomes She-Ra, Most Powerful Woman in the Universe!	The Great Rebellion	Action Figure
Bow	Special Friend Who Helps She-Ra!	The Great Rebellion	Action Figure
Glimmer	The Guide Who Lights the Way!	The Great Rebellion	Action Figure
Kowl	The Know-It Owl!	The Great Rebellion	Action Figure
Angella	Angelic Winged Guide!	The Great Rebellion	Action Figure
Frosta	Ice Empress of Etheria!	The Great Rebellion	Action Figure
Castaspella	Enchantress Who Hypnotizes!	The Great Rebellion	Action Figure
Double Trouble	Glamorous Double Agent!	The Great Rebellion	Action Figure
Catra	Jealous Beauty!	The Evil Horde	Action Figure
Swift Wind	Beautiful Horse Spirit, Becomes Magical Flying Unicorn!	The Great Rebellion	Creature
Arrow	True Blue Horse Flies BOW to Victory!	The Great Rebellion	Creature
Enchanta	Beautiful Swan "Flies" She-Ra and her Friends on Amazing Adventures!	The Great Rebellion	Creature
Storm	Flies CATRA to Exciting Adventures!	The Evil Horde	Creature
Crystal Castle	Shimmmering Castle of Fantasy and Fun for SHE-RA and her Friends!	The Great Rebellion	Playset

Wave 2 / 1986
Name	Tag Line	Allegiance	Type
Starburst She-Ra	The Most Powerful Woman in the Universe!	The Great Rebellion	Action Figure
Flutterina	Beautiful Lookout "Flies" with Fluttering Wings!	The Great Rebellion	Action Figure
Mermista	Mist-i-fying Mermaid!	The Great Rebellion	Action Figure
Peekablue	Watchful "Feathered" Friend!	The Great Rebellion	Action Figure
Perfuma	Scent-sational Flower Maiden!	The Great Rebellion	Action Figure
Sweet Bee	Honey of a Guide!	The Great Rebellion	Action Figure
Scratchin' Sound Catra	Jealous Beauty!	The Evil Horde	Action Figure
Entrapta	Tricky Golden Beauty!	The Evil Horde	Action Figure
Crystal Swift Wind	Magnificent Crystal Unicorn "Flies" She-Ra to Adventure!	The Great Rebellion	Creature
Crystal Moonbeam	Winged Stallion Protects Crystal Castle at Night!	The Great Rebellion	Creature
Crystal Sun Dancer	Lovely Winged Protector of Crystal Castle by Day!	The Great Rebellion	Creature
Sea Harp	Musical Sea Horse Carries She-Ra and her Friends to Adventure!	The Great Rebellion	Creature
Butterflyer	Winged Collector's Case for She-Ra doll and her Friends!	The Great Rebellion	Creature
Clawdeen	Glamorous Cat Carries Catra to Adventure!	The Evil Horde	Creature
Crystal Falls	Refreshing Water Wonderland for She-Ra and her Friends!	The Great Rebellion	Playset
Fantastic Fashions - Deep Blue Secret	Ocean Blue Outfit with a Secret Map of the Sea!	The Great Rebellion	Accessories
Fantastic Fashions - Fit to be Tied	Glamorous Gown with Life-Saving Scarf!	The Great Rebellion	Accessories
Fantastic Fashions - Flight of Fancy	Pretty Pantaloons Plus Magical Sword and Winged Shield!	The Great Rebellion	Accessories
Fantastic Fashions - Flower Power	Garden Party Gown with "Powerful" Surprise Flowers!	The Great Rebellion	Accessories
Fantastic Fashions - Hold on to Your Hat	Pretty Hat Becomes a Secret Shield	The Great Rebellion	Accessories
Fantastic Fashions - Ready in Red	Furry Winter Outfit Hides a Powerful Suit of Armor!	The Great Rebellion	Accessories
Fantastic Fashions - Rise & Shine	Lacy Lounging Gown Hides a Sparkly Suit of Armor!	The Great Rebellion	Accessories
Fantastic Fashions - Veils of Mystery	Layers of Veils Hide a Secret Sword!	The Great Rebellion	Accessories

Wave 3 / 1987
Name	Tag Line	Allegiance	Type
Bubble Power She-Ra	The Most Powerful Woman in the Universe!	The Great Rebellion	Action Figure
Loo-Kee	Hides & "Sees" All in Etheria!	The Great Rebellion	Action Figure
Netossa	Captivating Beauty!	The Great Rebellion	Action Figure
Spinnerella	Dizzying Defender	The Great Rebellion	Action Figure
Shower Power Catra	Jealous Beauty!	The Evil Horde	Action Figure
Royal Swift Wind	Mighty "Flying" Unicorn Carries She-Ra to Adventure!	The Great Rebellion	Creature
Silver Storm	Silver Storm "Flies" Catra to Mischievous Adventures!	The Evil Horde	Creature
Fantastic Fashions - Blue Lightning		The Great Rebellion	Accessories
Fantastic Fashions - Colorful Secret		The Great Rebellion	Accessories
Fantastic Fashions - Frosty Fur		The Great Rebellion	Accessories
Fantastic Fashions - Heart of Gold		The Great Rebellion	Accessories
Fantastic Fashions - Hidden Gold		The Great Rebellion	Accessories
Fantastic Fashions - Reflections in Red		The Great Rebellion	Accessories
Fantastic Fashions - Secret Messenger		The Great Rebellion	Accessories
Fantastic Fashions - Windy Jumper		The Great Rebellion	Accessories

== Mattel Princess of Power Unreleased Toys (1985-1987) ==
The following appear in toy catalogues but were never released.

Unreleased/Prototypes
Name	Tag Line	Alliegiance	Type
Starla	Bright & Beautiful Leader with Star Glitter Backpack	The Great Rebellion	Action Figure
Tallstar	Make Lovely Lookout "Grow"	The Great Rebellion	Action Figure
Jewelstar	Fold Hidden Beauty into "Jewel"	The Great Rebellion	Action Figure
Glory Bird	Flying Friend and Protector, Make his Wings Flap!	The Great Rebellion	Creature
Bubble Carriage		The Great Rebellion	Vehicle

== Cartoon Series (1985-87) ==
The animated series She-Ra: Princess of Power was produced by Filmation and made its television debut in 1985. Since the male members of the Evil Horde had been released as Masters of the Universe toys after the He-Man animated series had ended, they were made the main antagonists, with Catra and Entrapta from the POP toyline joining their ranks.

Etheria is ruled by Hordak and the Evil Horde. Raised by Hordak, but actually the long-lost daughter of King Randor and Queen Marlena of Eternia, and twin sister of Prince Adam / He-Man, Princess Adora joins the Great Rebellion to fight against the oppressive Horde. Princess Adora possesses a magic sword, and when she holds it aloft with her right hand and says the magic words, "For the honor of Grayskull... I AM SHE-RA!!!" she is transformed into She-Ra, "The Most Powerful Woman in the Universe." She-Ra is a beautiful blonde woman dressed in a white dress and a red cape, with a golden tiara on her head.

== Mattel Masters of the Universe 200X ==
Only one Princess of Power character was redone as an action figure for the new Masters of the Universe line in 2002-04: She-Ra, herself.

Released as an exclusive in 2004, this new She-Ra figure was made to appeal to fans of both the original and the new toylines, as well as fit in more closely with the other redesigned Masters characters. The new She-Ra still had the rooted, combable hair, but all of her clothing (except for her cape) was made out of molded plastic instead of cloth (unlike the original fashion action figure, who had both a cloth cape and skirt).

== Mattel/Super7 Masters of the Universe Classics (2008-2020) ==
This new line of collector-oriented figures features previously released characters with "classic" retro sculpting and levels of articulation unprecedented for Masters of the Universe toys, and exclusively available online from Mattel's website mattycollector.com. As with the 200X toyline they are once again sculpted by the Four Horsemen, but are predominantly based on the original 1980's line of figures. Super7 took over the manufacture of the line in 2017, under licence from Mattel. The line plans to eventually include characters from all aspects of the Masters of the Universe franchise, including She-Ra (Princess of Power).

The first Princess of Power figure was Princess Adora, as revealed at the 2009 San Diego Comic-Con, and was first made available in January 2010. Since then, Adora's alter-ego She-Ra has been released in the Classics line along with Princess of Power male lead Bow and chief villainess Catra. Although they made their original toy appearances in Masters of the Universe, She-Ra villains Hordak, Leech, Mantenna and Grizzlor are also available. New additions to the line from Princess of Power included Bubble Power She-Ra and her beloved steed Swift Wind, and many more characters were released during the following years.

List of POP toys in MOTU Classics
Year of release	Name	Tag Line	Allegiance	Type
2009	Hordak	Ruthless Leader of the Evil Horde	The Evil Horde	Action figure
2010	Adora	Leader in the Great Rebellion	The Great Rebellion	Action Figure
2010	She-Ra	Most Powerful Woman in the Universe	The Great Rebellion	Action Figure
2010	Grizzlor	Hairy Henchman of the Evil Horde	The Evil Horde	Action Figure
2011	Bow	Special Friend Who Helps She-Ra	The Great Rebellion	Action Figure
2011	Map of Etheria (came with Preternia Disguise He-Man)	Beautiful Planet of Despondos		Poster
2011	Catra	Jealous Beauty	The Evil Horde	Action Figure
2011	Supergirl vs. She-Ra	The Maid of Might/Most Powerful Woman in the Universe		Gift Set
2011	Leech	Evil Master of Power Suction	The Evil Horde	Action Figure
2011	Hurricane Hordak	Ruthless Leader with the Wicked Whirling Weapons	The Evil Horde	Action Figure
2011	Bubble Power She-Ra	Most Powerful Woman in the Universe	The Great Rebellion	Action Figure
2011	Swiftwind (aka Swift Wind)	Beautiful Horse, Spirit, Becomes Magical Flying Unicorn!	The Great Rebellion	Creature
2012	Star Sisters (Starla, Tallstar & Jewelstar) (with Glory Bird)	Bright and Beautiful Leader/Lovely Lookout/Hidden Beauty	The Great Rebellion	Gift Set
2012	Shadow Weaver	Mistress of Dark Magic	The Evil Horde	Action Figure
2012	Horde Prime	Supreme Ruler of The Horde Empire	The Evil Horde	Action Figure
2012	Frosta	Ice Empress of Etheria	The Great Rebellion	Action Figure
2013	Netossa	Captivating Beauty	The Great Rebellion	Action Figure
2013	Octavia	Wicked Tentacle-Swinging Warrior	The Evil Horde	Action Figure
2013	Castaspella	Enchantress Who Hypnotizes	The Great Rebellion	Action Figure
2013	Mantenna	Evil Spy with the Pop Out Eyes	The Evil Horde	Action Figure
2013	Horde Troopers	Evil Mechanical Enforcers of Hordak	The Evil Horde	Gift Set
2013	Kowl (included with End of Wars Weapons Pak)	The Know-It Owl	The Great Rebellion	Figure/Accessories
2013	Sea Hawk	Heroic Etherian Pirate	The Great Rebellion	Action Figure
2014	Glimmer	The Guide Who Lights the Way!	The Great Rebellion	Action Figure
2014	Map of The Horde Empire (came with Unnamed One)	Tyrannical Galactic Rulers		Poster
2014	Kowl (cartoon colours) & Loo-Kee	The Know-It Owl/Hides and Sees All in Etheria	The Great Rebellion	Action Figures
2014	Scorpia	Stinging Horde Enforcer	The Evil Horde	Action Figure
2014	Modulok	Evil Beast of the Thousand Bodies	The Evil Horde	Action Figure
2014	Double Mischief (aka Double Trouble)	Glamorous Double Agent	The Great Rebellion	Action Figure
2014	Hordak (cartoon colours) (with Imp)	Evil Leader of the Horde Invasion	The Evil Horde	Action Figure
2014	Imp as Treasure Chest	Evil Shapeshifting Spy	The Evil Horde	Accessory
2014	Flutterina	Beautiful "Flying" Lookout	The Great Rebellion	Action Figure
2014	Madame Razz (with Broom)	Magical Witch of Whispering Woods	The Great Rebellion	Action Figure
2014	Entrapta	Tricky Golden Beauty	The Evil Horde	Action Figure
2014	Sweet Bee	Honey of a Guide	The Great Rebellion	Action Figure
2014	Light Hope	Magical Protector of the Crystal Castle	The Great Rebellion	Action Figure
2014	She-Ra (Galactic Protector)	Galactic Protector	Galactic Guardians	Action Figure
2014	Arrow	True Blue Horse Flies Bow to Victory	The Great Rebellion	Creature
2014	Mermista	Mermaid Friend of She-Ra	The Great Rebellion	Action Figure
2014	Spinnerella	Dizzying Defender	The Great Rebellion	Action Figure
2015	Huntara	Courageous Silaxian Warrior	None	Action Figure
2015	Angella	Angelic Winged Guide	The Great Rebellion	Action Figure
2015	Peekablue	Watchful Feathered Friend	The Great Rebellion	Action Figure
2015	Multi-Bot	Evil Robot of the Thousand Bodies	The Evil Horde	Action Figure
2015	Perfuma	Scent-Sational Flower Maiden	The Great Rebellion	Action Figure
2015	Calix	Evil Horde Rock Man	The Evil Horde	Action Figure
2015	Buzz-Saw Hordak	Ruthless Leader with the Blaster Blade	The Evil Horde	Action Figure
2015	Dragstor	Evil Transforming Warrior Vehicle	The Evil Horde	Action Figure
2016	Vultak	Evil Flying Zookeeper	The Evil Horde	Action Figure
2016	Despara	Powerful Force Captain of the Evil Horde	The Evil Horde	Action Figure
2016	General Sunder	Heroic Former Horde General	The Great Rebellion	Action Figure
2017	Horde Trooper	Evil Mechanical Enforcers of Hordak	The Evil Horde	Action Figure
2018	Granita	Heroic Comet Combatant	Comet Warriors	Action Figure
2018	Dylamug	Evil Robot with Endless Expressions	The Evil Horde	Action Figure

In 2017 Super7 took over the production of Masters of the Universe Classics and released two more characters from Princess of Power, Granita and Dylamug.

== Super7 He-Man and the Masters of the Universe (2017-2019) ==
In 2017 Super7 took over the production of the He-Man and the Masters of the Universe 7" scale toyline. Included for the first time are cartoon-accurate Hordak and Tung Lashor figures from the She-Ra animated series.

List of POP toys in He-Man and the Masters of the Universe
Year of release	Name	Tag Line	Allegiance	Type
2017	Hordak (with Imp)	Ruthless Leader of the Evil Horde	The Evil Horde	Action Figure
2018	Tung Lashor	Evil Tongue Shooting Creature	The Evil Horde	Action Figure
2018	Mantenna	Evil Spy with the Pop-Out Eyes	The Evil Horde	Action Figure
2018	She-Ra	The Most Powerful Woman in the Universe	The Great Rebellion	Action Figure Figure
2018	Grizzlor	Hairy Henchman of the Evil Horde	The Evil Horde	Action Figure
2019	Modulok	Evil Beast of a Thousand Bodies	The Evil Horde	Action Figure
2019	Shadow Weaver	Evil Mistress of Dark Magic	The Evil Horde	Action Figure

== Super7 Vintage-style Masters of the Universe (2018-2019) ==
In 2018 Super7 released new action figures in the style of the original 5.5 inch Mattel MOTU toys, including characters from the She-Ra: Princess of Power cartoon.

List of POP toys in Vintage-style Masters Of The Universe
Year of release	Name	Tag Line	Allegiance	Type
2018	She-Ra	The Most Powerful Woman in the Universe	The Great Rebellion	Action Figure
2018	Hordak (cartoon style)	Ruthless Leader of the Evil Horde	The Evil Horde	Action Figure
2018	She-Ra & Hordak (cartoon style)	The Most Powerful Woman in the Universe & the Ruthless Leader of the Evil Horde	The Great Rebellion & The Evil Horde	Gift Set
2019	Shadow Orko (from the episode "Shades of Orko")	Heroic Court Magician	Heroic Warriors	Action Figure
2019	Shadow Weaver	Evil Mistress of Dark Magic	The Evil Horde	Action Figure

== Mattel Princess of Power 2016 Exclusive ==
In July 2016 Mattel released a new 11 inch She-Ra doll. Exclusively available from MattyCollector, she has rooted hair, includes 3 fabric outfits (Filmation, Classic Toy, and Adora), 2 Swords of Protection, and comes with a mini-comic.
