= He-Man as a gay icon =

He-Man's costume includes a harness, which was considered homoerotic in the 1980s. This aspect of He-Man's appearance has been cited as an example of queer coding.

He-Man, a fictional superhero from the sword and sorcery franchise Masters of the Universe created by Mattel, has often attracted queer interpretations and discussions over his status as a gay icon. His first appearance was in the 1982 comics included with his toy figures. The animated television series He-Man and the Masters of the Universe, which aired from 1983 to 1986, focused on the character and established traits that would remain consistent in future installments of the franchise.

Homosexual readings of He-Man have been discussed by cultural critics and academics, having also been referenced in other forms of media. He-Man has been noted for the homoeroticism and gay subtext surrounding his character. While the original series aired during a period of public suppression of homosexuality, elements of queer coding have been noted since He-Man's inception. Discussions have focused on his adherence to various gay stereotypes regarding his physical appearance, including connections to LGBTQ subcultures such as gay clone culture. His double life, being both He-Man and Prince Adam, has been viewed as reminiscent of closeted gay men. He-Man's close relationships and intense rivalries with other male characters—such as Skeletor and Man-at-Arms—have also been highlighted.

Since his creation, He-Man has become a gay icon and amassed an LGBTQ following, especially amongst gay men; the character has also been noted for his sex appeal to that demographic. According to various insiders and employees, Mattel is aware of He-Man's perceived gay icon status and his following in the LGBTQ community, as well as the perception of the character as a gay man.

== Background ==
He-Man is the protagonist of the Masters of the Universe toy line, created by Mattel, with his first appearance being during 1982 in minicomics packed with the toys. The cartoon series He-Man and the Masters of the Universe, based on Mattel's toyline, first aired in 1983 and would go on to air 130 episodes, concluding its run in 1985. The series established He-Man as the alter ego of Prince Adam of Eternia, who is the son of King Randor and Queen Marlena. He-Man and his allies battle against the forces of the villainous Skeletor and strive to protect the secrets of Castle Grayskull from his clutches.

The original series aired during the presidency of Ronald Reagan (1981–1989), (Note: American journalist and author Randy Shilts has noted Reagan's presidency for its rise in homophobia. According to Shilts, the 1980 Republican Party presidential primaries in preparation for the presidential election appeared to be a "contest to see which candidate could be the most staunchly antigay". Reagan himself criticized the gay rights movement, describing it as "asking for recognition and acceptance of an alternative lifestyle which I do not believe society can condone, nor can I". Reagan's response to the HIV/AIDS epidemic, which initially affected primarily gay men, was criticized as being inadequate and ineffective.) which film scholar Jake Pitre acknowledges as a period in which producers attempted to "defuse any possible queer readings" of their cartoons. Regarding this, Anthony Gramuglia of Comic Book Resources stated that because censors often prevented explicit representation of LGBTQ characters, creators often had to rely on queer coding, giving characters camp qualities to implicitly indicate their LGBTQ status.

== Homosexual reading ==
According to professor Jeffery P. Dennis, cartoons are "unusually amenable to subtexts that hint at or even celebrate same-sex desire", and "often produce a tacit validation of same-sex romantic or domestic relationships, even when the animators have no such interest". Dennis says that even in cartoons that lack a same-sex pairing, readers may interpret a queer identity in a character such as He-Man, who "was muscular and never dated girls". Professor Jes Battis also said the original cartoon series "dealt in themes of queerness and secrecy", while Syfy writer Jordan Zakarin described it as "the gayest show that has ever been on TV".

=== Appearance ===
Literature professor Michael G. Cornelius has argued that homoeroticism is prevalent in the Masters of the Universe franchise, highlighting how He-Man's muscular body was the focal point of the franchise, and was highly objectified. Cornelius describes He-Man's body as reminiscent of the Castro clone (or gay clone) look prominent in the United States when the original cartoon aired. Gay clone culture was characterized by a butch and masculine look, and a muscular physique; alongside dressing like a blue-collar worker. Cornelius noted that both the He-Man franchise and gay clone culture "fetishized […] the male form".

Concerning the attention afforded to the male physical form, alongside its fetishization, Cornelius has written that within Masters of the Universe, the body acts as the "key signifier in the fashioning of male identity". Similarly, in gay clone culture the male body is viewed simultaneously as "object of desire and object of subjective fashioning", with gay clone culture requiring a muscular physique to "manoeuvre successfully". Cornelius believes that while He-Man was likely not created to reflect this aspects of gay clone culture, both said culture and the Masters of the Universe franchise display similar social anxieties and desires regarding the male body that differ from the "larger heteronormative continuum present in society at the time".

When it comes to specific aspects of the character's wardrobe, Cornelius further argues that many aspects of Prince Adam's and He-Man's individual outfits conform to various gay stereotypes. Fetish wear designer David Chlopecki describes Prince Adam as a "very gay guy", highlighting him wearing lavender, pink, and white spandex, as well as his "blond pageboy haircut". Slate's Sam Anderson—who described the original series as containing "accidental homo-eroticism"—also discussed Adam's clothing, particularly his "lavender stretch pants, furry purple Ugg boots, and a sleeveless pink blouse".

Regarding the character's appearance after transforming, NPR described He-Man's outfit as adding to the show's homoerotic subtext given its resemblance to leather subculture. Specifically, discussions have highlighted He-Man's harness, which was considered homoerotic imagery in the 1980s. Relating to this, Cornelius notes how the Village People modelled their outfits after the gay clone culture of New York and argues that He-Man, with his "leather strapping and 'furry underwear' ", would have "blended right in".

=== Dual identity ===
When Prince Adam says the phrase, "By the power of Grayskull, I have the power", he transforms into He-Man, the strongest man in the universe, and gains a variety of abilities; the phrase also allows his feline companion Cringer to simultaneously transform into Battle Cat. The only other people aware of his secret identity were Orko, Duncan / Man-At-Arms, and the Sorceress of Castle Grayskull who gave Adam his powers.

According to The Guardian, the character became "renowned within the LGBTQ+ community" because they "saw parallels" in the secret life of Prince Adam. According to Battis, Adam's need to "hide his true identity as [He-Man]" is one of the show's key queer aspects. Highsnobiety's Sophia Atkinson noted his double life reflects the "difficulties of living as a gay man".

British newspaper The Daily Telegraph said the character's dual identity represents a man's struggle to accept his sexuality; Prince Adam is closeted and has a secret while He-Man is "out-and-proud". Writing for The Johns Hopkins News-Letter, Matt Johnson described the series' depiction of He-Man as a "thinly veiled treatise on the state of gay male sexuality in the eighties". Johnson views Adam as a sexually repressed, closeted gay man whose transformation into He-Man represents his pent-up frustrations reaching their peak.

=== Relationships ===
While He-Man's sexuality has never been directly addressed, across various media in the franchise, the character has never shown romantic interest in women. The homoeroticism of He-Man's relationship with Man-at-Arms was highlighted in a re-cut trailer uploaded to YouTube titled "Brokeback Snake Mountain". Men's Health has noted how He-Man's relationships with both Skeletor and Man-At-Arms contain a "will-they-or-won't-they tension". Adam B. Vary said the original cartoon series contains gay subtext, which the live-action movie Masters of the Universe (1987) almost turns into explicit text.

== Gay icon status ==
=== Gay fandom ===
He-Man's homoeroticism and implied homosexuality resulted in the character and show drawing a queer audience when the cartoon first aired, with the character being now viewed as a gay icon. (Note: Sources that cite He-Man as a gay icon:) Wired magazine's Lorenzo Fantoni believes that He-Man becoming a gay icon was inevitable, given that he is a "muscular blonde" who fights with "hairy men and equally muscular enemies". Author and professor Jarrett Neal described the original cartoon as having featured such "blatant homoerotic imagery [that] Mattel can [receive] credit for captivating an entire generation of gay men"; Neal further stated he identified with Prince Adam and wished to attain the "physicality and confidence of He-Man". Men's Health identified gay men as one of the three core groups of adult collectors of He-Man toys, alongside bodybuilders and law-enforcement officers.

=== Sex appeal ===
In conjunction with his status as a gay icon, He-Man has also been acknowledged to be a sex symbol for gay men. LGBTQ lifestyle magazine Out described the original series as "one of the gayest ... cartoons of all time", writing that the 1987 film "turn[ed] an entire generation of boys at least a little gay". Instinct magazine's Gerald Biggerstaff described the original cartoon as being quite popular with gay men who grew up in the 1980s and 1990s, and that for many of them, He-Man "prompted [their] gay awakenings".

In 2003, HX Magazine editors compiled a list of must-see television series with attractive male leads; He-Man was the only animated character to make the list, being described as the "object of all our childhood wet dreams". (Note: He-Man appeared in the list as himself, based on his appearance from the 2002 reboot.) British magazine Gay Times listed He-Man as a cartoon character their editors were attracted to while growing up, noting Dolph Lundgren's depiction of him in the live-action film. In the same publication, actor Andrew Hayden-Smith said he realized he was gay while playing with his He-Man figure as a child, being attracted to the character's physique—particularly his pecs.

=== Response from creators ===
According to Erika Scheimer, lesbian daughter of Filmation co-founder Lou Scheimer, the company welcomed gay artists. She said that members of the studio "long[ed] to see themselves onscreen", often joking that He-Man is gay.

Mark Morse, Mattel's director of global marketing from 2008 to 2017, stated in 2018 that the idea of representing him as openly gay in a future franchise had not been discussed at the company. That same year, the company released the Laughing Prince Adam figure, which "seemed to nod to" gay interpretations of He-Man. Morse, who created early prototypes, stated Mattel wanted to ensure the figure would not be viewed as offensive to the LGBT+ community.

In an interview with gay online magazine Queerty, Rob David and Tim Sheridan, who work on Masters of the Universe: Revelation, discussed the character's homoeroticism and gay fanbase. Sheridan, a gay man who is one of the show's writers, believes that the original show's themes led to He-Man fostering a gay fanbase despite not being openly gay. He also said He-Man is coded in such a way in Revelation that his character can be interpreted in numerous ways, which Sheridan believes can bring people together. According to David, who is an executive producer of Revelation and Mattel's Vice President of Creative Content, Mattel is "very comfortable" with He-Man's gay audience and the perception of the character as a gay man.

== Influence on other media ==
A drawing by Benoit Prevot, auctioned off at the Skeletor Saves event, depicts He-Man and Skeletor about to have sex. Their relationship has often been described as homoerotic.

ND Stevenson, the creator of the 2018 series She-Ra and the Princesses of Power, has also called He-Man—alongside She-Ra—a gay icon, He-Man's LGBTQ fanbase has been credited as helping provide support for the inclusion of openly queer characters in the She-Ra reboot.

In Dan Fishback's Thirtynothing, a 2011 play focused on gay artists who died and the AIDS crisis, Fishback discusses watching the cartoon in his childhood. The show's opening credits are shown, followed by footage of a 1989 demonstration organized by the AIDS advocacy group ACT UP. Jayson A. Morrison discusses how in doing so, Fishback connects Prince Adam's transformation into the powerful He-Man by holding up a sword and reciting a phrase to LGBTQ individuals "who [gain] extraordinary powers as activists".

In April 2011, David Mason, Brian Moylan, and Bradford Shellhammer held the "Skeletor Saves" charity art-auction event, the proceeds of which went to the Ali Forney Center, an LGBTQ community center helping homeless LGBTQ youth. Inspired by Mason's childhood love for the He-Man franchise and Skeletor, the auction included the work of fashion designers Helmut Lang and Marc Jacobs. Writing for Canadian LGBT-focused Xtra Magazine, Helen Whithead stated the art show allowed artists to "explore the sexy, camp side of the homoerotic He-Man muscle fest". Many of the works submitted to the event included portrayals of He-Man in gay and not safe for work (NSFW) situations, including him being seduced by Skeletor and the two characters having sex.

In 2017, British company Moneysupermarket.com created an advertisement that showed He-Man and Skeletor embracing and dancing, which Joe Glass of Bleeding Cool described as "on the homoerotic side".

Following the 2005 release of Brokeback Mountain, which focuses on the emotional and sexual relationship between two cowboys, multiple parodies of the film's trailer were created and uploaded on YouTube. According to Jennifer Malkowski, these fake trailers "amplif[y] queer subtext" found within works, with one such video titled "Brokeback Snake Mountain" referencing a subtextual romance between He-Man and Man-at-Arms.
