= Jack Radcliffe =

American gay pornographic actor (born 1960)

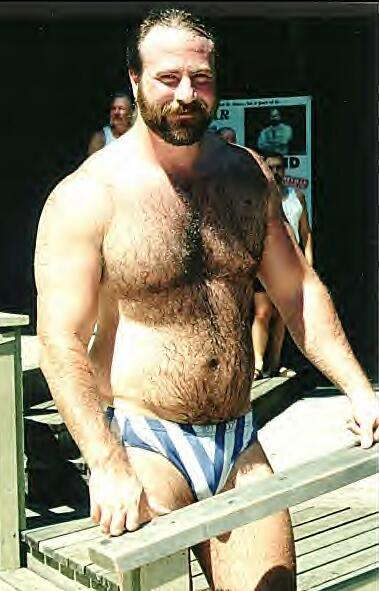
- Radcliffe at the Bear Bust '99 event
- Born: Frank Martini; July 5, 1960 (age 65); Staten Island, New York
- Occupation: Pornographic film actor
- Years active: 1989–2008
- Height: 6 ft 2 in (1.88 m)

Jack Radcliffe (born Frank Martini; July 5, 1960) is an American former pornographic film actor. Radcliffe is considered a pornographic icon, and in particular, an icon of gay bear subculture and its physical aesthetics.

== Early life ==
Radcliffe was born in Staten Island, New York in 1960. He grew up with his parents and two siblings, a sister and a younger brother. Radcliffe attended school in Staten Island until leaving to attend college at Buffalo State University in Buffalo, New York, earning two Bachelor's degrees in mathematics and physics. He came out in 1983 and later moved to Denver, Colorado that summer.

== Career ==
Radcliffe was "discovered" in 1989 by photographer Chris Nelson. Nelson featured Radcliffe (as "Jack Radcliff") in his coffee table book The Bear Cult, which helped establish the iconic imagery associated with the nascent gay "bear" subculture. He debuted in issue No. 9 of Nelson and Nelson's partner Richard Bulger's foundational publication Bear Magazine and continued to appear in the publication as a model for the magazine's company, Brush Creek Media, after moving to San Francisco in 1989. Nelson worked as the magazine's photographer, while Bulger served as the magazine's publisher.

During the same photoshoot, Radcliffe also shot his first solo adult video. Continuing to work as a regular model for Brush Creek Media, Radcliffe quickly became popular in the bear community. Several years later, Nelson and Bulger contacted Radcliffe concerning interest in shooting non-solo films for Brush Creek Media. Radcliffe appeared in seven adult films with Brush Creek Media and later appeared in additional films with Butch Bear and Massive Studio. He retired from adult acting after performing in Massive Muscle Bears with Massive Studio.

== Other ventures ==
Radcliffe worked as the chief financial officer of a software consulting company during the late 1990s and early 2000s. He currently works as a realtor.

== Legacy and cultural impact ==
Radcliffe is often cited as an enduring iconic representation (if not the most iconic representative) of the bear aesthetic in pornography, gay culture, and at large. He has been described as "the Marilyn Monroe of bear culture," a "poster boy of bear culture," and a "reigning bear icon." In a 2009 list of bear icons, LGBTQ pop culture website Queerty stated, "In the bear porn industry, Radcliffe is God. It’s easy to see why– if Plato were a bear, this would be his ideal."

Despite this, Radcliffe has downplayed his iconography within bear culture.

Radcliffe was the most featured cover model in the history of Bear Magazine. In his 2001 forward for author and academic scholar Les K. Wright's The Bear Book II: Further Readings in the History and Evolution of a Gay Male Subculture, former editor-in-chief of Drummer Jack Fritscher noted that Radcliffe remained Brush Creek Media's top box office earner and described him as an icon for the company. Wright also described Radcliffe as the first to embody the "bear beauty" aesthetic with his specifically marketed films. Conversely, Radcliffe has also been specifically identified as an example of the "muscle-bear" body type that later emerged in bear culture, contributing to a more muscular standard of beauty, seemingly in conflict with the "normal," "average," or fat ("chub") aesthetic origins of the bear community.

== Filmography ==
| Year | Title | Production company |
|---|---|---|
| 1989 | Original Bear 3 – Uncut Footage | Brush Creek Media |
| 1996 | Bear Classic | Brush Creek Media |
| 1996 | Bear Sex Party | Brush Creek Media |
| 1997 | Leather Bears at Play | Brush Creek Media |
| 1998 | Bear: Palm Springs Vacation | Brush Creek Media |
| 1999 | Big Bear Trucking Co. | Brush Creek Media |
| 2000 | Big Bear Trucking Co. 2 | Brush Creek Media |
| 2003 | Hard Mechanics | Massive Studio |
| 2006 | Erotic Spotlight Series 1 | Butch Bear |
| 2006 | Erotic Spotlight Series 3 | Butch Bear |
| 2008 | Massive Muscle Bears | Massive Studio |

== See also ==
- List of male performers in gay porn films
