= Swish (slang) =

Slang

Swish is a US English slang term for effeminate behavior and interests (camp), emphasized and sanctioned in gay male communities prior to the Stonewall riots. This behaviour is also described as being nelly in British English, and both terms are often considered to be derogatory.

Being swish stereotypically includes a "sashaying" walk, and the use of falsetto voices, feminine pronouns, and superlatives. According to Martin Levine and Michael Kimmel in Gay Macho: The Life and Death of the Homosexual Clone:

Extravagant language is common. Such expressions as "Oh my word!" "Good heavens!" and "Oh, my dear!" are readily associated with other aspects of a feminine man. In describing ordinary experiences the male variant is likely to use words as "terrific," "amazing," "completely devoted," "horrible," "tremendous," "sublimely," "charming," "appalling," "vicious," "loathed," and "madly." Exaggerations are made more conspicuous by placing undue or erroneous emphasis on certain syllables and intonations which leave little doubt of the effeminacy of the speaker.

== Status after the Stonewall riots ==
Although being butch was viewed as deviant and socially unacceptable by gay male society, being swish has since lost its mainstream gay status post-Stonewall, and in addition to being used occasionally by mainstream culture is now most often derogatory even when used by gay men. Though it may be assumed that most post-Stonewall gay men view acting swish as internalized homophobia, a concession to stereotypes of gay men as less than manly. However, the Castro clone, a hyper-masculine, macho standard and ideal behaviour that replaced swish, adapted many camp elements such as dishing (gossip).

Thus while clones could view swish as embodying anti-gay stereotypes, being swish was a way of indicating and performing one's identity, indicating that anti-gay stereotypes could be derived from gay identities. Further, one could turn swish on or off, as described in Gay Macho: The Life and Death of the Homosexual Clone:

Just look at all these clones dear. With their pumped up bodies and thick moustaches, they all look so 'butch.' But I remember when everyone was 'nelly'. What a joke! [...] Over the last few years I have watched many of these girls change as the times changed. A couple of years ago, they had puny bodies, lisping voices, and elegant clothes. At parties or Tea Dances, they came in dresses, swooning over [Greta] Garbo and [Bette] Davis. Now, they've 'butched up,' giving up limp wrists and mincing gaits for bulging muscles and manly handshakes, giving up fancy clothes and posh pubs for faded jeans and raunchy discos.

=== Modern LGBT rights movement ===
Most recently, Swish has taken on an empowering and action-oriented meaning within the LGBT rights movement, in part thanks to an organization by the same name. From this point of view, to swish indicates a form of activism that is uplifting, rewarding and fun, and creates opportunities for straight allies to become active in the LGBT civil rights movement.

== See also ==
- Polari
