= Damski =

Damski is a surname. Notable people with the surname include:

- Mel Damski (born 1946), American film and television producer
- Jon-Henri Damski (1937–1997), American essayist, weekly columnist, poet, and community activist
