= Bear Magazine =

Magazine geared toward gay and bisexual men

BEAR Magazine
- Jack Radcliffe on the cover of Bear Magazine (Issue No. 65, September 2008.)
- Editor-in-chief: Richard Jones
- Categories: Men's magazines
- Frequency: Quarterly
- Circulation: 30,000 (2010)
- Publisher: Beard & Bear LLC
- Founded: 1987
- Country: United States
- Based in: New York City, United States
- Language: English
- ISSN: 1049-6521

BEAR Magazine is a periodical geared toward gay and bisexual men who are or admire "bears", stocky or heavyset men with facial and/or body hair. It was initially published in San Francisco, California, in 1987 by Richard Bulger and his partner Chris Nelson and marketed to the bear community within the larger LGBT community.

== History ==
In San Francisco, in 1987, Richard Bulger began a self-copied magazine called BEAR, dedicated to the appreciation of bears. Bulger had been running a modeling agency called Creative Options Associates (COA) with his photographer partner Chris Nelson. With his connection to gay biker culture and proximity to the Lone Star Saloon (a gay bar credited with the inception of the San Francisco Bear Community), Bulger sought to partake in the growing success of zine desktop underground publication taking hold in San Francisco. It's often thought that BEAR Magazine was begun by a man named Bart Thomas, who died of AIDS before the magazine's first publication. However, "Bart Thomas" was a pseudonym Bulger chose for himself ("bart" being the German word for "beard") in the earliest days of the project. A friend of Bulger named David Grant was reported to have suggested the name "Daddy Bear" for this new magazine just before his death from complications from AIDS.

The first copy of BEAR Magazine consisted of 45 xeroxed copies, promoted in The Big Ad and Handjob Quarterly (two established, popular zines at the time).

Originally created as an alternative to the abundance of shaven men represented in gay mainstream media, BEAR gradually expanded to become an internationally distributed glossy magazine, which featured erotic photographs of bears and erotic stories. There was also a classified personals section which, before the emergence of the internet, was one of the few ways for men to find compatible romantic and sexual partners, and to network with men with common interests.

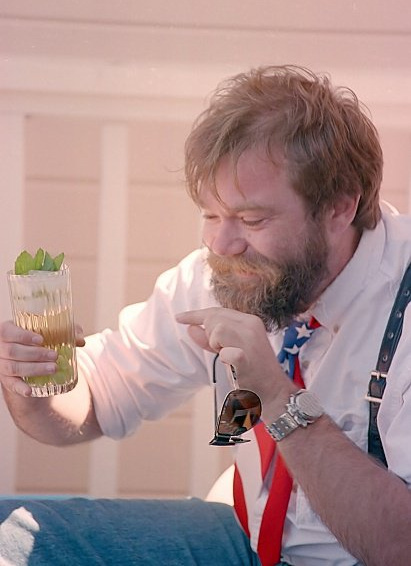
Richard Bulger in 1990.

The first formal company office was in an iconic converted SFFD firehouse at the corner of 16th and Albion Streets in San Francisco, where the gang showers, commercial kitchen, hose tower, and rooftop were often used in photo shoots. Bulger maintained his bedroom in a landing inside the 4-story hose tower. A retail shop distributed their various publications, videos, clothing and lifestyle products to walk-in visitors. In 1991, Brush Creek Media (Bulger's company, named for the town of Brush Creek in Butte County, California where he maintained a summer cabin) moved its office and Bear Store to 367 9th Street in the South of Market district, which is the center of San Francisco's gay leather district and around the corner from Rick Redewill's Lone Star Saloon.

The close proximity of Brush Creek Media to the Lone Star Saloon resulted in a synergistic relationship. With the Bear Store and nearby bars, shops and hotels catering to those who identified as bears, the Lone Star Saloon eventually became considered the quintessential bear bar, further fueling the bear movement. This formed a circuit for locals, tourists and visitors to events such as the International Bear Rendezvous and Folsom Street Fair. In 1994, Beardog Hoffman purchased Brush Creek Media Inc. and began expanding the company into several special-interest gay magazines and video series.

In 2002, Brush Creek Media closed its doors when the IRS seized its inventory. BEAR Magazine publication ceased after issue #64.

In 2006, the BEAR trademark was judicially assigned and registered to Butch Media Ltd of Las Vegas, Nevada, a creditor of Brush Creek Media. In 2007, the court assigned BEAR Magazine and all the Brush Creek Media copyrights to Butch Media Ltd. Bear Omnimedia LLC, the parent company of Butch Media Ltd, continued BEAR Magazine in 2008, starting with issue #65. Under the new direction of publisher and editor-in-chief Steven Wolfe and photographer Teddy Mark, the format was updated in 2010 to better reflect bear movement and LGBT community, covering broader aspects of masculinity. Following a buy-out of Bear Omnimedia LLC the magazine ceased production once again.

Following a long period of time away, the Bear brand has now passed on to Beard & Bear LLC and it has been revealed that a new version of the magazine, titled BEAR, will be returning as a quarterly publication in 2026. The new owners have pledged a refreshed look that honors the history of the brand while being forward looking for a new age.
