= Apricot (color) =

Light yellowish-orangish color

Color coordinates
- Hex triplet: #FBCEB1
- sRGB^{B} (r, g, b): (251, 206, 177)
- HSV (h, s, v): (24°, 29%, 98%)
- CIELCh_{uv} (L, C, h): (86, 40, 41°)
- Source: Maerz and Paul
- ISCC–NBS descriptor: Pale orange yellow
- B: Normalized to [0–255] (byte)

Apricot is a light yellowish-orangish color that is similar to the color of apricots. However, it is paler than actual apricots.

== Etymology ==
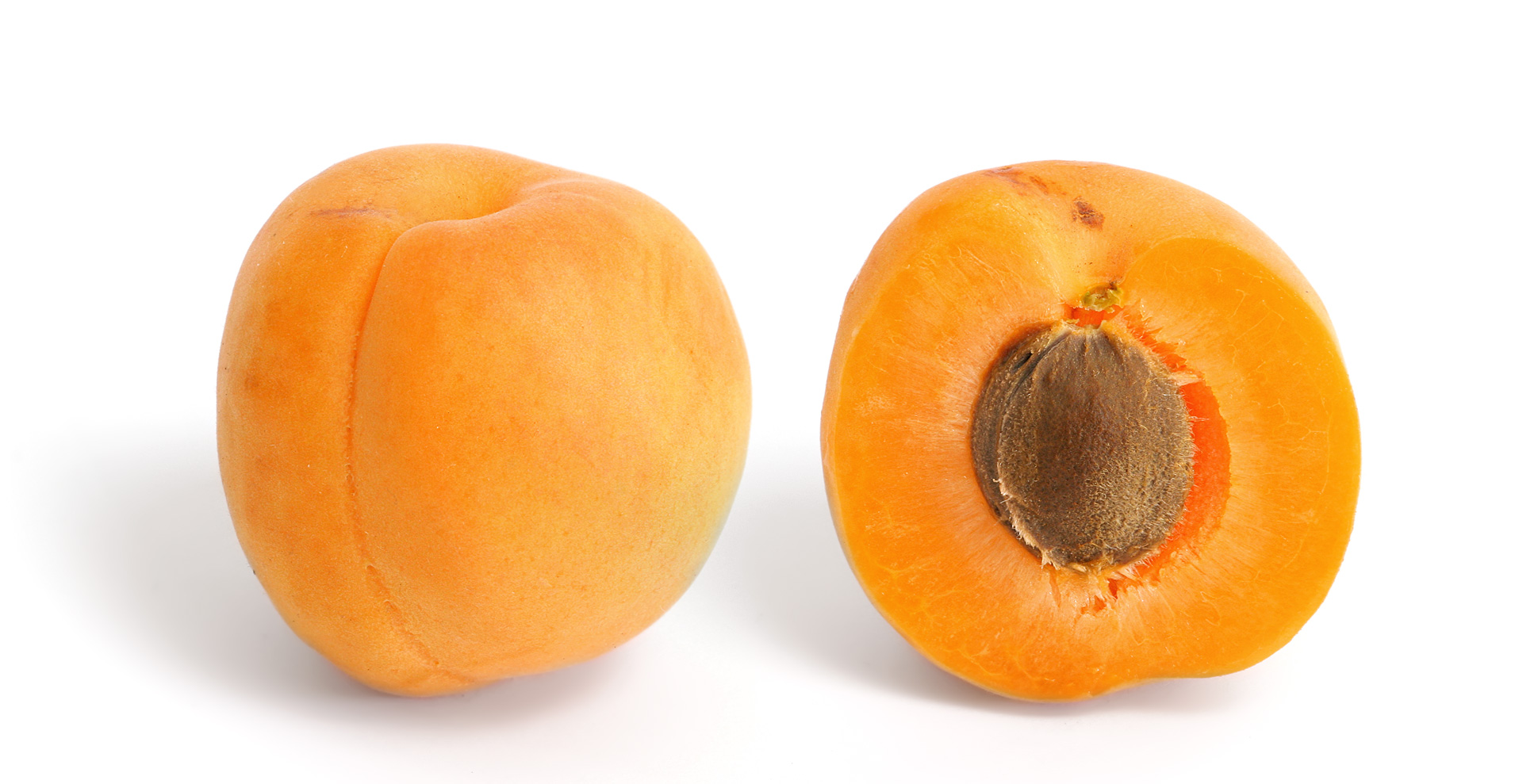
An apricot and its cross section

The etymology of the color apricot (and the fruit): the word comes from the Arabic Al-birquq (itself from Greek berikokon, ultimately from Latin praecoquum). Apricot has been in use as a color name since 1851.

== Variations of apricot ==
=== Light apricot ===
Apricot (Crayola)

Color coordinates
- Hex triplet: #FDD5B1
- sRGB^{B} (r, g, b): (253, 213, 177)
- HSV (h, s, v): (28°, 30%, 99%)
- CIELCh_{uv} (L, C, h): (88, 41, 48°)
- Source: Crayola
- ISCC–NBS descriptor: Pale orange yellow
- B: Normalized to [0–255] (byte)

Displayed at right is the light tone of apricot called apricot since 1958 in Crayola crayons.

=== Mellow apricot ===
Mellow apricot

Color coordinates
- Hex triplet: #F8B878
- sRGB^{B} (r, g, b): (248, 184, 120)
- HSV (h, s, v): (30°, 52%, 97%)
- CIELCh_{uv} (L, C, h): (79, 69, 46°)
- Source: BS 5252
- ISCC–NBS descriptor: Moderate orange yellow
- B: Normalized to [0–255] (byte)

Displayed at right is the color mellow apricot.

This is one of the colors on the British Standards 5252 color list. This color is #06E50 on the 5252 color list. The 5252 color list is for colors used in color coordination and in building construction. The British Standard color lists were first formulated in 1930 and reached their present form in 1955.

== Apricot in human culture ==
Sexuality

- In the bandana code of the gay leather subculture, wearing an apricot bandana means that one is a chubby chaser if worn on the right, and a chub if worn on the left.

== See also ==
- List of colors
