= Convergence (ABC convention) =

- Status: Active
- Genre: Chub (gay culture)
- Location: North America
- Inaugurated: 1986
- Most recent: 2016
- Organizer: Big Gay Mens Organization (BGMO)
- Website: http://biggaymen.org

Convergence is an annual North American social gathering of gay men of size (chubs) and their admirers (chasers). The event is considered the longest running social gathering of its kind in North America and serves a particular community, also known as the Chubs and Chasers community; a vibrant sub-culture of the gay community at large. Convergence is held during the US Labor Day holiday weekend. The event has a history that goes back to 1986, when the first Convergence was held in Seattle, Washington. Since then, the event has been hosted annually in different cities across North America.

== Location ==
Convergence is a "floating" event; the location for each year is determined by the Big Gay Mens Organization (BGMO), formerly known as Affiliated Bigmen's Clubs (ABC), and originally associated with local Girth & Mirth chapters.

Past Convergences have been held in:

- 1986 Seattle Mayflower Park Hotel August 28 – September 1, 1986
- 1987 Washington, D.C., at the Vista September 3–7, 1987
- 1988 New York City at the Mackelow September 1–5, 1988
- 1989 Los Angeles Hollywood Roosevelt Hotel August 31 - September 4, 1989
- 1990 Chicago at the Holiday Inn August 30 – September 3, 1990
- 1991 Boston at the Swissotel August 29 – September 2, 1991
- 1992 San Francisco Cathedral Hill Hotel September 3–7, 1992
- 1993 Washington, D.C., Embassy Suites September 2–6, 1993
- 1994 New York City at the Millennium September 1–5, 1994
- 1995 Seattle at the Westin August 31 – September 4, 1995
- 1996 San Diego Radisson Hotel Circle
- 1997 Philadelphia at the Holiday Inn
- 1998 Reno at the Sands
- 1999 Denver at the Adam’s Mark Hotel
- 2000 Montreal at the Holiday Inn
- 2001 Dallas at the Sheraton
- 2002 Minneapolis at the Millennium
- 2003 Washington, D.C., at the Grand Hyatt August 28 – September 1, 2003
- 2004 White Plains at the Crown Plaza
- 2005 New Orleans - Cancelled due to Hurricane Katrina
- 2006 Houston at the Marriott Medical Center
- 2007 Minneapolis at the Hyatt Nicollet Mall
- 2008 Washington, D.C., at the Marriott Gateway August 28 – September 1, 2008
- 2009 Las Vegas a.k.a. "BiggerVegas" at the Tuscany Suites and Casino
- 2010 Orlando at the Doubletree (formerly International Plaza)
- 2011 Boston at the CoCo Key Resort and Waterpark (North shore)
- 2012 Chicago at the Renaissance Chicago, Northbrook
- 2013 New Orleans at the InterContential
- 2014 Scottsdale at the DoubleTree Resort by Hilton Paradise Valley-Scottsdale
- 2015 Seattle at the DoubleTree Hilton Sea-Tac September 2–7, 2015 http://emeraldcityconvergence.com/#!/?page_id=13
- 2016 Orlando at the Wyndham Orlando Resort International Drive August 30 – September 5, 2016 http://www.orlandoconvergence.com/
- 2017 Las Vegas at the Luxor Hotel & Casino
- 2018 New York City at the Pennsylvania Hotel
- 2019 San Diego at the Marriott Mission Valley
- 2020 St. Louis at the Renaissance St. Louis Airport Hotel

== See also ==
- Chub (gay slang)
