= Jon-Henri Damski =

American writer

- Born: March 31, 1937; Seattle, Washington
- Died: November 1, 1997 (aged 60); Chicago, Illinois
- Occupations: essayist; poet; columnist
- Known for: weekly columns in LGBTQ press (Chicago); co-founder, Illinois Federation for Human Rights

Jon-Henri Damski (March 31, 1937 – November 1, 1997) was an American essayist, weekly columnist, poet and community activist in Chicago's gay, lesbian, bisexual and transgender communities from the mid to late 1970s until the late 1990s. At the time of his death, Damski was the longest-running columnist published in the American gay and lesbian press, having written for publication every week from November 8, 1977, until November 12, 1997.

Damski is also considered the first gay columnist in the American Midwest to publish under his real name and photo, starting in January, 1979, when no legal protections existed in the city of Chicago to give one recourse if fired from a job, or forced from housing, due to sexual orientation. Damski's epigrams, columns and poetry have been gathered in several collections and anthologies (see "Damski and Firetrap" section, below).

Damski was considered one of the people most instrumental in helping to pass Chicago's Human Rights Ordinance in 1988, which granted protections in jobs and housing to members of the gay and lesbian communities within the city. In this campaign, Damski worked closely with activists Arthur Johnston (Damski's close friend and benefactor), Rick Garcia, and Laurie Dittman; working under the auspices of the organization Gay and Lesbian Town Meeting, the quartet became widely known as the "Gang of Four." Damski was considered especially influential in securing support for the Human Rights Ordinance from conservative aldermen who had in the past opposed the bill. In 1990, Damski worked to pass Chicago's hate crimes ordinance. In 1991, Damski was inducted into the Chicago Gay and Lesbian Hall of Fame for his years of writing and his activism. In 1997, Mayor Richard M. Daley and the City Council presented Damski with a Proclamation for his two decades of service to the city of Chicago and its gay, lesbian and transgender communities.

Damski had been diagnosed with melanoma in 1993. After 7 surgeries, in mid–1997 the melanoma had metastasized to his lungs and liver. Damski refused an experimental treatment, telling friends and readers he wanted to maintain his quality of life, a clear-head and the ability to write during the last months of his life. He wrote weekly until he collapsed in late October, 1997—having unknowingly written his 20th anniversary column and one more for the road, both of which were published posthumously.

== Childhood ==
Damski was known for his double-thick lenses, Cubs baseball cap and T-shirt & tie combinations as he walked the neighborhoods in Chicago, gathering news for his columns. His vision had been marred from the start of his life—as a premature birth in 1930s Seattle, he was also not even expected to live; yet Damski wrote about this in later years as a positive thing: it freed him up from all the pressures put on his older brother by his parents.

Damski's father, Henry Damski, had spent time in an orphanage in Birmingham, Alabama, before later attending the New England Conservatory of Music. In Seattle, he would become the conductor of the city's Symphony Orchestra; under a stage name, he also led jazz dance bands and hosted his own radio show. Henry Damski died at age 59 of a massive heart attack. Ruth, Damski's mother, hailed from Rockford, Illinois. She was known as Ruthie. Her father moved the family of nine brother to the Washington State, where they were raised in the Northwest. The move would later be followed by a divorce, yet everyone stayed close in bringing up the large family, now extended, so that exes continued to participate even with their new spouses. Damski's mother's side of the family included tavern owners, brothers who worked in the lumber mills, and brothers who enlisted in the armed services.

Damski wrote often about having a dyslexia so serious that reading books was often next to impossible: his father read aloud to him all of his schoolwork until he was 9. Despite problems with his eyesight, he nevertheless had been given regular piano lessons and had some promise, though he suddenly gave it all up when he realized he wanted to be a baseball pitcher—his number one dream from 9 until 17.

Damski attended Lakeside Academy for Boys in Seattle—later simply Lakewood Academy—where he was first tutored in the Classics—the Greek and Latin languages and history. Damski's parents would split-up in the 1940s, with his mother moving to Palm Springs, California (the home of a new lover) and his father remaining in Seattle. His parents would date others and get married; Damski later wrote that he had learned from his maternal grandmother that step-families taught one how to let go of the past and how to get along with additions to the family.

The divorce between Henry and Ruthie was prolonged and public—lasting four years—partly because divorce was still uncommon in the 1940s, and partly because Damski's mother had been a minor actress and his father was a public figure in the jazz and classical music scene. Along with continual press coverage: "There were preliminary divorce proceedings and hearings; private detectives and lawyers on each side; detectives from my mother's new love interest hovering over them from his own messy divorce...a separate custody battle and trial over me, and where I was to go."

The divorce drama was broken up by visits to a farm in Cathcart, Washington, where Damski's grandfather had a cabin. Knowing he had a wild streak, Damski's uncle George had provided a place for his grandfather Bill (Ruthie's father) to relax and live out his life. Jon-Henri and his older brother, Joe, visited him. "He taught us how to trail, fish, walk in the woods and generally enjoy communing with nature ... Woodburning ash from the stove permeated grandpa's clothes. One whiff of that smell today, and I still think of his stove and how we used to heat water on it for our bath."

At eight years old, Damski was given a choice of which parent to live with, and chose to live with his father. He later recalled the painful letter he had to submit to the court (and which reporters would write about). His father's lawyers had coached him on what to write and later say in court apparently without success. The result was an odd joint custody, with the young Damski "bounced on my own every six months from Seattle to California and back." While in California, Damski spent two Summers in the Desert Inn, and others in San Francisco. His parents would eventually reconcile and become lovers, again—but not marry again; for Ruthie was off to an engagement in Japan for 2 years. While gone, Damski's father died, and when she eventually returned, it was with sole custody.

Damski later summed it up thusly: he was mostly together with his mother for the early years of his life and apart from her for most of the next ten, as he travelled the circuit from her and a stepfather, to his father and a stepmother, and back. He then lived with her and took care of her during the last years of her life, when, he writes, they "became quite close friends."

== Education and early work ==
Damski attended Whitman College in Walla Walla, Washington from 1955 to 1959, and he was awarded a Woodrow Wilson Fellowship in 1959. He chose Brandeis University because of Herbert Marcuse and its History of Ideas Program. Damski's masters thesis was a collection of 10,000 epigrams. "Marcuse warned me that writing epigrams was dangerous to my thought and health," wrote Damski in the late 1980s; Damski would continue to write them until his 1997 death. (No final tally has yet been ascertained.)

Damski writes, though, that he left Brandeis with a "broken wing." Elsewhere, he comments: "When I was 23, I had this wild idea that I could 'straighten' out, or up, or something. I went with [Whitman College friend] George [Pettibone] in his car as he drove back to law school at the University of Michigan." Damski spent ten days living the life of a law student with George and his friends. "I thought if I could enter law school, and take up a legitimate craft, people would not think I was so odd and queer. Momentarily I was the philosopher who was trying to come in from the cold. It's fun to get stoned; but it's not fun to get stoned by your fellow creatures when you don't think like they think." Damski credits Pettibone with getting him back on his own journey: "No other guy in our class could be me," Pettibone told him. Some called him "Socrates" in college, Damski writes. Others labeled him "the great pretender."

"George sent me back on my erratic, wandering path," Damski wrote in 1993.

That path, then, returned him to Seattle in 1962, where he became an account executive with KING-FM. He would soon begin writing documentary scripts for the KING-TV NBC affiliate's King Screen Productions. While doing research on Seattle street kids, Damski first heard rock and roll from the Beatles, Janis Joplin and "my neighbor, Jimi Hendrix." Damski became swept up in the new music: he used his TV money from documentary writing to travel up and down the West Coast following other rockers: The Rolling Stones, The Doors and Jimi Hendrix; he saw "the Stones more than 15 times in 10 different cities."

The documentary work also provided some crucial lessons on understanding and writing about others' lives. In a 1981 interview with Albert Williams for Chicago's GayLife newspaper, Damski says: "When I started interviewing people, I wrote about a 19-year-old boy who was beaten up. I realized as I phrased it accurately as I knew it, that he had been forced out of home by his father, and that was why he was living with other people at 19. Of course, his father insisted, 'I never forced my son out.'"' And Williams follows-up: "This gave Damski a greater awareness of the subjective nature of truth, which has a lot to do with his writing. He deals with 'fictional facts'—the dreams and illusions we all live with."

In 1967, Damski began attending the University of Washington for graduate work in the Classics, where he worked on a Ph.D. from 1967 to 1974. While some sources show Damski completing the Ph.D.—even he writes that he had problems getting to the finish, with, again, no sources available which definitively say why. We do know from University of Washington records that Damski earned the Masters of Arts, and completed the coursework necessary to become a Ph.C. (Ph.D. candidate).

From 1970 to 1973, Damski lectured at Bryn Mawr College in the Classics department. Damski also led a seminar at the Aspen Summer Institute on Socrates. He returned to Seattle in 1974, where work continued towards his Ph.D. and he lectured at Whitman College.

== Life in Chicago ==
In 1974, Damski traveled to Chicago for the annual American Philological Society convention, scheduled for that December. He had hoped to continue lecturing in the Classics and finish his Ph.D., but was unable to find work in the small, crowded Classics field. This would make finishing the Ph.D. thesis difficult, though notes show him working on it through 1975.

In Chicago, then, Damski wrote daily in his typed journals, using a portable typewriter and the Newberry Library as his base. He started with impressions of Chicago and continued with epigrams and then poems. The output of poems between 1976 and 1978 and the discovery of two complete, yet unpublished manuscripts—along with a fistful of rejection letters—suggest Damski had begun to put the Ph.D. behind him and began to focus on becoming a published poet.

During these first Chicago years, Damski lived at 917 Cuyler Avenue in Chicago, not far from Irving Park Road and Broadway. In a letter from December, 1974, he describes it this way: "I live in a first class Spanish-speaking area not far from Wrigley Field, which is also located a few blocks from the water and French markets. I live in the upper, but not necessarily better half, of an old mansion: very warm and comfortable, nine rooms, frescoes on the walls (not the ice box), and one grand piano, but of course: no television. In the old days, judges and sea captains occupied it...and a cave canem protects the remaining ground which looks out over a new McDonald's golden arch parking lot. Thus I have the best of two worlds: 19th and 20th century..."

Damski soul searched as he made it through a few temporary jobs from 1975 to 1977, even as he knocked out several hundred poems and (at quick glance) a few thousand more epigrams. During the day, he also worked for a translation service and held a stint as a Republican poll watcher; he also considered a position at Encyclopædia Britannica. A draft letter shows it to be the second of three options, in October 1977: "quit", "take the job at Britannica" or "continue to live dangerously"; he would choose danger and begin writing for the gay press.

The decision was not easy; his "quit" option was about quitting something he equated with life itself. Given the references in this letter to many facts and features of Greek history, Damski could be dramatically contextualizing his own life, or have reached the end of a 10-year deadline on Ph.D. thesis submission: "But my ghost will not let me give up," he wrote. An epigram a week later continues this line of thought: "Death is the answer to my only prayer," and "You get to heaven by being wiped out."

Damski did not wallow—in the next line he writes: "Great Expectations: If I count on my finger, they cut off my hands." He begins to turn the corner from darkness, to black humor, and ends up with blue humor: "Good gays turn both cheeks." And the day after his "options" letter was written, he observed: "I don't worship mediocrity, I live it to the hilt." About job possibilities: "The trouble with working for others is others."

Damski kept his humor intact by taking his life, daily, to the written page.

Damski soon found employment with Truman College, one of Chicago's city colleges, where he taught in its Senior Living program. Damski would teach his seniors in nursing homes for the next fifteen years—providing him with a modest, yet steady income, while he began to devote his literary output to the gay press, working for $10 a pop until the end of the 70s.

In August 1977, Damski moved into the multi-story Belair Hotel on Diversey Parkway. He maintained his residence in the SRO (single room occupancy) mid-rise until his death. The Belair became a subject of his column in 1993, after a fire in another SRO; he described the Belair's safety, and also wrote: "... [I] have stayed here because it is where I want to live and work. Any time I've lived on my own, I have lived in a hotel. I like hotel living. To me, a hotel room makes a perfect office for a writer ... The attitude of the place is welcome and friendly. Gays and lesbians have lived here since the building was built over 70-plus years ago. The motto of the hotel is 'Permanent Guests Invited, Transients Welcome.' Some guests stay for a night, others for their whole life. Several of my senior neighbors have been here since World War II, when the monthly rent was a dollar a day. Now it is a hundred-plus dollars a week."

Damski's Chicago debut in print came on February 17, 1975, with a letter to the Chicago Daily News about the "Daley machine," shorthand for the political connections of Mayor Richard J. Daley. Damski also was getting published in the Sun-Times' Line o' type column, which accepted reader submissions, usually epigram-length, humorous musings. His letters and epigrams continued to get published late into the Fall of 1977.

Damski's first "Bits & Pieces" written with Gay Chicago News in mind were penned November 8, 1977: "As a gay Karl Marx would say: Sex according to your ability to sex; and pay according to your ability to pay." And on December 2, 1977, with a defense of queens, Damski began the weekly columns which would continue until October 29, 1997. Damski would write regularly for Gay Chicago Magazine, Gay Milwaukee, Midwest Times, GayLife, Windy City Times, Outlines and Nightlines, as well as for humor magazines "under presumed names," as he puts it on an early resume.

== Gay Chicago (1977–1982) ==
Damski worked with Ralph Paul Gernhardt and Dan DiLeo on Gay Chicago. Gernhardt had been on the original staff of GayLife newspaper. DiLeo had worked as a typesetter for the Sun-Times. Gay Chicago began as Gay Chicago News in 1977, modeled after Gay Community News weekly out of Boston. In April 1978, Gay Chicago News became Gay Chicago Magazine.

Damski wrote for Gay Chicago News starting in December, 1977 and continued with Gay Chicago Magazine until 1982. He also participated in its sister publications: Milwaukee Calendar, which became Gay Milwaukee, which became Escape, and then a short-lived monthly, Midwest Times. Along with Gay Detroit and Gay Ohio, Damski's columns became widely distributed in the American Midwest, to towns in Wisconsin, Illinois, Indiana, Michigan and Ohio.

Damski's "Nothing Personal" columns were known for their forthright observations of the Chicago lives who had begun to come together in the 1970s and recognize in themselves a nascent community. In mirroring what he saw, Damski regularly used "street language," (to the dismay of some readers) and wrote with a mix of styles reminiscent of New Journalism combined with a dose of Boyd McDonald, the chronicler of same-sex encounters whose columns in the Boston press had been influential on Damski and early Chicago publishers Damski worked with.

Besides reproducing the play-by-play debates among gay men about what to call themselves, and where and how they met in backrooms, bath houses, bars, and park bushes, as well giving voice to the fears of thrills of living in a violence-prone neighborhood, Damski wrote about how the mainstream press covered gay and lesbian issues, taking to task the Sun-Times, and Time magazine for their reporting. Damski also wrote back and forth in running battles with nationally syndicated columnists Mike Royko and Bob Greene. And he wrote about the arrest and conviction of John Wayne Gacy, the first of several serial killers who would prey on the Chicago's gay community.

== GayLife (1982–1985) ==
In 1982, Damski moved his column to GayLife, where it appeared on the front page and he got a "substantial pay raise." But best of all, he would later write, he began to work under the editorship of Albert Williams. Williams encouraged Damski to expand his columns to cover more about Chicago politics, including the divisions within the gay community between supporters of Mayor Harold Washington and former Mayor Jane Byrne, as well as the efforts by members of the gay community to win support from the politically divided Chicago City Council for passage of a long-pending gay rights bill.

Damski's growing familiarity with ward politics in Chicago would later make him an indispensable asset in passing the Human Rights Ordinance, in 1988.

Damski's writing and the reporting at GayLife were marked by their coverage of the murder of a street hustler named Danny Bridges in August, 1984. Damski would, in 1986, cover the trials of Larry Eyler, the man arrested and tried for the horrific dismemberment of Bridges; and Damski would write, again, in 1992 about an attempt to retry Eyler (see Windy City Times section, below).

Gay related immune deficiency (GRID) - what was later to be renamed AIDS - was first written about by Damski while at GayLife. He also continued his unsparing critique of Chicago's mainstream press accounts of any and all things gay and lesbian. And he continued to write with humor, insight plus a little Classics scholarship thrown in; two excerpts from 1983's "Why Men Go to Gay Bars" provide a sample. First, he sets up the situation: "You cannot, however, reduce the sociology of gay bars to a single sex score. The most painful life experience for most gay men occurs right before 'coming out' when you think you are the only gay person in the world. You feel dismembered and cut off from everyone. You feel so alone and isolated in your narcissistic nightmare that at times you feel like you are trapped in a suicidal black hole facing psychic death."

Then he says what it's really like in a gay bar: "Outsiders have an image that gay bars and 'haunts' are filled with anonymous strangers, replicant clones eager to plug into each other and then split. Not so. Gay people are not anonymous but protononymous: We know each other by our first names and are eager and quick to learn them. In the military you can be known forever by your last name, but in the gay world your first name is your magic name. The network of first-name friendships extends everywhere: I know Michaels all over the world, from Alpha Michael to Omega Michael. Can we talk? The main reason guys go to gay bars is to talk and have a social experience."

While at GayLife, Damski became a close friend of the paper's sales manager, Bob Bearden. During 1985, financial resources at GayLife became increasingly tight. Damski was dropped by the paper in March, and his editor Albert Williams left in May. A few months later, Bearden and his lover, GayLife entertainment editor Jeff McCourt, left GayLife to launch the rival Windy City Times. McCourt and Bearden were joined by most of GayLife's staff and contributors, including Damski and Williams. GayLife folded not long after.

== Windy City Times (1985–1995) ==
Damski began writing for Windy City Times in its first issue, October 3, 1985 under the heading JHD. He remained with the paper after the 1987 death, from AIDS, of his friend Bob Bearden. He stayed with the publication almost ten years, until being fired abruptly late in May, 1995, by publisher Jeff McCourt.

McCourt blamed Damski for a personal rumor about McCourt which had appeared in a new weekly in the LGBTQ Chicago press, called Babble. Richard Cooke's "10,000 BTUs" included a few lines in a page of gossip; Cooke was an old friend of Damski's from the Gay Chicago days. The debacle became a rancor-filled airing of dirty laundry by Damki's and McCourt's supporters in both the Chicago Reader's "Hot Type" media column and Babble.

During the nearly ten years Damski wrote for Windy City Times, he covered the exponential toll of AIDS on the community; the battle for the Human Rights Ordinance, and its 1988 passage; the battle over funding for AIDS in the city of Chicago; the trials of Larry Eyler for the murder and dismemberment of Danny Bridges; the lives and deaths of colleagues and close friends—and ultimately, the cancer diagnosis he received in October, 1993. Michael Miner, author of the Chicago Reader's "Hot Type," notes Damski had been fired even as he was facing surgeries for melanoma.

Even a partial list of close friends and colleagues for whom Damski wrote obit columns from 1986 to 1992, alone, sounds like the toll of war: community organizer and Girth & Mirth founder Ira Jones; Windy City Times co-founder Bob Bearden; Outsider artist/DJ and Damski muse Omega Michael Orsetti; political cartoonist, AIDS activist, and ACT-UP co-founder Danny Sotomayor, and Chicago Alderman Kathy Osterman.

They did not all die of AIDS, but many of Damski's friends and companions did. He recalls those lost to AIDS in 1991, when, writing about relationships, he remembers that his mother had "told me to date many and younger." He lists "Joe, David, Dan, Bob, Bryan and my long-time companion, Omega [Michael Orsetti]."

"I am not bitter, just in shock. I feel like I have been hit by God's own Stun Gun."

After Damski's diagnosis of melanoma two years later, an uncommon theme began to show up more often in his weekly writings: he began to speak more about his own life both before and during what would be his 23 years in Chicago.

In the pages of Windy City Times, Damski dissected the trials of the man arrested for the horrific dismemberment of Danny Bridges. He wrote a multi-part series on the trials of Larry Eyler in 1986, and in 1992. Damski would maintain for decades that Eyler had been wrongly convicted in Bridges' death as the sole killer. Damski and others believed an Indiana State University professor, Dr. Robert David Little, had been at least an accomplice—and he would publish multiple columns about the topic over the next ten years, including an interview with a source who went on the record placing Dr. Little "at the scene of the crime" and while under oath, showing scars from when the information sciences professor had cut him during sex. Meanwhile, Dr. Little was tried separately, in Indiana, before the witness Damski interviews had been found; Dr. Little was cleared of any wrongdoing. Kathleen Zellner, Eyler's attorney at the time of his death, continued to maintain in court filings that the sole killer of Danny Bridges was Larry Eyler.

Damski also came out (again) as queer in 1989, not long after the passage of the Human Rights Ordinance. In so doing, he was returning to a non-label label he had tried on along with others in his earliest columns when he explored the dynamics of being called "faggot," "queer," "gay" and "homosexual". Damski is arguably the first queer columnist in America. Damski's writing seemed to take wing, in some ways, at this point, as the weight of political activities with the fabled "Gang of Four" could give way to the funny and insightful, classically trained mind which had kept its eye so intently on the civil rights ball for fifteen years. This work and his queer perspective on life have been collected in the anthology, dead/queer/proud (Firetrap Press, 2002); with his Classics training, Damski wasn't about to end up just your average Dead White Male, although d/q/p does qualify as a "great book."

Damski's last column for Windy City Times was published May 18, 1995.

== Outlines and Nightlines (1995–1997) ==
Damski announced his column's re-emergence in Nightlines on June 21, 1995. A new weekly column, "Queer Thoughts and Mini-Essays," began on July 5, 1995, in Nightlines, and JHD continued on a monthly basis in Outlines, its sister-publication with the July, 1995 issue. Nightlines and Outlines were edited and published by Tracy Baim, an alumnus of GayLife and Windy City Times (which she would eventually purchase and publish, as well).

It was during this last period of Damski's weekly career that he announced the formation of a publishing cooperative with John Michael Vore and friends, called Firetrap Press. This would be the third time in ten years that Damski announced he would be publishing his long-planned books. This time, it seemed to work.

His first reading was from his collection of poems about living with cancer, in November, 1996. Thus, in his last phase of this life, Damski added yet another sense of identity to the list he had been writing about for 20 years: cancer survivor.

Damski's final column for Nightlines was published October 29, 1997. He wrote about the "denial of the body", complaining that as gays and lesbians achieved success on the national stage in America, they were de-gaying themselves, and turning into eunuchs.

== Chicago Exit: Firetrap Press (1996-2002) ==
In 1996, Damski teamed up with John Michael Vore, then a Chicago-based writer, to begin Firetrap Press. This collective of writers and artists would grow to include the work of over two dozen writers, artists and their friends.

Before Damski's death, three collections of his works were published by Firetrap. These were considered "keep-sake" editions—limited-run, hand-made non-books, put together by friends of Damski's, including Lori Cannon, James Tennant and Vore. Each collection sold out:

Poems for the Fo(u)rth Quarter: Virtually Incurable But Not Yet Terminal: poems begun in 1996 and reflecting his take on a "medical diagnosis"; the poems were collected in an actual medical file with the ominous words X-RAY REPORTS on the cover. The more than hundred poems were illustrated with work by Omega Michael Orsetti, Damski's muse.

Damski-to-Go: a "deck" of 48 humorous Damski one-liners, or epigrams, illustrated by Vore and collected in a cubicle, take-out food container. Some of these dated to Damski's original work in the History of Ideas in the late 1950s and early 1960s.

Angels Into Dust: The New Town Anthology, Volume 1: a collection of columns spanning Damski's Chicago career and covering the life and birth of New Town, Damski's name for the g/l/b/t/q communities. This edition was the most "book like," using, as it did, the prototypes for what would soon become Print On-Demand technologies.

Firetrap publisher/editor Vore updated the books and created three new "facsimile" digital editions in 2002, making the limited-run works available as Portable Document Format books on-line.

Also in 2002, a fourth anthology of columns came out under the title: dead/queer/proud.

dead/queer/proud: explores the trajectory of Damski's writing which made him a "queer thinker"; it advances a number of philosophical critiques of Western life found in Damski's weekly columns, with grounding in the works of French authors Gilles Deleuze and Félix Guattari.

== Since 2009 ==
Four new works by Damski were published by Firetrap Press in its last incarnation as a volunteer cooperative of writers, artists—and friends of Damski—in 2009:

Nothing Personal: Chronicles of Chicago's LGBTQ Community, 1977-1997 edited by John Michael Vore, Albert Williams and Owen Keehnen: captures the history of the LGBTQ community in Chicago as it defines itself. A landmark portrait of the LGBTQ community, drawn from Damski's first Gay Chicago "Nothing Personal" columns and continuing to his final "Nightlines" contributions.

Fresh Frozen: First Chicago Poems edited by John Michael Vore from a manuscript by Damski from 1977, includes poems and epigrams from 1975 to 1976. In three sections, "Wholes," "Bits & Pieces," and "Throw Aways," Damski writes free form, mini-portraits of those he knows, and describes what it's like in his first Chicago Winter as he slips and slides towards his 39th birthday and coming out. This is the first in Damski's "Coming Out Trilogy" about the 1970s Chicago scene.

My Blue Monk: Poems from Blood and Sugar edited by John Michael Vore from poems by Damski during 1977–1978. In the second book in the "Coming Out Trilogy" Damski falls in love with the man who would be his lifelong muse. The poems act as an almost daily diary of the ups and downs of love—and figuring out what two people mean to one another.

Eat My Words: More Chicago Poems from the '70s edited by John Michael Vore from a manuscript by Damski: the closing volume of the "Coming Out Trilogy" by Damski, this large book of poems takes us to the close of the decade. Includes Damski's poem "The Body Politic" written for and performed at Chicago's Body Politic Theatre on the occasion of Jimmy Carter's inauguration in 1977.
