= Rick Redewill =

- Born: August 9, 1952; Columbia, CA, US
- Died: April 14, 1993 (aged 40); San Francisco, CA
- Occupation(s): Founder, Lone Star Saloon

Rick Redewill (Richard Byron Redewill; 9 August 1952, in California – 14 April 1993) was the founder of the Lone Star Saloon, the gay bar which is credited as helping give birth to the Bear Community in San Francisco. He is buried in Georgetown, CA.
