= Bearforce 1 =

Dutch gay dance music band

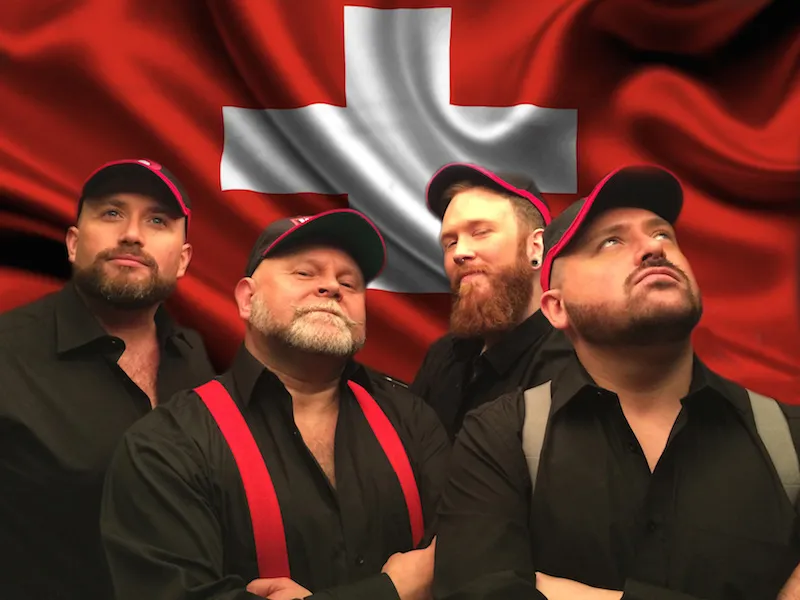
- Bearforce 1 in 2015 during their campaign to represent Switzerland in the Eurovision Song Contest.

Background information
- Origin: Netherlands and Northern Ireland
- Genres: Pop, Dance
- Years active: 2006–Present
- Label: C+R Records
- Members: Robert Brown (2006–present); Paul Bloomer (2014-Present); Brian McBride (2019-present); Ambrose Donnelly (2019-present); Yuri (2006–2009); Ian Turnel (2006–2008); Peter Johansson (2006–2008); Peter Gerrist (2008–2009); Eddi (2007–2008); Ryan Wilkinson (2014–2018); Simon Crawford (2014–2019); Alan Gordon (2019-2022)

Bearforce 1 is a gay dance music band from the Netherlands, known mainly for a YouTube hit video, "Bearforce 1". Founded in 2006 and promoting their image as bears, they released three singles accompanied by YouTube videos, and scored hits in the Netherlands before breaking up in 2009. The band reformed in 2014 with 3 new members, with only the lead singer, Robert Brown returning.

== History ==
Bearforce 1 was founded by three Dutchmen (Ian Turnel, Peter Johansson, and Yuri) and an Irishman (Robert Brown), led by actor and producer Roeland Fernhout. Their eponymous single "Bearforce 1", a medley of popular dance songs including Sabrina Salerno's Boys and Dead or Alive's You Spin Me Round, accompanied by a video clip in which the four bears dance and lip-sync, was a YouTube phenomenon and ended as #20 on LOGO TV's Ultimate Queer Videos Countdown. Praise by Perez Hilton led to a tour in the United States and attention in the US media--The Washington Post wrote of the band, "Finally, there's a boy band for older, hairy gay men."

They released a second single, "Christmas is here," in 2007, also accompanied by a popular YouTube video (shot in the snow in Austria, in which the four men danced in red boxers, tank tops, ski outfits, and Santa Claus suits), The song entered the Single Top 100 at #7. In December 2007 they played a series of concerts in Rotterdam Ahoy with Gerard Joling, and in 2008 they played at the first same-sex marriage ceremony to take place at the Tilburg Pink Monday fair. A third single, "Shake That Thing," was again praised by Perez Hilton.

The same year, Johansson was replaced by Peter Gerrist. On Saturday 3 January 2009, Andrew Lloyd Webber and record company executive Colin Barlow dismissed an attempt by Bearforce 1 to represent the United Kingdom at the Eurovision Song Contest 2009 on BBC1's Eurovision: Your Country Needs You as "hopeless". The band broke up in late 2009. In 2014 Bearforce 1 reformed with three new members, Robert Brown being the only returning member. The band's comeback single 'Action Man' has been entered into the competition to be selected as Switzerland's entry for the Eurovision Song Contest 2015.

In 2020 a new line up of Bearforce1 auditioned for Britain's Got Talent.

== Discography ==
=== Singles ===
- 2007: "Bearforce 1"
- 2007: "Christmas Is Here" (reached #28 in Dutch Singles Chart)
- 2008: "Shake That Thing"
- 2014: "Action Man"
