= Bear flag (gay culture) =

Pride flag used by the bear subculture

- International Bear Brotherhood Flag
- Proportion: 3:5
- Adopted: 1995; 31 years ago
- Design: Field of seven equally sized horizontal stripes: dark brown, orange/rust, golden yellow, tan, white, gray, and black; with a bear paw print in the canton
- Designed by: Craig Byrnes

The International Bear Brotherhood Flag, also known as the bear flag or the bear pride flag, is a pride flag designed to represent the bear subculture within the LGBTQIA+ community. The colors of the flag symbolize species of animal bears throughout the world: dark brown, orange/rust, golden yellow, tan, white, gray, and black. Though not necessarily referring to human skin color or hair color, the flag was designed with inclusion in mind. The bear culture celebrates secondary sex characteristics such as growth of body hair and facial hair, traits associated with bears.

== Background ==
The first recorded flag created to represent the bear community was made in 1992 by Denver's Front Range Bears social club.

Craig Byrnes created the most widely adopted version of the bear flag in Washington, D.C. in 1995. A founding member of the Chesapeake Bay Bears, Byrnes designed the flag as part of a senior project on the bear community for his undergraduate psychology degree at Mary Baldwin College, wanting to include a flag representing the community alongside his research. He produced the original colored design using crayons, then enlisted two other members of the bear community to develop it: Paul Witzkoske helped turn the design into a graphic, and Bob Nicholson sewed the first four templates. The four 3-by-5-foot (0.9 m × 1.5 m) machine-sewn prototype flags were displayed and voted on at the Chesapeake Bay Bears' "Bears of Summer" event in July 1995.

The winning design (developed with Paul Witzkoske) is a field of simple horizontal stripes with a paw print in the upper left corner — a layout similar to the leather pride flag. The colors represent the furs of different bear species throughout the world as a sign of inclusivity. The flag is trademarked.

== Gallery ==
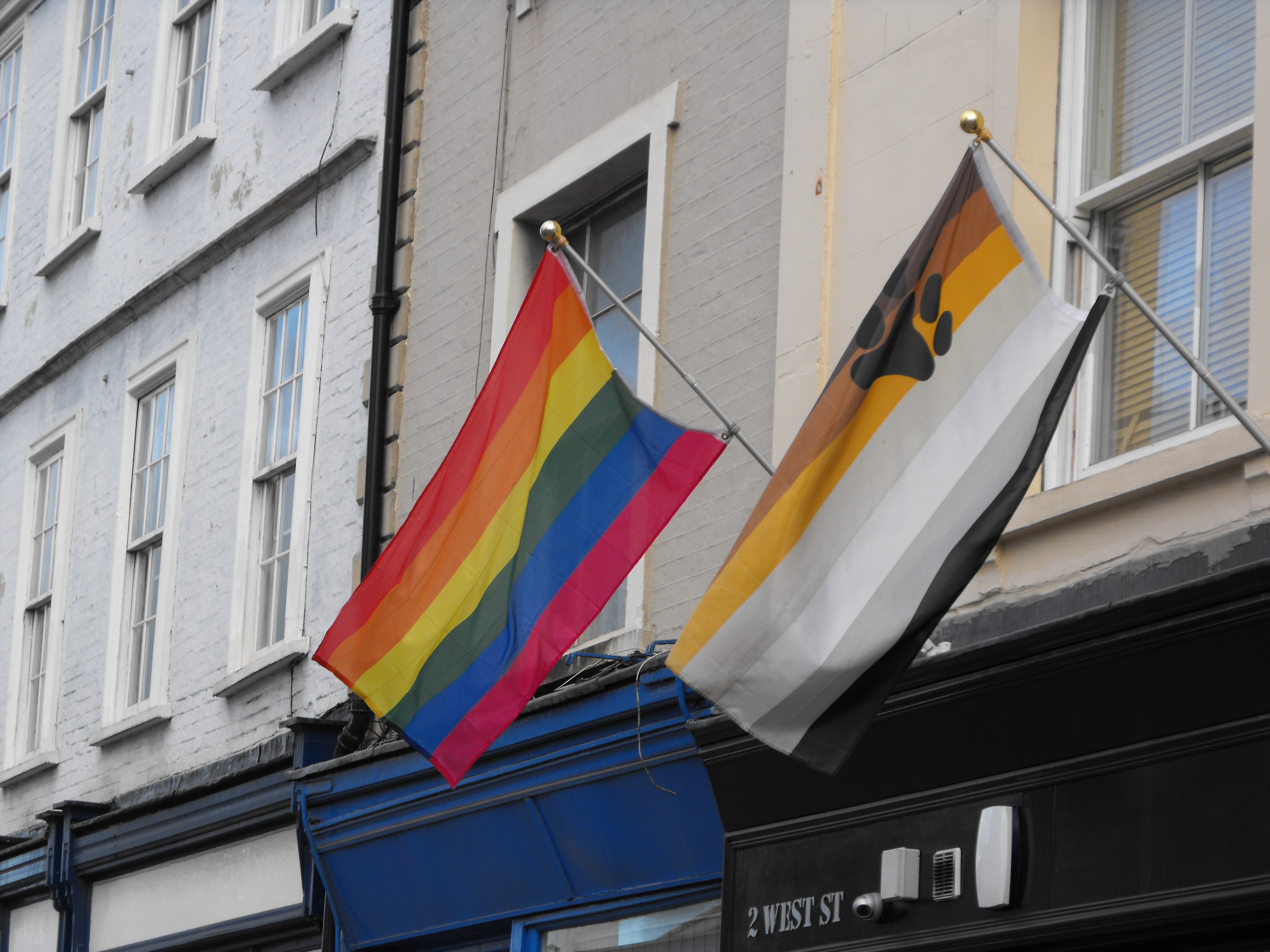
The bear flag flown next to the rainbow flag as an expression of bear and gay pride

An Australian version using the bear paw from the Brotherhood flag

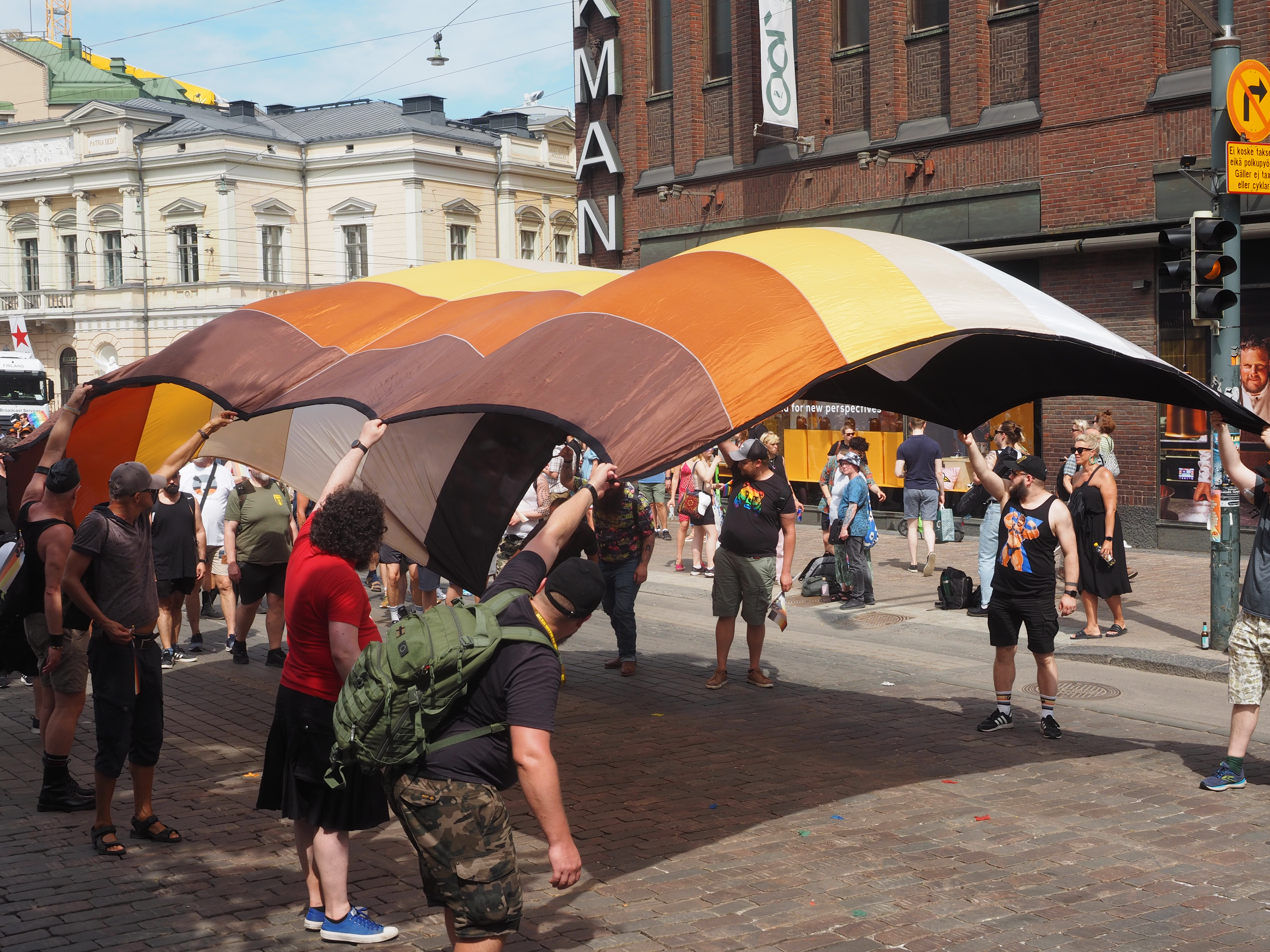
The bear flag flown at the Helsinki Pride parade in 2022

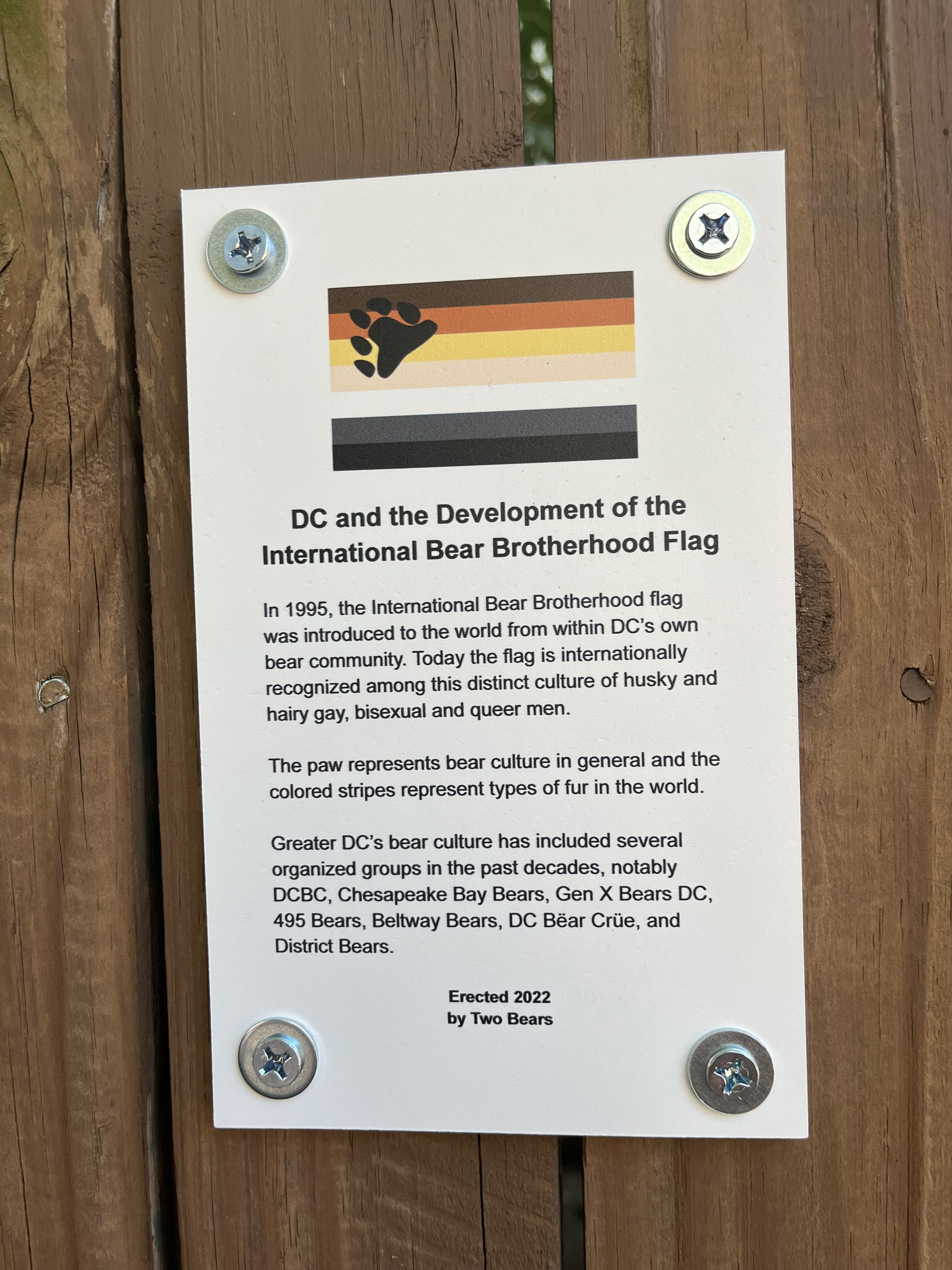
This historical marker in Washington, DC shares local history of the bear flag and bear fraternal organizations

== Other ==
An International Bear Pride tartan was registered with the Scottish Register of Tartans in 2015. It is based on the colors of the bear flag.

== See also ==
- LGBTQ symbols
- Rainbow flag
