= Chris Nelson (photographer) =

American photographer (1960–2006)

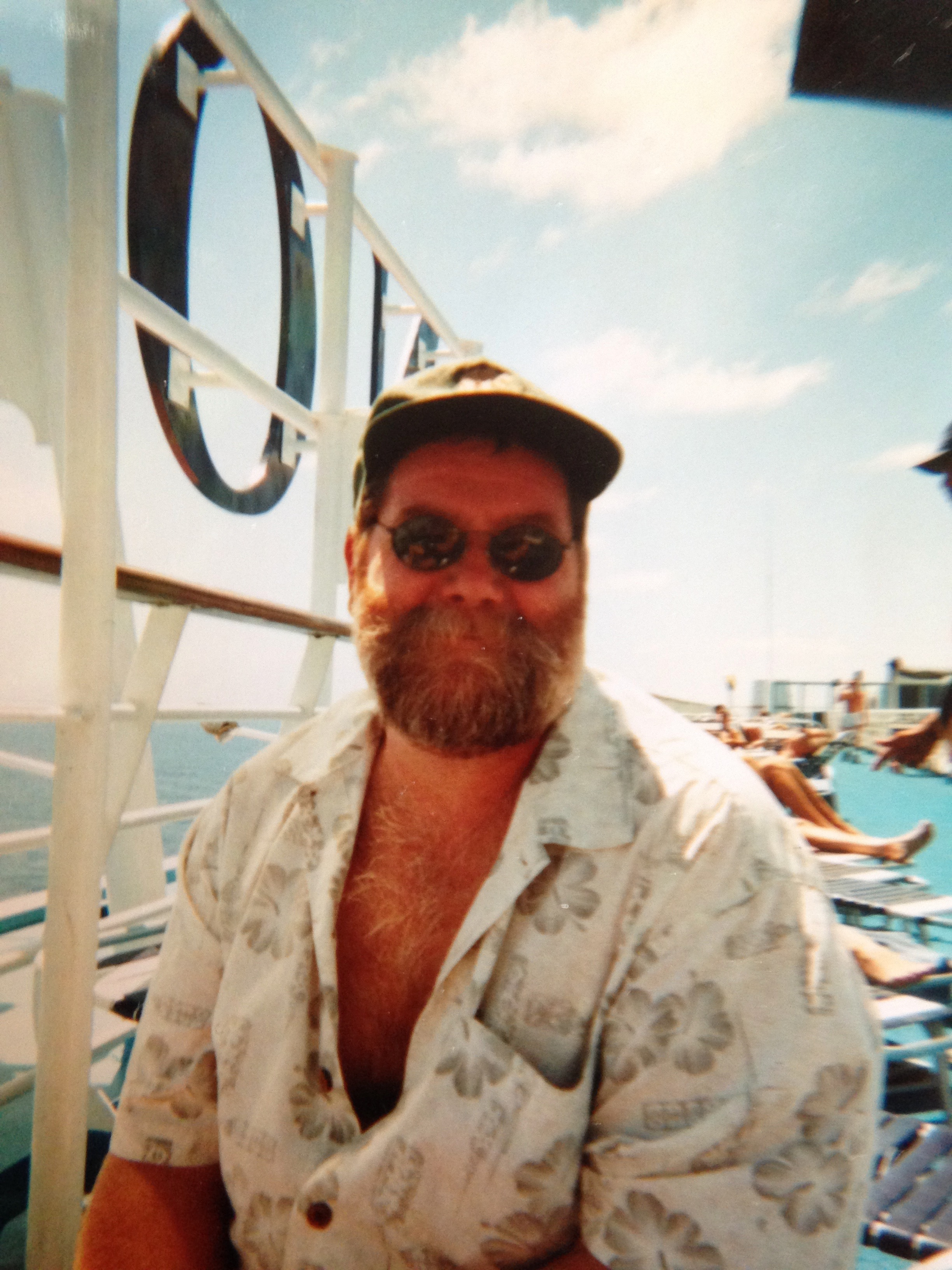
- Nelson in 2001
- Born: Edmund Christian Nelson; 1960
- Died: December 7, 2006 (aged 46); San Francisco Bay Area
- Occupation: Photographer
- Known for: Co-founder of Bear Magazine

Edmund Christian Nelson (1960 – December 7, 2006) was an American photographer and co-founder of Bear Magazine in the 1980s, was the photographic pioneer in the gay-oriented erotic photography of mature men with hairy bodies and facial hair. His work directly led to the legitimizing of the bear community as a social group.

By profession, Nelson was a photomicroscopy researcher at the University of California's Lawrence Berkeley Labs. He was considered a highly adept microscopist at the Lab, with one colleague there noting, "Chris was the backbone of NCEM, the kind of person that makes LBL great. He was an awesome microscopist who understood advanced electron microscopes like a test pilot understands a jet plane." Many international researchers appreciated Nelson's eye for detail and often requested to work with him given his reputation and skill level.

Together with his then partner, magazine publisher Richard Bulger, Nelson developed a characteristic "look", first in black-and-white portraits of men in San Francisco's biker and leather community, and then, as the bear community grew, in black-and-white erotic portraits of a great number of men who submitted themselves to the magazine as amateur models. He later independently galvanized the gay bear identity, which evolved over the years into a multitude of bear clubs and related social groups worldwide.

"Chris brought about a whole new gay subculture that allowed bigger, bearded, and hairy gay men to be celebrated. Before that, the emphasis was on the lean, leather jacket and t-shirt wearing 'Castro clones' that dominated the San Francisco scene. Now there was room for everyone, even the more forwardly masculine, non-svelte."

Nelson's photography was the sole subject of a 1991 book The Bear Cult: Photographs by Chris Nelson

At 46, he died of a heart attack in the San Francisco Bay Area on December 7, 2006.

Nelson's book and photography are discussed by author Jack Fritscher in Bears on Bears: Interviews & Discussions, Ron Suresha's 2002 nonfiction book on the bear community.(ISBN 1555835783). Fritscher also comments on Nelson's work in the introduction to The Bear Book 2, edited by Les K. Wright.
