= Samson (magazine) =

Monthly Japanese magazine for gay men

- Type: Incentive K.K.
- Industry: magazine
- Founded: 1982; Japan
- Headquarters: Japan
- Website: Samson website

Samson (月刊サムソン) is a monthly Japanese magazine for gay men.

Gay magazines in Japan, along with much gay culture, are segregated by "type"; most are aimed at an audience with specific interests. Samson specializes in daddies, older, chubby men and salarymen in suits and occasionally fundoshi, or traditional Japanese loincloths.

== Overview ==
Samson was started in 1982. The magazine features photographs and drawings which, while they feature explicit depictions of sex, are censored in accordance with Japanese law to obscure genitals and pubic hair.

Like G-men, Samson has fewer general articles than other magazines such as Barazoku and more short fiction and serialized stories. Each month there are community listings, several different stories—often pornographic—and several in comic form as well, and advertisements from gay-related and gay-friendly businesses such as day spas, clubs and hotels, bars, cafes and restaurants, host bars (hustler bars), brothels, and so forth.

Readers can also place personal ads free of charge, and each month there are several pages of these, most from men in search of romantic attachments, friends or sex partners. Such ads have long been a popular way for gay men to meet each other in Japan, though text messaging and the internet are probably more popular now.

The magazine is printed in Japanese only.
