= Butch (gay slang) =

Term for a hypermasculine man

In gay men's slang, butch refers to a hypermasculine man. The term may be used to describe either gay or straight men. Butch grew in popularity throughout the 20th century, especially in the 1970s with gay liberation and ballroom culture in the United States. Butch is used in drag culture, with terms such as butch queen.

The use of butch by gay men is similar to butch in lesbian slang, but it has its own definitions and usage.

== Definition and related terms ==
Broadly, butch is used in LGBTQ communities to describe a person's masculine gender presentation or performance. With gay men, the term often evokes hypermasculinity. The term is related to, and may be seen as comparable to, lesbian butch identity. While butch men often adhere to gender norms, butch women transgress them and may be more likely to be subjected to violence for their gender presentation.

In his 1972 dictionary Gay Talk, in addition to the lesbian definition, Bruce Rodgers provided a 1940s definition of butch: "nonhomosexual man whose virile appearance both draws and repels the homosexual (repels because of the danger of the violence if the butch is enraged by a gay proposition". According to Shaun Cole, post–gay liberation, the term butch may be used in tongue-in-cheek ways to note masculine behavior seen as a "performance".

In a 2009 study, researchers found that 58% of gay men surveyed defined a "masculine/'butch'" man as having a stereotypically masculine personality and stereotypically masculine physical traits, and 22% of those surveyed defined the category as "'straight-acting' or passing for a heterosexual man".

The term butch is often cited as the opposite of the terms fem or femme and swish or nelly. The term may be placed in opposition to bitch, with the latter referring to the bottom or receptive partner in penetrative sex. Butch differs from trade, "which denotes a casual sexual partner, [and] can apply to someone who is ostensibly heterosexual (possibly a male prostitute), but can also mean someone who is gay and available for sex".

== History ==
The slang term butch is believed to be an abbreviation for "butcher". Emerging in the United States in the early 1900s and meaning "tough kid", the term was likely inspired by Butch Cassidy. According to linguist Paul Baker, butch as slang for 'masculine' is most likely derived from around this time as well. Both Baker and Bruce Rodgers posit that the term comes from or is related to butch cut, a closely cropped haircut.

Among other American slang terms, butch emerged in British Polari slang around the time of World War II. Baker has suggested that this occurred due to relationships between British and American men, particularly in London where United States Air Force servicemen were stationed. According to researcher Shaun Cole, butch was historically "applied by gay men to masculine (straight) men seen as desirable".

Prior to the gay liberation movement in the early 1970s, "there was significant tension between butch masculinity and more feminized homosexuality"; this tension was alleviated among mainstream gay men as "activists rejected the belief that gay men were womanly".

In 1970, gay humorist Clark Henley published The Butch Manual. According to Mica Hilson, the book is a tongue-in-cheek guide to gay male behavior that advises that butch gay men "adopt a rhetorical style that safeguards against the exposure of emotional vulnerability", as "language is as much a part of the butch man's drag as the sunglasses he wears to hide his gaze or the mustache he grows to cover up his facial expression". The Butch Manual also reflected clone presentation, which grew in popularity throughout the 1970s. Through clone style, gay men expressed a hypermasculine, macho image. Clones also portrayed butchness as a form of camp, which had previously been characterized by stereotypical hyper-femininity.

By the mid 1980s, butch presentation had become less popular.

=== Drag culture ===
At drag balls in the 1930s, contestants competed in gender "realism" categories such as "butch realism" or "femme realism", with Shaun Cole writing: "In the 'butch-real' competition, the idea is for a drag queen to disguise himself as a heterosexual homeboy so convincingly – in backward baseball cap, baggy pants, and sweatshirt worn with a swagger – that he could walk his neighborhood streets without being found out as gay."

In American ballroom culture in the 1970s and 1980s, the category butch queens applied to a cisgender gay men whose presentation ranged from hyperfeminine to hypermasculine. Performing as drag queens, cisgender gay men were in the category butch queens up in drag. The category butch generally applied to transgender men or some masculine women; transgender women competed as femme queens.
