= Girth & Mirth =

Fat acceptance gay subculture

Girth & Mirth (G&M) is an organized network of social groups for a gay subculture based on positive attitudes towards larger bodies. First formed in San Francisco in 1976, early chapters were established in Boston and New York. Girth & Mirth gatherings were predecessors of the Convergence events, launched by the national Affiliated Bigmen's Club (ABC) in 1986, and collaboratively organized with various G&M chapters in subsequent years. The popularity of Girth & Mirth clubs led to a broader chubby culture that intersected with bear groups in the early 1990s. Over time Girth & Mirth chapters overlapped with, or became absorbed by, ABC, which itself was renamed the Big Gay Men's Organization (BGMO) in 2013.

== See also ==
- Fat men's club
- National Association to Advance Fat Acceptance
