= Bear (gay culture) =

LGBTQ slang and cultural identifier for large, hairy men

The International Bear Brotherhood Flag, the bear community's pride flag, created by Craig Byrnes in 1995.

In LGBTQ slang, a bear is a person who identifies with the bear subculture. Bears are typically overweight or muscular gay or bisexual men with a large build and/or body hair. The slang is often viewed as the antonym of the term twink, and acts as an identifier for the bear community.

The bear movement formed in the 1980s in San Francisco in reaction to larger men's exclusion from mainstream gay men's spaces and normative male beauty standards, and was often characterized by the rejection of effeminate and youth-focused gay culture. Members of bear culture organize dedicated social clubs, events, bars and media.

Bear culture has diversified and evolved over time, with ongoing debate in bear communities about what constitutes a "bear". Some bears continue to place importance on traditional masculinity and may disdain or shun effeminacy, while others consider acceptance and inclusion to be an important value of the community, including wider acceptance of transgender men and non-binary people as bears.

== History ==
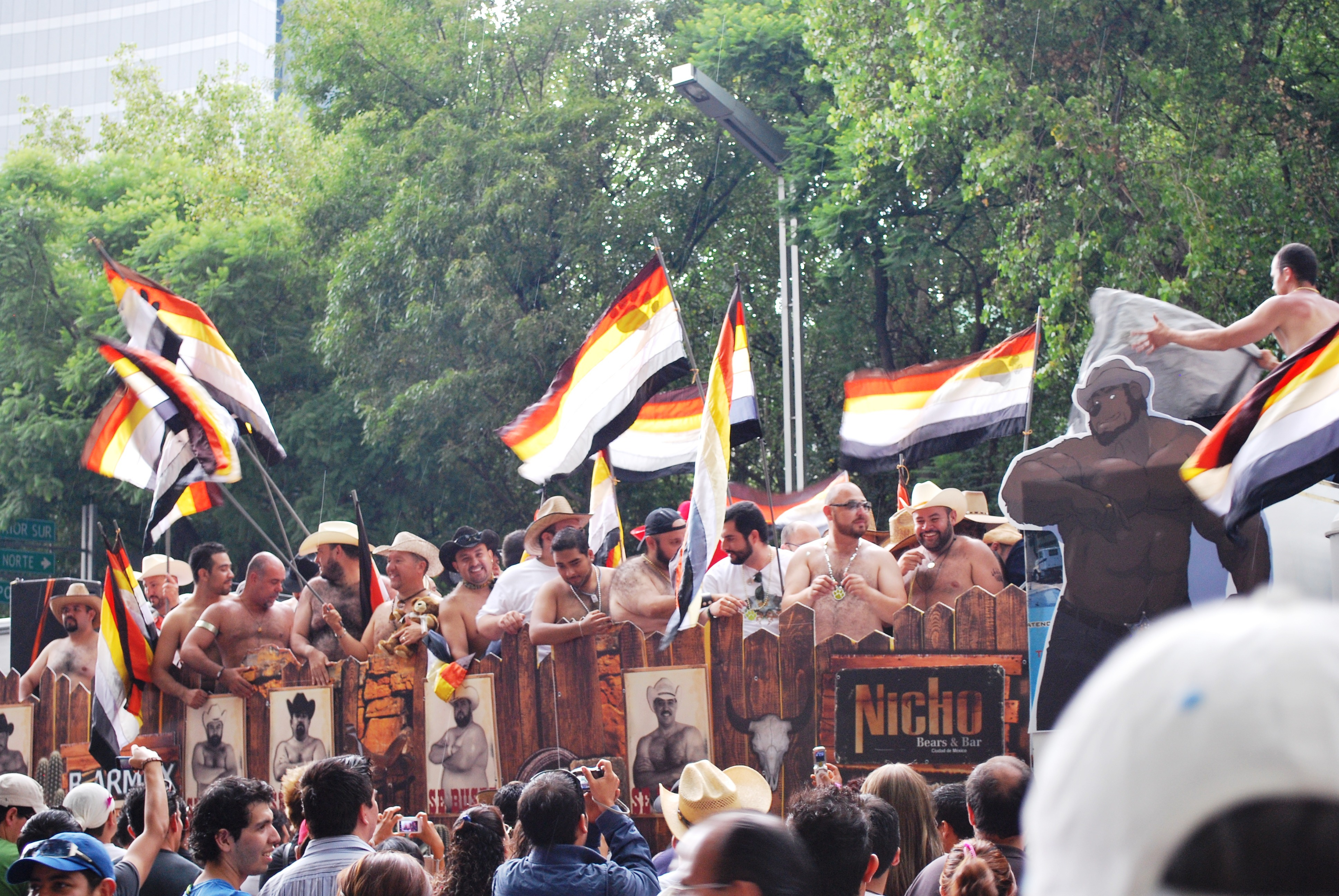
Bears at the 2009 Marcha Gay in Mexico City

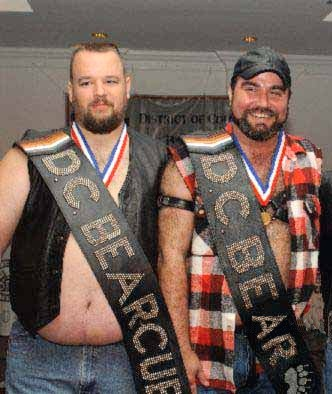
Mr. DC Bear Cub 2006 and Mr. DC Bear 2006

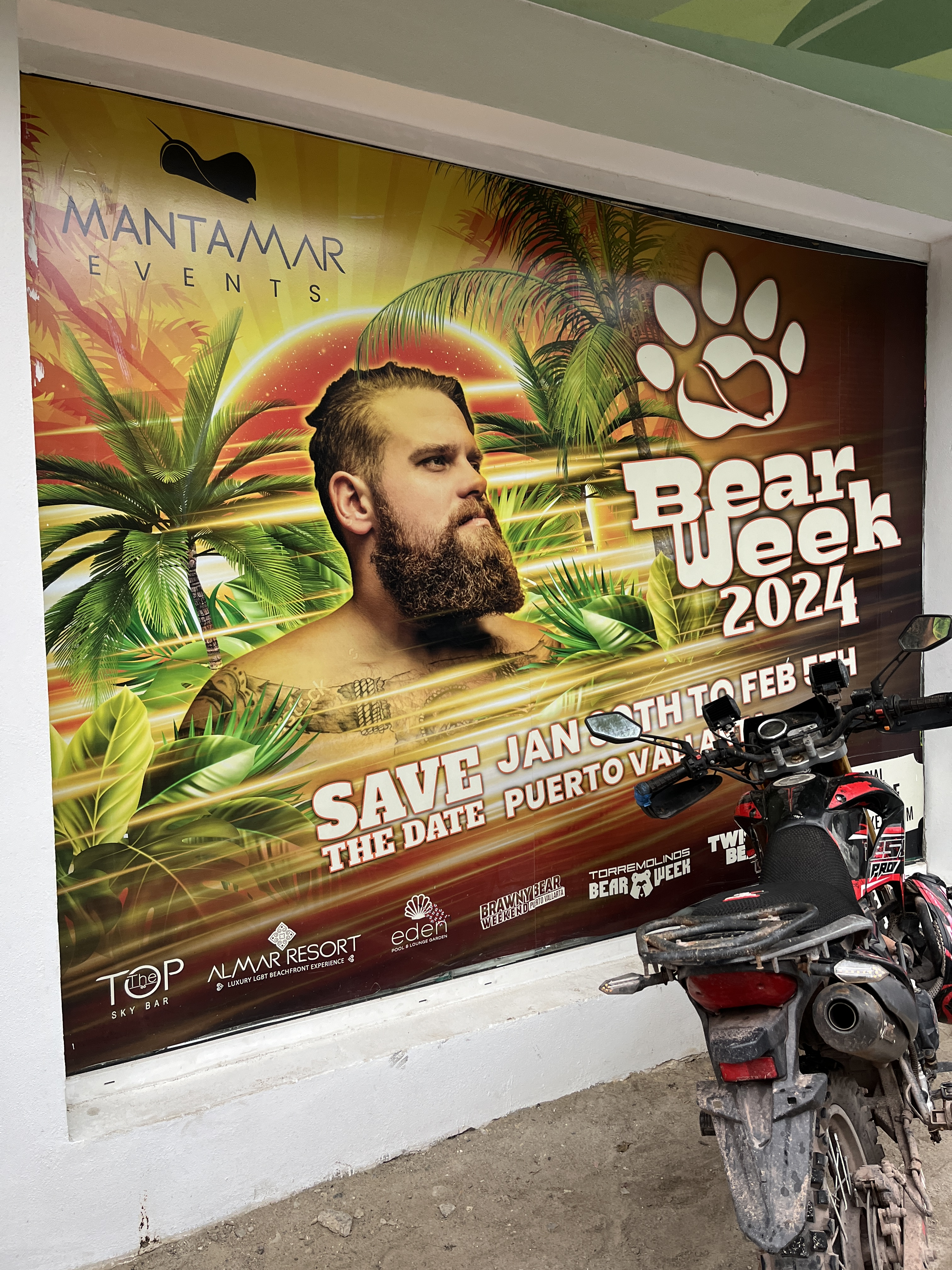
Advertisement for Bear Week at Almar Resort and Mantamar Beach Club Bar & Sushi in Puerto Vallarta, Mexico, 2024

=== Origin ===
The first written use of the term bear in relation to gay people occurred as early as 1966 in meeting minutes of a Los Angeles dance hall which described a "bear club". Arguably, the first published use of the slang term bear to describe a gay man was by George Mazzei in his 1979 article for The Advocate called "Who's Who in the Zoo?", which characterized gay men as seven types of animals, including bears:

Bears are usually hunky, chunky types reminiscent of railroad engineers and former football greats. They have larger chests and bellies than average, and notably muscular legs. Some Italian-American Bears are leaner and smaller; it's attitude that makes a Bear.

In the mid-1980s, gay men in the San Francisco Bay Area who called themselves "bears" met informally at Bear Hug (sex) parties and via the newly emerging Internet. The term "bear" was popularized by Richard Bulger, who, along with his then-partner Chris Nelson, founded Bear Magazine in 1987.

=== Bear clubs and contests ===
At the onset of the bear movement, some bears separated from the gay community at large, forming "bear clubs" to create social and sexual opportunities of their own. Many clubs are loosely organized social groups; others are modeled on leather biker-patch clubs, with a strict set of bylaws, membership requirements, and charities.

Bear clubs often sponsor large yearly events – "bear runs" or "bear gatherings" – like the annual events such as Béar Féile in Dublin, Ireland; BeefDip in Puerto Vallarta, Mexico; Southern HiBearNation in Melbourne; Bear Pride and Bear Essentials in Sydney; Bearstock in Adelaide; Orlando Bear Bash; Southern Decadence in New Orleans; San Francisco Bear Weekend; CBL's Bear Hunt; Bear Pride in Chicago; Atlanta Bear Pride; Bear Week in Provincetown, Massachusetts (since 2001); and Texas Bear Round Up in Dallas.

"Sociology of the Urban Gay Bear", written by Les K. Wright, was the first article to appear in print, in Drummer magazine, edited by Jack Fritscher. Fritscher was the founding editor of San Francisco's California Action Guide (1982). With California Action Guide, Fritscher became the first editor to publish the word "bear" with the gay culture meaning on a magazine cover (November 1982).

As well, with producer Mark Hemry in 1984, Fritscher co-founded the pioneering Palm Drive Video featuring homomasculine entertainment. Palm Drive Video expanded in 1996 to Palm Drive Publishing, San Francisco. For Palm Drive, Fritscher wrote, cast, and directed more than 150 video features. His work includes documentary footage of the first bear contest (Pilsner Inn, February 1987). A bear contest is a feature at many bear events, a sort of masculine beauty pageant awarding titles and sashes (often made of leather) to winners. This footage is no longer for sale as Fritscher declined to shift to DVD format and he closed the video company.

One example of a bear contest was International Mr. Bear, formerly held each February at the International Bear Rendezvous in San Francisco. It attracted contestants, often with local titles, from all over the world. The first International Mr. Bear was held in 1992, and the last was held in 2011. The contest included Bear, Daddy, Cub, and Grizzly titles with the contestant who received the highest score winning the bear title, regardless of what type he was. Example: "Mr. Washington, D.C. Bear, 2006". Gay "leather-bears" have competed in leather contests, and "muscle-bears" are another subculture noted by their muscular body mass.

=== History projects and spreading of bear culture ===
The Bear History Project, founded by Les L. Wright in 1995, documented the emergence and early evolution of bear identity and bear community. It became the source material for much of The Bear Book (1999) and The Bear Book II (2001). Publication of The Bear Book led to the Library of Congress adding "bear" as a category. The Bear History Project is archived in the Human Sexuality Collection at Cornell University. It continues to be added to.

The bear community has spread all over the world, with bear clubs in many countries. Bear clubs often serve as social and sexual networks for their members, who can contribute to their local gay communities through fund-raising and other functions. Bear events have become very common, to include smaller-sized cities and many rural areas. Most gay-oriented campgrounds now include some type of bear-related event during their operating season.

As more gay men have identified themselves as bears, more bars, especially leather or western bars, have become bear-friendly. Some bars cater specifically to bear patrons.

== Characteristics ==
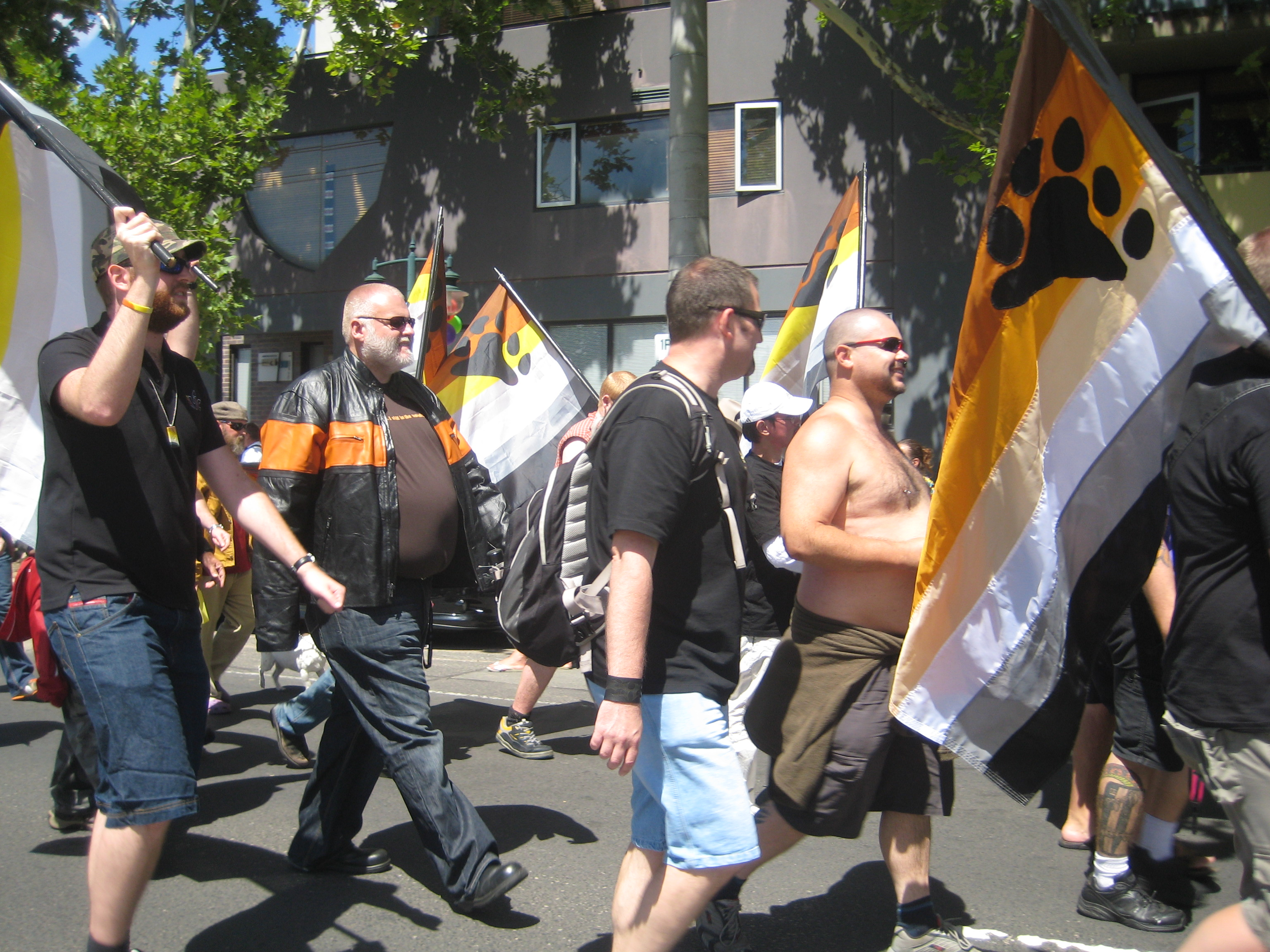
Bears marching in Melbourne's Pride March 2011

Jack Fritscher notes that bears celebrate "secondary sexual characteristics of the male: facial hair, body hair, proportional size, baldness."

While bears have typically been cisgender men, since the late 2000s transgender men, male-presenting non-binary people, and cisgender women who identify as bears have been more widely recognized in the culture. In 2025, the Mr Australasia Bear competition in Melbourne, Australia crowned its first transgender titleholder, Jeb Maihi Brown, who was one of two transgender competitors to also have won their respective local competitions for the first time.

== Representation in media ==
A variety of media has been established specifically to cater to bears. As the bear community has matured, so has its music and literature, as well as other (non-pornographic) arts, media, and culture. Examples include Bearapalooza, a traveling bear music festival; Bear Bones Books, an imprint of LGBTQ publisher Lethe Press, which markets fiction, nonfiction, and poetry titles written by and for bears; BearRadio.net, which streams bear and LGBT music and bear-themed podcast shows. "Bear Icons, the first bear-themed art exhibit (1999–2002), toured to Boston, Provincetown, New York City, and Washington, DC. The larger organized bear runs often host a "bear market" area where artisans, musicians, and others offer items for sale. There are also social media websites and smartphone apps that market to men of the bear community.

The Internet comic strip Bear with Me centers around the life of the bear Andy McCubbin, a rich entrepreneur and heir to the Howell/McCubbin fortune, and his friends and family. A vast majority of the other characters are also bears. The comics are created by Tim Vanderburg under the pen name Bruin. In Tim Barela's comic strip Leonard & Larry, a majority of the male characters are bearded men, some self-identified as bears, most not. The webcomic Blur the Lines frequently features bearish men and the two main characters, Rick and Drew, associate with the bear community; the former identifies as a chub, whereas the latter identifies as a chaser/cub. (See below for term definitions.) The events and characters depicted in the strip are inspired by the life of the author and artist Bob Kusiak, who is also involved to some extent with the bear community.

Films depicting the bear community include BearCity, BearCity 2: The Proposal and Cachorro, and the comedy web series Where the Bears Are, BULK: The Series, and Skeleton Crew.

In 2012, Bear World Magazine was first published online in monthly PDF format. The magazine was the first lifestyle magazine for the bear community, offering an alternative from the beefcake and pornographic magazines in print. Over the years, Bear World Magazine has grown into the world's leading bear lifestyle magazine, having transformed into a popular news and magazine website.

=== Adult entertainment ===
The bear community constitutes a specialty niche in the commercial market. It offers T-shirts and other accessories as well as calendars and pornographic films and magazines featuring bear icons, e.g., Jack Radcliffe. Catalina Video has a bear-themed line, the "Furry Features Series". Other adult studios which feature bear-type men are Bear Magazine, 100% BEEF Magazine, BearFilms, Bear, Butch Bear, Raging Stallion, and Titan Media.

== Art and popular culture ==
The December 2007 issue of Instinct featured an article by writer and director Kevin Smith on its "The Last Word" page. Smith wrote about his gay brother Don and about his (Kevin's) being on the cover of A Bear's Life magazine and the related cover story, and his feelings about being a "bear icon" in the gay community. Smith later made a cameo appearance in the 2012 film BearCity 2: The Proposal, playing himself in a brief conversation with a main character who works in the film industry.

In 2013, gay singer-songwriter Tom Goss released his song "Bears", singing about the bear community's open-mindedness and size-inclusivity.

The San Francisco South of Market Leather History Alley consists of four works of art along Ringold Alley honoring leather culture; it opened in 2017. One of the works of art is metal bootprints along the curb which honor 28 people (including T. Michael "Lurch" Sutton, biker and co-founder of the Bears of San Francisco) who were an important part of the leather communities of San Francisco.

== Symbols ==
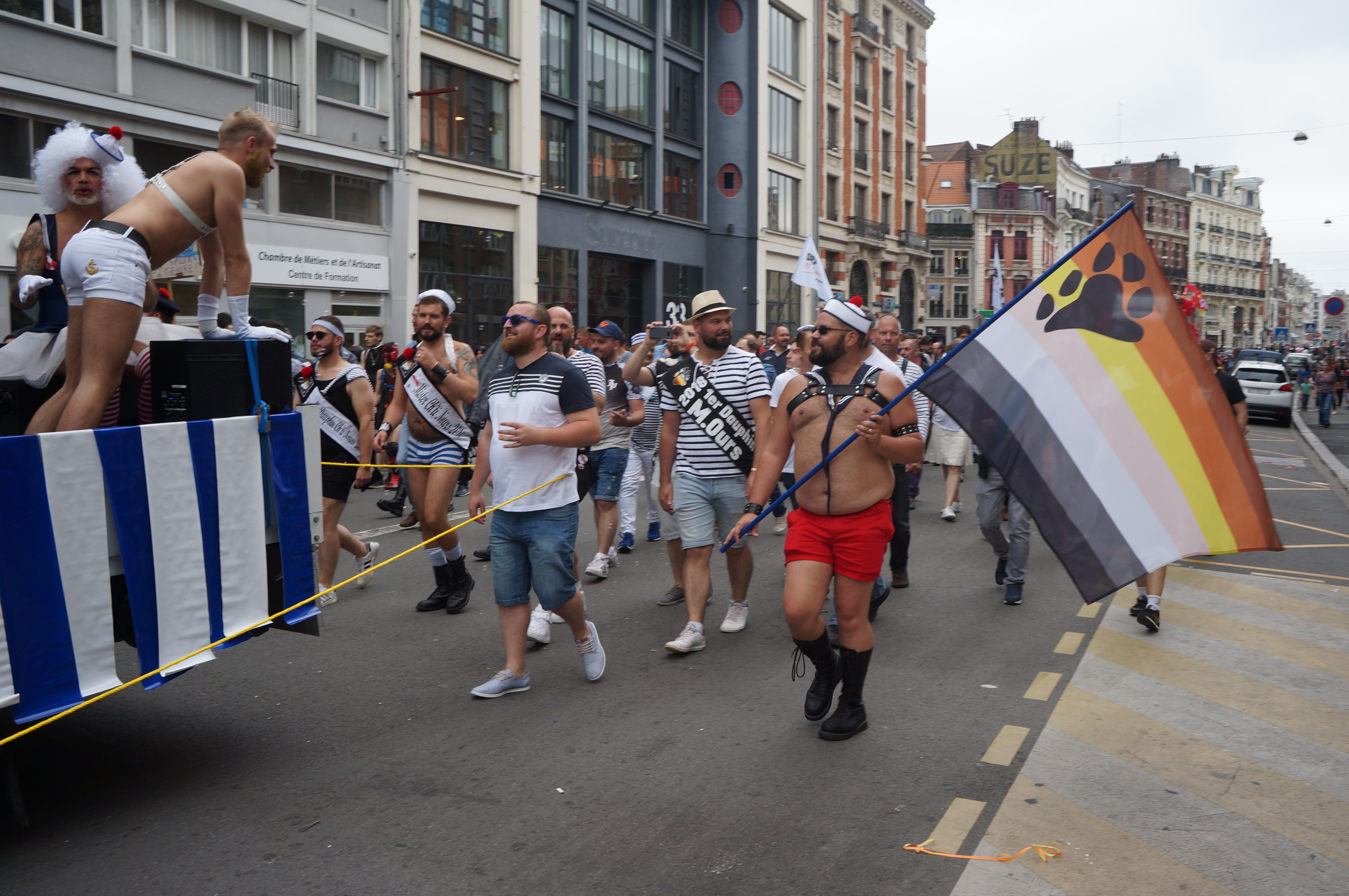
A pride parade at which the International Bear Brotherhood Flag is being carried.

The International Bear Brotherhood Flag is the pride flag of the bear community. Craig Byrnes created this flag in 1995.

An International Bear Pride tartan was registered with the Scottish Register of Tartans in 2015. It is based on the colors of the International Bear Brotherhood Flag.

== Analysis ==
A 2015 study found bears were more likely than other gay men to engage in condomless anal sex with a high number of casual sex partners, which is concerning due to anal sex being the act with the highest rate of sexually transmitted infections, especially HIV. The study also found that bears were more likely than other gay men to have low self-esteem, which is a catalyst for their higher rates of risky sexual behavior and substance abuse.

Many claim discrimination has increased within the bear community, as some men who self-identify as "bears" or "muscle bears" do not welcome higher-body fat men (see chub) at their events. A common criticism of the bear community is that some self-described bears tend to exclude men who do not fit their standards of a "real bear". Fat (or lack of it) is seen by some as a political issue, some of whom see their overweight condition as a form of self-acceptance.

Some also note a lack of racial diversity in mainstream bear culture, generally perceiving hirsuteness to be a standard of physical attractiveness that genetically favors white men aesthetically, socially and sexually among bears. Some bears of color have been vocal about the greater bear community's lack of racial diversity, with subgroups formed so they feel more comfortable and seen.

Some observers have noted a tendency toward body-type segmentation within the bear community. At bear social events, subgroups such as muscle bears, leather bears, daddy bears, and chub bears often cluster together, primarily socializing within their own identities rather than mixing broadly across the community.

In 2025, Belly of the Beast: The Politics of Anti-Fatness and Anti-Blackness author Da'Shaun L. Harrison argued that "muscle bears" who are not fat themselves have come to dominate Black chub and bear social spaces. Other bears or chubs see these men as the most desirable romantic or sexual partners present, disrupting bears' acceptance of different body types, which historically worked against the lookism of dominant American society.

== Terminology ==
Slang terms relating to the bear community include:

- Big Boy – An Afrocentric term for bears, particularly those of Black or African American heritage. Similar to chubs, big boy culture may be considered distinct, if related to, bear culture.
- Chub – A heavy-set man who might be described as overweight or obese. These men are also a distinct subculture within the gay community, and may or may not identify with the bear movement.
- Chubby Chaser - A person of smaller or average build who has a strong attraction to overweight or obese people.
- Cub – A younger (or younger-looking) bear, sometimes (but not always) with a smaller frame.
- Otter – Considered a sub-variant of bear by some, an otter is a hairy and slim or small-framed man.
- Panda (or Panda bear) – A bear of Asian or Pacific Islander descent.
- Polar bear – An older bear whose facial and body hair is predominantly or entirely white or grey.
- Trans bear – A trans man who is hairy and heavy-set.
- Ursula – A lesbian bear.
- Wolf – A gay man with body and facial hair and a lean, muscular, athletic build.

== See also ==
- Bearforce 1
- Castro clone
- Circuit party
- Dad bod
- Fatphobia
- Gay bar
- Girth & Mirth
- Mythopoetic men's movement
- Party and play
- Sexual addiction
