= Castro clone =

LGBT slang term

Castro clone is slang for a homosexual man who appears in dress and style as an idealized working-class man. The term and image grew out of the heavily gay-populated Castro neighborhood in San Francisco during the late 1970s, when the modern LGBT rights movement, sparked by the 1969 Stonewall riots in New York City and the Summer of Love, gave rise to an urban community.

The first recorded usage of the term is from Arthur Evans's "Red Queen Broadsides", a series of posters he wheatpasted around the Castro at the time, in which he used it derisively to satirize what he saw as butch conformity among gay men. The look was most common from roughly the mid-1970s to around the mid-1980s. The Castro style regained popularity in the first decade of the 21st century, particularly among LGBT hipsters.

== Fashion ==
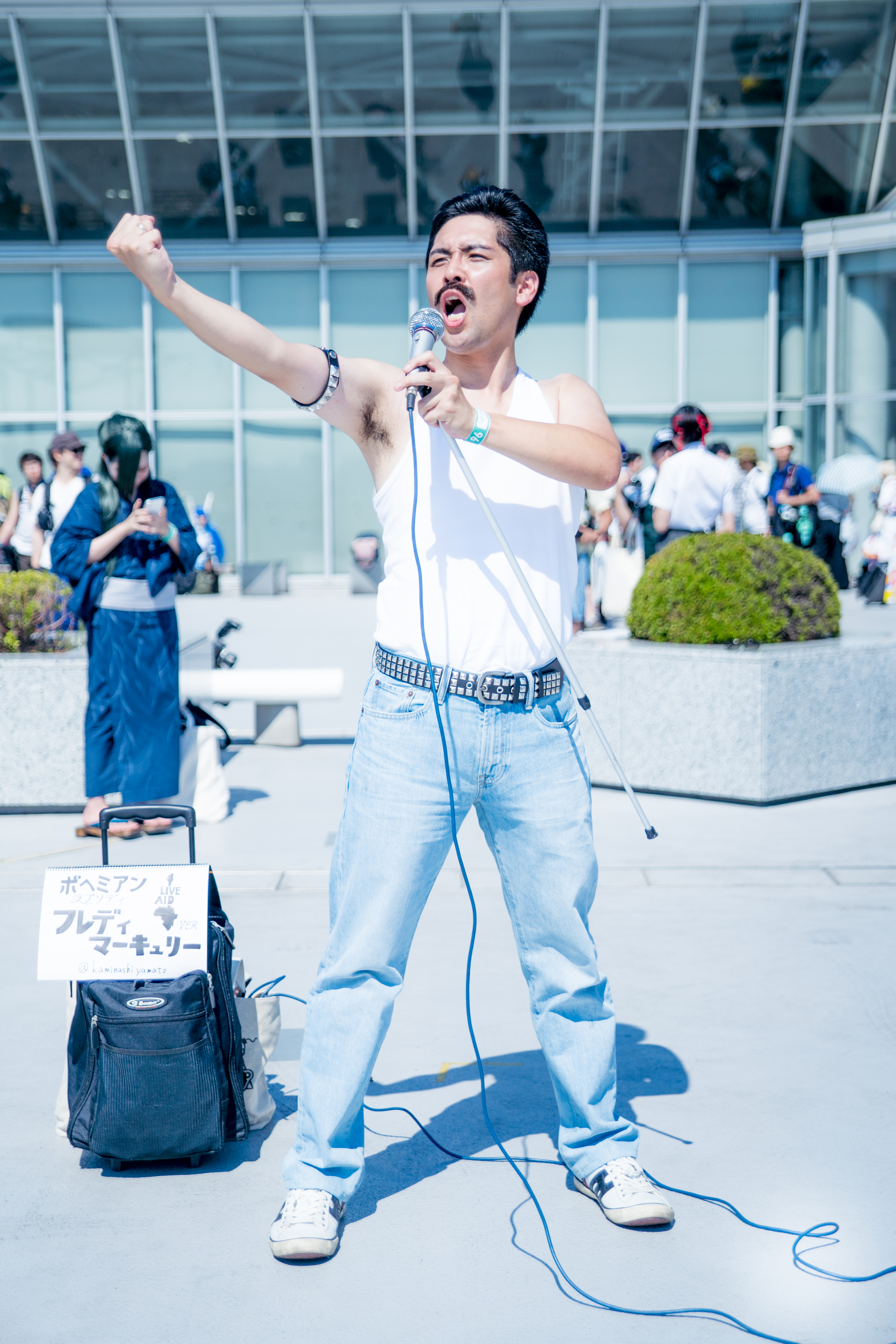
A Freddie Mercury cosplayer in Mercury's Castro clone look (which included heavy metal style studded belt and armband)

The Castro-clone appearance typically consisted of masculine attire such as uniforms, leather or Levi's jeans, and checked or plaid shirts. Typical of the look was a form-fitting T-shirt, shrink-to-fit denim trousers worn snugly (bell bottoms and low-rise jeans in the early 1970s, later more traditionally working-class 501s), sneakers or boots, and often a full moustache and sideburns.

Hair styles were relatively short, not a crew cut, but definitely something that would not blow in the wind or require much hair spray to hold it in place. The look was modelled heavily on the greasers of the 1950s and 1960s, which was also an influence on punk, heavy metal and fetish subcultures.

The elements of the look all served to emphasize the wearer's physical attributes, especially those associated with masculinity; those with buff body shapes believed that less clothing was often better, so that their hard work at the gym was evident. Gay men so frequently adopted this attire, at first when bar-hopping, that it soon became associated with males of the post-Stonewall gay community.

== History ==
Arising from the LGBT social movements of the late 1960s and 1970s, which allowed greater freedom of expression for non-heterosexual people than had previously been acceptable, this new freedom was represented in the imagery of movies and magazines of the time, inspiring a particular gay male style. With a greater acceptance of gay men, there was a fashion towards being seen and identified with the group.

Visual appearance was further inspired by the icons of masculinity portrayed in the works of homoerotic artists, such as Donelan and Tom of Finland, and can be seen in the "construction worker", "policeman", and leather-clad "biker" characters in the musical group Village People, as well as Al Parker, Richard Locke, Jack Wrangler, and other porn stars.

The combination of inexpensive, comfortable streetwear, with an emphasis on masculine attributes, yielded a gay look that was considered erotic and easy, yet suitable for non-gay venues. This enhanced LGBT recognition and facilitated the community's emergence from the closet in the late 20th century.

== Concept ==
According to sociologist Martin P. Levine, whose ethnography Gay Macho documented the clone subculture, the style expressed a gender-conformist masculinity that became, in his phrasing, "the first post-Stonewall form of homosexual life." Men who used this label might feel the need to maintain their sense of masculinity as well as 'looking the part'. For many men, the look was an outward sign of their freedom from social dicta and a celebration of their personal masculinity. Some fetishize the style while others find the appearance a sign of liberation, countering the homophobic stereotype that generalizes all gay men as effeminate.

With an influx of young gay people who felt free to express their sexual desires, a culture of idolizing masculinity emerged with rugged working-class men seen as one of the ideals, even if many of those men were actually middle-class professionals.

There was a period when the "clone look" was limited to the Castro District of San Francisco, but that period could not have been more than a few weeks. The emergence of the NYC-based gay monthly magazines in the mid-to-late 1970s (such as Mandate, Playguy, and Honcho) had much to do with inspiring the clone look in locations other than the Castro District. The magazines were filled with images of clones, both in feature spreads and advertisements. Gay porn films of the era also advanced the look.

The look continued to evolve through the 1980s and beyond, effectively influencing the rise of the bear culture, which expanded on the concept, converting mustaches to beards, emphasizing masculine body language as well as appearance, and embracing ex-footballer husky-to-chubby physiques. This contrasted with the more common subcultural spin-off of the Castro clone phenomenon, the twink evolution, which led to the slightly more sleek gym-and-diet-induced, slim musculature prized among gay urban men. This began in the mid-to-late 1980s, with men sporting fashions and hairstyles inspired by popular actors such as Rob Lowe and Don Johnson, as well as pop rock stars such as George Michael and Simon Le Bon.

== Criticism ==
The clone aesthetic was criticized as conformist and as a repudiation of anything regarded as effeminate. One of those who criticised the Castro clones was the gay singer Sylvester, who asserted that such clones often hassled him and were judgmental toward effeminate or flamboyant men.
