= Chub (gay slang) =

Slang term for an overweight gay man

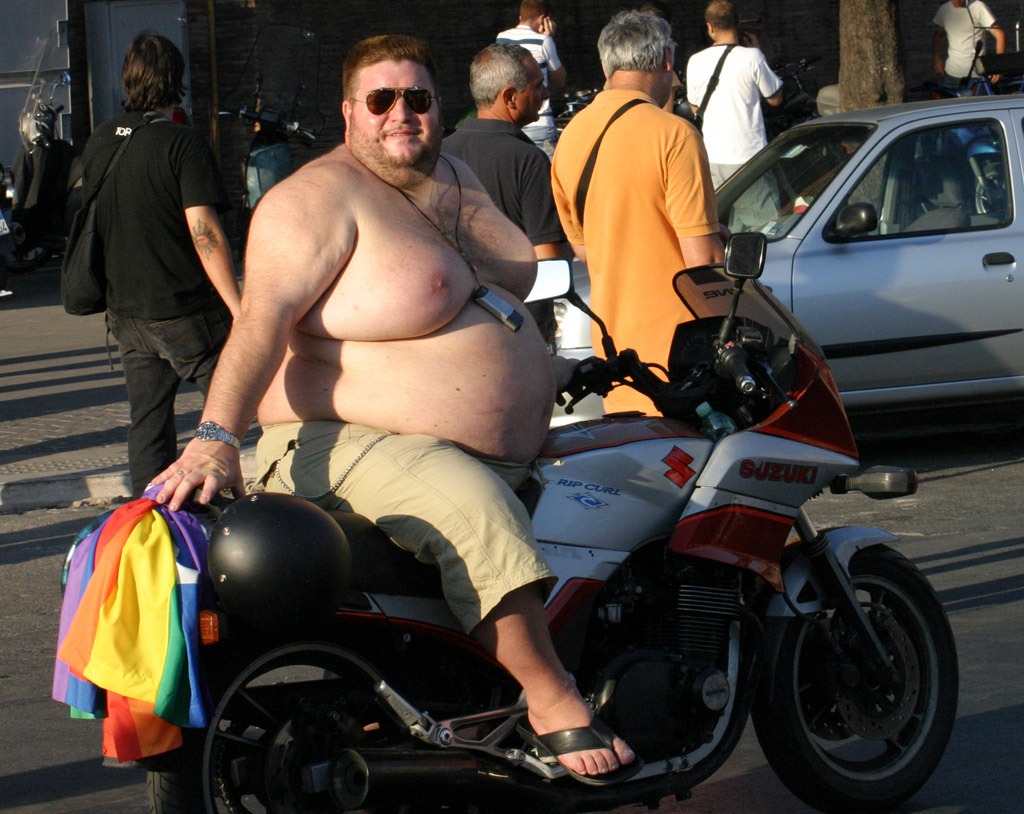
Chub riding a motorbike

A chub is an overweight or obese gay man who identifies as being part of the chubby culture. Although there is some overlap between chubs and bears, chubs have their own distinct subculture and community. There are bars, organizations and social events specifically catering to this subculture, which allows members of the community to socialize with each other and develop social networks.

In the last several years, large regional social events for gay chubs have developed. They often feature pageants in which titles are given to winners, such as "Mr. Chubby International" and "Mr. Chaser International". In the United States, there is an annual national event, Convergence, as well as several annual regional gatherings. There is also an annual event in Europe called European Big Men's Convergence. These events are held in different cities each year and are usually hosted by that city's local big men's organization. Japan has also had a large but relatively silent chub community, with Samson magazine being one of the oldest forms of Japanese media which focuses on Gay Chubs and others.

== Terminology ==
These definitions are general in nature; specific definitions may vary depending on the perspective of the individual.

- Chubby or chub – a large, overweight, or obese man (roughly 300 lb (140 kg))
- Superchub – a chub who is extremely large (between 400 and 600 lb (180 and 270 kg))
- Megachub – bigger superchub (usually drawings) (between 600 and 1,000 lb (270 and 450 kg))
- Bear – a man with a stocky or heavyset build; typically hairy body and facial hair; sometimes older (or older looking) and displaying a masculine appearance and mannerisms
- Chubby bear – a bear is someone who is particularly large; this term has risen in use as the term "bear" has become more mainstream and broadened to include smaller men. This terminology might also include chubby gay bear, encapsulating all the fat and gay men in minor culture
- Chaser or Wolf – someone who is sexually or romantically attracted to chubs or bears, but himself has a small body type. The term chaser is sometimes used in various communities to describe an outsider who is sexually attracted to people within the community
- Chub for chub (also referenced as chub4chub, internet shorthand) – a chub who is sexually or emotionally attracted to other chubby men
- Girth & Mirth – a formerly widespread name for clubs of big men and their admirers
- Big Men's Club – another term used to define clubs and organizations for gay and bisexual men and their male admirers
- BeefyFrat – was a popular gainer/feeder social network; it folded sometime around 2014, having been abandoned by its creator

Of note, the term chubby chaser can also be found in use among heterosexuals, most commonly referring to a man (usually thinner) who is sexually attracted to heavier, overweight, or obese women.

The chub subculture is often found to overlap with the bear subculture. Though there is no strict terminology which differentiates between the two groups, it may be noted that most Bears also associate themselves as chubs, though chubs may not necessarily associate themselves with the bear subculture.

== History ==
While casual social networks for chubby men and chasers had long existed, the first organized social group in the United States, Girth & Mirth, formed in 1976 in San Francisco. The following year, a chapter was organized in Boston, and in 1978 the New York chapter started. Conventions were held in cities such as San Francisco, Chicago, and New York City as early as 1977 or 1978 with large numbers of chubby men and chasers attending. Formally organized Convergence conventions in the United States were first held in Seattle in 1986. Several chapters are now active across the United States, mostly in larger, more diverse cities.

== See also ==
- Bear (gay slang)
- Fat fetishism

== Additional Links ==
- "Fat Gay Men: Girth, Mirth and the Politics of Stigma" by Jason Whitesel
