= Decoding COVID-19 =

2020 PBS documentary film

- Official film cover
- Genre: Documentary film
- Written by: Sarah Holt
- Directed by: Sarah Holt
- Narrated by: Craig Sechler
- Theme music composer: APM Music and Universal Production Music US
- Country of origin: United States
- Original language: English
- No. of episodes: 1

Production
- Producers: Sarah Holt, Jane Teeling, Caitlin Saks, David Borenstein, Ma Liyan
- Cinematography: Rob Lyall, Stephen McCarthy, Samuel Russell, Sun Xun, Joel Weber, Zachary Fink and Peter Fitzgerald
- Editors: Ralph Avellino, Ryan Shepheard, and Michael Amundson
- Running time: 1 h (60 min)
- Production company: Holt Productions

Original release
- Network: PBS
- Release: May 13, 2020

Decoding COVID-19 is a 2020 American PBS documentary television film from the American TV series, NOVA, that was released on May 13, 2020. The documentary film examines the COVID-19 pandemic over its initial six months, from its beginning in the last months of 2019 in Wuhan, Hubei, China to May 2020.

== Overview ==
SARS-CoV-2 is a coronavirus that causes COVID-19 disease, and has been responsible for a pandemic throughout the world. The film describes the history of the COVID-19 disease over its initial six months, from its beginning in the last months of 2019 in Wuhan, Hubei, China to May 2020. The film also presents the search for a safe and effective treatment. In addition, details of the effect of the disease on the human body at a microscopic level are described. According to film producer Julia Cort, "This film goes beyond the disease itself, telling a deeply human story of cooperation and innovation as scientists and researchers race to save lives in the face of a common enemy." According to producer Chris Schmidt, "This film examines an encouraging array of innovative new approaches that scientists are now pursuing to harness the immune system to fight back. And, we show how advances in genomics, combined with a new level of openness in sharing data and results among experts and health officials around the world, have greatly accelerated efforts."

== Participants ==
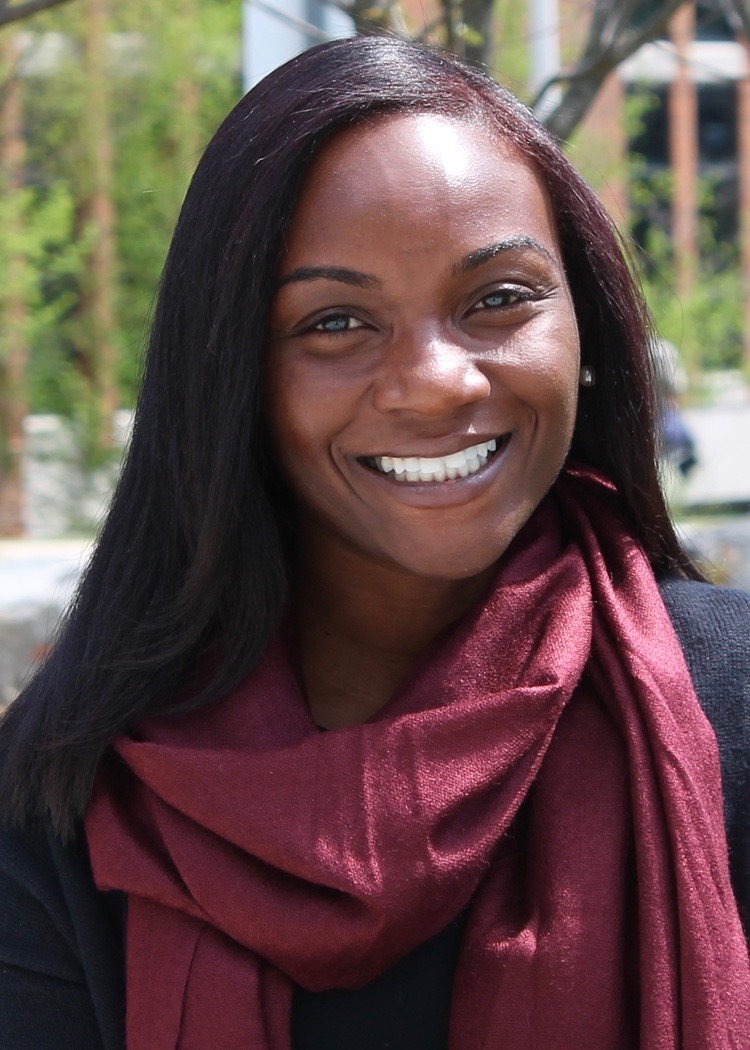
Kizzmekia Corbett

The documentary film includes the following participants (alphabetized by last name):

- Galit Alter, Ragon Institute of Massachusetts General Hospital, MIT, Harvard
- Dan Barouch, Ragon Institute of Massachusetts General Hospital, MIT, Harvard
- Nahid Bhadelia, Boston University School of Medicine
- Kizzmekia Corbett, National Institutes of Health (NIH)
- Ronald B. Corley, Boston University's National Emerging Infectious Diseases Laboratories (NEIDL)
- Rhiju Das, Stanford University
- Robert A. Davey, Boston University's National Emerging Infectious Diseases Laboratories (NEIDL)
- Michael Osterholm, University of Minnesota's Center for Infectious Disease Research and Policy
- David Pride, University of California, San Diego
- Liu Qi, 21-year-old university student who is among the first to contract the disease
- Craig Sechler, narrator
- Jeffrey Shaman, Columbia University
- Duane Wesemann, Harvard Medical School, and others

== See also ==
- COVID-19 pandemic by country and territory
- Emerging infectious disease – New or rapidly increasing disease
- Globalisation and disease
- List of epidemics and pandemics
- List of NOVA episodes
