= Margaret Ackerman =

American engineer

- Education: Brandeis University; Massachusetts Institute of Technology
- Scientific career
- Workplaces: Massachusetts General Hospital; Dartmouth College; College of Charleston
- Thesis: Targeting the tight junction : immunotherapy of colon cancer (2010)

Margaret Ackerman is an American engineer who is a professor at Dartmouth College. Ackerman develops high throughput tools to evaluate the antibody response in disease states. She oversees biological and chemical engineering in the Thayer School of Engineering.

== Early life and education ==
Ackerman was an undergraduate student at Brandeis University where she studied biochemistry. After earning her doctorate, she spent one year at the College of Charleston, where she taught chemistry. In 2004 she moved to the Massachusetts Institute of Technology for doctoral research. Her doctorate evaluated immunotherapy in the treatment of colorectal cancer. She was appointed a postdoctoral fellow at the Massachusetts General Hospital in 2010.

== Research and career ==
In 2011, Ackerman joined Dartmouth College as an assistant professor. She was promoted to professor in 2019. Her research considers the development of novel vaccines. Amongst these, she has worked on the development of vaccines to protect against HIV and Herpes simplex virus. Her vaccines look to make use of the innate immune system, the early response system that protects us from pathogens until our adaptive immune system responds. The ability of antibodies to recruit an innate immune response is known as the effector function. Ackerman has explored ways to engineer Regulatory T cells to target the fibrils that form in the neural tissue of people suffering from Parkinson's disease. She was awarded a Faculty Mentor Award in 2016.

During the COVID-19 pandemic, Ackerman studied the levels of antibodies in recovering COVID-19 patients. Specifically, she studied the levels of Immunoglobulin A (IgA) antibodies in their mucus. Her research identified that people who suffered from more mild cases of COVID-19 displayed increased levels of IgA. She also showed that there was an anti-correlation between levels of IgA and IgG, i.e., people with high IgA levels had low IgG levels.

In 2024, Ackerman signed a faculty letter expressing support for the actions of Dartmouth College president Sian Beilock, who ordered the arrests of 90 students and faculty members engaging in nonviolent protest against the Gaza war.

== Selected publications ==
- Ackerman, Margaret E.; Crispin, Max; Xiaojie Yu; et al. (2013). "Natural variation in Fc glycosylation of HIV-specific antibodies impacts antiviral activity". Journal of Clinical Investigation. 123 (5): 2183–2192. doi:10.1172/jci65708. PMC 3637034. PMID 23563315. S2CID 7515592. Wikidata Q36797342.
- Ackerman, Margaret E.; Moldt, Brian; Wyatt, Richard; et al. (2010). "A robust, high-throughput assay to determine the phagocytic activity of clinical antibody samples". Journal of Immunological Methods. 366 (1–2): 8–19. doi:10.1016/j.jim.2010.12.016. PMC 3050993. PMID 21192942. S2CID 33747259. Wikidata Q30498394. (Erratum: doi:10.1016/j.jim.2011.12.006, Wikidata Q110072731)
- Barouch, Daniel; Alter, Galit; Broge, Thomas; et al. (2015). "Protective efficacy of adenovirus/protein vaccines against SIV challenges in rhesus monkeys". Science. 349 (6245): 320–324. doi:10.1126/science.aab3886. PMC 4653134. PMID 26138104. Wikidata Q36300153.

=== Books ===
- Margaret E. Ackerman; Falk Nimmerjahn (2014). Antibody Fc: linking adaptive and innate immunity. London. ISBN 978-0-12-394818-2. OCLC 855505336.
