= Masters of the Universe (disambiguation) =

Masters of the Universe is a media franchise based on a line of toys produced during the 1980s by Mattel.

Masters of the Universe may also refer to:

== Mattel franchise ==
=== Films and TV series ===
- He-Man and the Masters of the Universe, an animated TV series produced from 1983 to 1985
- The New Adventures of He-Man, an early-1990s animated TV series based on He-Man and the Masters of the Universe characters
- He-Man and the Masters of the Universe (2002 TV series), a reboot of the 1983 animated series He-Man and the Masters of the Universe
- Masters of the Universe (1987 film), a live action feature film starring Dolph Lundgren and Frank Langella
- Masters of the Universe (TV series) (2021–2024), a revival, in 3-parts, of the 1983 animated series He-Man and the Masters of the Universe
- He-Man and the Masters of the Universe (2021 TV series), a remake of the 1983 animated series He-Man and the Masters of the Universe
- Masters of the Universe (2026 film), an American superhero film

=== Video games ===
- Masters of the Universe: The Power of He-Man, a 1983 game designed by Intellivision
- Masters of the Universe: The Super Adventure, an interactive fiction game released in 1987 by U.S. Gold
- Masters of the Universe: The Arcade Game, an arcade-style computer game released in 1987 by U.S. Gold
- Masters of the Universe: The Movie, 1987, (based on the Masters of the Universe film) from Gremlin Graphics

=== Other ===
- Masters of the Universe (comics), the various comics series
  - He-Man and the Masters of the Universe (2012 DC comic)
- The Masters of the Universe Role Playing Game, a 1985 role-playing game based on the Mattel franchise

== Music ==
- Masters of the Universe (Binary Star album), 2000
- Masters of the Universe (Hawkwind album), 1977
- Masters of the Universe (Pulp album), 1994
- "Masters of the Universe" (song), 2000, by Juno Reactor

== Other uses ==
- Masters of the Universe? NATO's Balkan Crusade, a 2000 book edited by Tariq Ali
- Masters of the Universe (book), 2012, on the topic of neoliberalism
- Masters of the Universe (MOTU), maintainers of the community-supported components of the Ubuntu operating system

== See also ==
- "Master of the Universe", high-flyers on Wall Street, a usage found in the Tom Wolfe novel The Bonfire of the Vanities and its film adaptation
- Master of The Universe (disambiguation)
- He-Man (disambiguation)
