= Heman (given name) =

Heman is a male given name. Notable people with the name include:

- Heman Allen (of Colchester) (1779–1852), U.S. Representative from Colchester, Vermont
- Heman Allen (of Milton) (1777–1844), U.S. Representative from Milton, Vermont
- Heman Bekele, Ethiopian American inventor and scientific researcher
- Heman Dass, Pakistani politician
- Heman L. Dowd (1887–?), American college football player and coach
- Heman Edward Drummond (1905–1956), American coal-magnate
- Heman Dyer (1810-1900), chancellor of the University of Pittsburgh
- Heman Gurung (born 1996), Nepalese international footballer
- Heman Humphrey (1779–1861), American author and clergyman
- Heman Lowry (1778-1848), American politician from Vermont
- Heman Luwang (born 1988), Indian cricketer
- Heman A. Moore (1809–1844), U.S. Representative from Ohio
- Heman J. Redfield (1788–1877), American politician from New York State
- Heman C. Smith (1850–1919), American Ladder-Day Saint leader
- Heman R. Smith (1795–1861), American military officer
- Heman Marion Sweatt (1912–1982), American civil rights activist
- Heman Swift (1733–1814), American Revolutionary War general and Connecticut Supreme Court justice

== See also ==
- Heman (disambiguation)
- Hemans (disambiguation)
