= Herschlag =

Herschlag or Hershlag is a Yiddish surname. Notable people with the surname include:

- Alex Herschlag, American television producer, writer and stand-up comedian
- Daniel Herschlag (born 1958), American biochemist
- Natalie Hershlag, known as Natalie Portman (born 1981), Israeli-American actress
