= Todd M. Allen =

Canadian-born immunologist and virologist (1970 – 2024)

Todd MacKenzie Allen
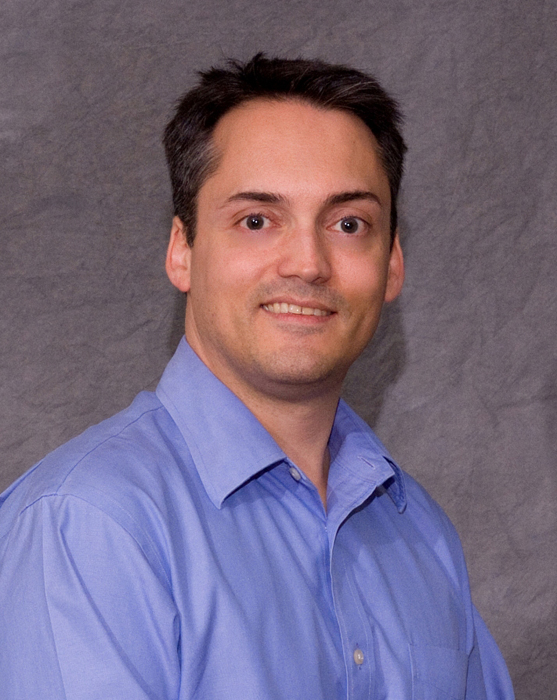
- Born: 1970; Canada
- Died: September 11, 2024 (aged 53–54)
- Citizenship: Canada, United States
- Education: Waterloo University; University of Wisconsin-Madison
- Scientific career
- Fields: Immunology, Virology, HIV
- Workplaces: Ragon Institute of MGH, MIT and Harvard, Harvard University

Todd Mackenzie Allen (1970 – 2024) was a Canadian-born immunologist and virologist at the Ragon Institute of MGH, MIT, and Harvard, and a Professor of Medicine at Harvard University. He was a specialist in HIV vaccine design and the sequence evolution and diversity of HIV and hepatitis C virus (HCV). Towards the end of his career, his work was focused on developing novel immunotherapeutic approaches towards a functional cure of HIV, including chimeric antigen receptor (CAR) T cell immunotherapy and gene editing approaches capable of protecting against HIV infection.

== Early life and education ==
Allen, the son of American parents, was born in St. Catharines, Ontario, Canada. He received his bachelor of science (BSc) in Biochemistry at the University of Waterloo before completing his PhD degree in Cellular and Molecular Biology at the University of Wisconsin – Madison studying T cell responses in the SIV infected macaque model of HIV infection. In 2001, he moved to Boston to join the Partners AIDS Research Center (now the Ragon Institute of MGH, MIT and Harvard).

== Research and career ==
In 2014, Allen was promoted to Professor of Medicine at Harvard Medical School (HMS). His laboratory at the Ragon Institute was focused on identifying protective immunity to HIV and Hepatitis C virus (HCV). He was a faculty member of the Harvard Virology PhD program and in 2013 was awarded the Massachusetts General Hospital Research Scholars Award, providing philanthropic support for his research program. Over the course of his career, he published over 180 peer-reviewed papers on HIV and HCV. His work used humanized mouse models to accelerate development and testing of novel immunotherapies for HIV, including most recently the design of a novel Dual CAR T cell capable of controlling HIV

== Death ==
In September 11, 2024, Allen died from a heart attack.

== Selected publications ==
- Allen, TM; O'Connor, DH; Jing, P; Dzuris, JL; Mothé, BR; Vogel, TU; Dunphy, E; Liebl, ME; Emerson, C; Wilson, N; Kunstman, KJ; Wang, X; Allison, DB; Hughes, AL; Desrosiers, RC; Altman, JD; Wolinsky, SM; Sette, A; Watkins, DI (2000). "Tat-specific cytotoxic T lymphocytes select for SIV escape variants during resolution of primary viraemia". Nature. 407 (6802): 386–90. Bibcode:2000Natur.407..386A. doi:10.1038/35030124. PMID 11014195.. According to Google Scholar, it has been cited 854 times.
- O'Connor, DH; Allen, TM; Vogel, TU; Jing, P; DeSouza, IP; Dodds, E; Dunphy, EJ; Melsaether, C; Mothé, B; Yamamoto, H; Horton, H; Wilson, N; Hughes, AL; Watkins, DI (2002). "Acute phase cytotoxic T lymphocyte escape is a hallmark of simian immunodeficiency virus infection". Nat Med. 8 (5): 493–9. doi:10.1038/nm0502-493. PMID 11984594.. . According to Google Scholar, it has been cited 435 times.
- Dudek, TE; No, DC; Seung, E; Vrbanac, VD; Fadda, L; Bhoumik, P; Boutwell, CL; Power, KA; Gladden, AD; Battis, L; Mellors, EF; Tivey, TR; Gao, X; Altfeld, M; Luster, AD; Tager, AM; Allen, TM (2012). "Rapid evolution of HIV-1 to functional CD8⁺ T cell responses in humanized BLT mice". Sci Transl Med. 4 (143): 143ra98. doi:10.1126/scitranslmed.3003984. PMC 3685142. PMID 22814851.
- Henn, MR; Boutwell, CL; Charlebois, P; Lennon, NJ; Power, KA; Macalalad, AR; Berlin, AM; Malboeuf, CM; Ryan, EM; Gnerre, S; Zody, MC; Erlich, RL; Green, LM; Berical, A; Wang, Y; Casali, M; Streeck, H; Bloom, AK; Dudek, T; Tully, D; Newman, R; Axten, KL; Gladden, AD; Battis, L; Kemper, M; Zeng, Q; Shea, TP; Gujja, S; Zedlack, C; Gasser, O; Brander, C; Hess, C; Günthard, HF; Brumme, ZL; Brumme, CJ; Bazner, S; Rychert, J; Tinsley, JP; Mayer, KH; Rosenberg, E; Pereyra, F; Levin, JZ; Young, SK; Jessen, H; Altfeld, M; Birren, BW; Walker, BD; Allen, TM (2012). "Whole genome deep sequencing of HIV-1 reveals the impact of early minor variants upon immune recognition during acute infection". PLOS Pathog. 8 (3) e1002529. doi:10.1371/journal.ppat.1002529. PMC 3297584. PMID 22412369.. According to Google Scholar, it has been cited 340 times.
- Maldini, CR; Claiborne, DT; Okawa, K; Chen, T; Dopkin, DL; Shan, X; Power, KA; Trifonova, RT; Krupp, K; Phelps, M; Vrbanac, VD; Tanno, S; Bateson, T; Leslie, GJ; Hoxie, JA; Boutwell, CL; Riley, JL; Allen, TM (2020). "Dual CD4-based CAR T cells with distinct costimulatory domains mitigate HIV pathogenesis in vivo". Nat Med. 26 (11): 1776–1787. doi:10.1038/s41591-020-1039-5. PMC 9422086. PMID 32868878.
