= Shu-ou Shan =

American biochemistry researcher

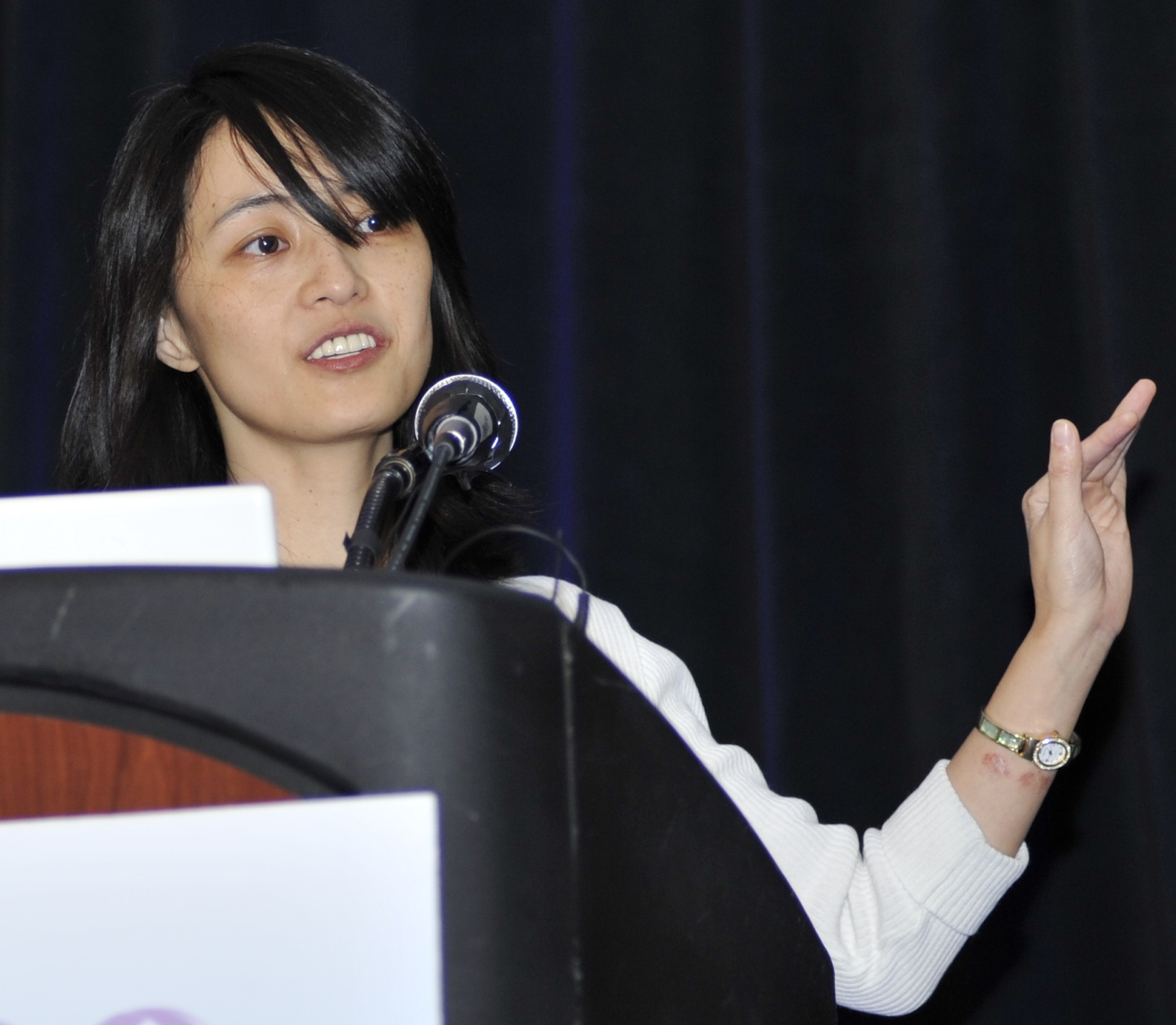
- Shan receiving American Society for Biochemistry and Molecular Biology Young Investigator award in 2013
- Born: Shanghai
- Education: Stanford University; University of Maryland, College Park
- Scientific career
- Workplaces: California Institute of Technology
- Thesis: Energetic analysis of hydrogen bonds in model systems : implications for enzymatic catalysis (1999)
- Doctoral advisor: Daniel Herschlag
- Other academic advisors: Peter Walter
- Website: Shan Lab

Shu-ou Shan is a Chinese American biologist who is a professor at the California Institute of Technology. Her research combines mechanistic enzymology with biophysical characterization techniques (e.g. Cryo em and fluorescence spectroscopy) to understand biogenesis pathways. She was awarded the 2024 National Academy of Sciences Award in Molecular Biology.

== Early life and education ==
Shan was born and raised in Shanghai. She moved to the United States after high school, and studied chemistry at the University of Maryland, College Park. She was a doctoral researcher at Stanford University, where she worked alongside Daniel Herschlag on RNA catalysis. She was first introduced to mechanistic enzymology there. She moved to University of California, San Francisco as a postdoctoral researcher, where she worked with Peter Walter on cell biology.

== Research and career ==
In 2005, Shan joined the faculty at California Institute of Technology. Her science is driven by questions about how cells control biological processes and the molecular principles that underpin biological recognition and mechanisms that define protein delivery.

Shan looks to understand the molecular mechanisms of co-translational protein machineries; including folding, assembly, targeting and biogenesis. Co-translational describes processes that occur at the same time as translation during protein synthesis. Using an array of biophysical characterization techniques, Shan looks to build a model that can predict what happens to nascent proteins as they emerge from the ribosome and their environment impacts these processes.

Shan studies molecular chaperones (proteins that assist in the folding or unfolding process) and how they protect proteins from mis-folding, sometimes even repairing mis-folding or aggregation.

== Awards and honors ==
- 2007 David and Lucile Packard Foundation Fellow
- 2007 Arnold and Mabel Beckman Fellow
- 2011 Protein Society Irving Sigal Young Investigator Award
- 2013 American Chemical Society Nobel Laureate Signature Award for Graduate Education in Chemistry
- 2013 American Society for Biochemistry and Molecular Biology Young Investigator Award
- 2020 Caltech Altair Professor of Chemistry
- 2024 National Academy of Sciences Award in Molecular Biology

== Selected publications ==
- David Akopian; Kuang Shen; Xin Zhang; Shu-ou Shan (13 February 2013). "Signal recognition particle: an essential protein-targeting machine". Annual Review of Biochemistry. 82: 693–721. doi:10.1146/annurev-biochem-072711-164732. ISSN 0066-4154. PMC 3805129. PMID 23414305. Wikidata Q38081948.
- S O Shan; S Loh; D Herschlag (1 April 1996). "The energetics of hydrogen bonds in model systems: implications for enzymatic catalysis". Science. 272 (5258): 97–101. Bibcode:1996Sci...272...97S. doi:10.1126/science.272.5258.97. ISSN 0036-8075. PMID 8600542. Wikidata Q70998826.
- Nathan W Pierce; Gary Kleiger; Shu-ou Shan; Raymond J Deshaies (1 December 2009). "Detection of sequential polyubiquitylation on a millisecond timescale". Nature. 462 (7273): 615–619. doi:10.1038/nature08595. ISSN 1476-4687. PMC 2791906. PMID 19956254. Wikidata Q42956366.
