= Hemann (disambiguation) =

Hemann might refer to:

- Hemann, a shouting ghost from German folklore
- Joseph A. Hemann (1816–1897), German-American educator, newspaper publisher and banker
- Joseph A. Hemann House, a house in Cincinnati, Ohio
- Michael Hemann (born 1971), an American cancer geneticist

== See also ==
- Heman (disambiguation)
- He-Man (disambiguation)
