= Alex K. Shalek =

Biomedical engineer

Alex Shalek
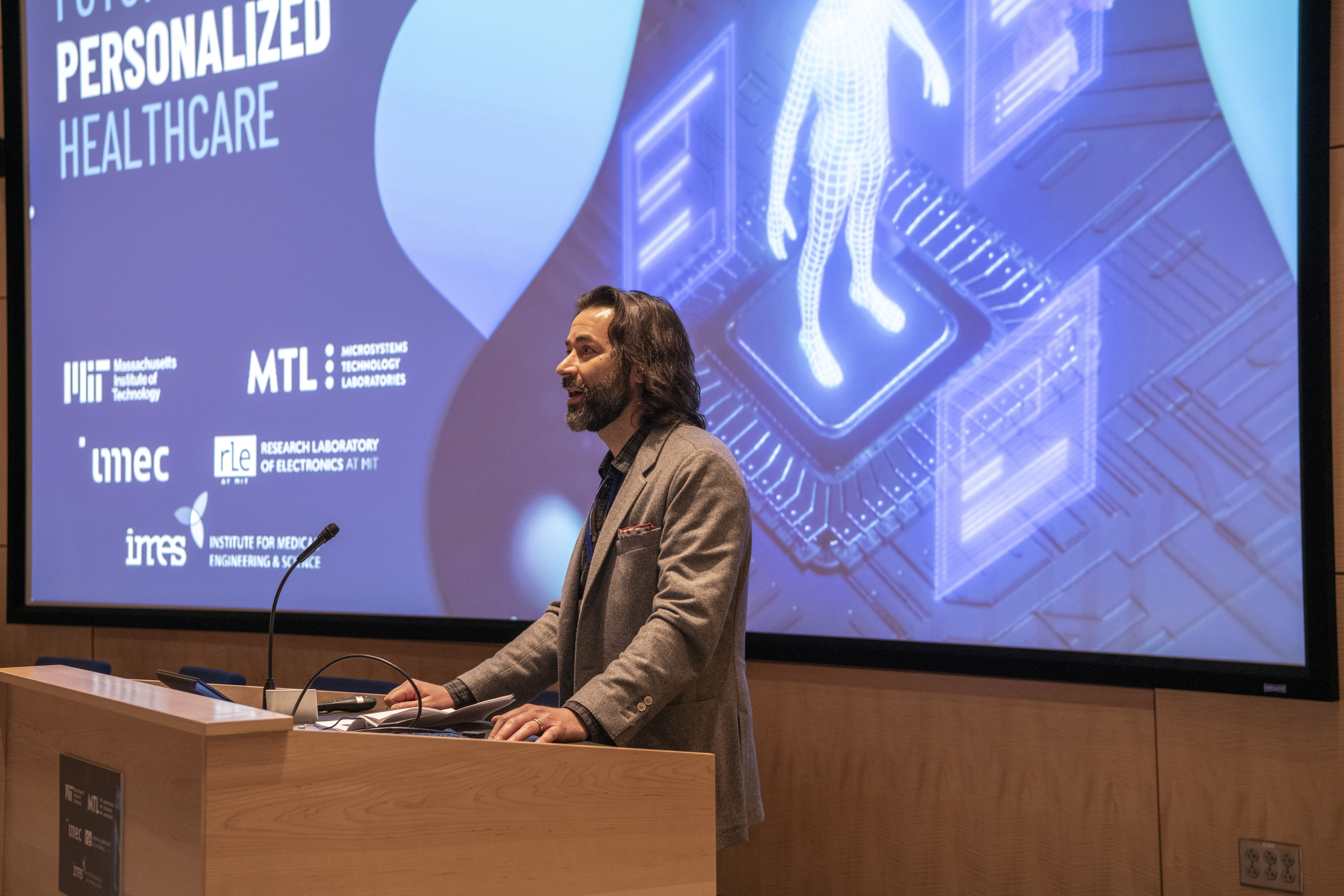
- Alex Shalek at the Health Sciences and Semiconductors Symposium in Cambridge, MA, November 2025.
- Education: Columbia University; Harvard University
- Awards: J. W. Kieckhefer Professorship (2023–present); E. Bright Wilson Prize Lecture, Harvard University (2026); Avant-Garde (DP1 Pioneer) Award, National Institute on Drug Abuse (2021); Harold E. Edgerton Faculty Achievement Award, MIT (2020); Pew-Stewart Scholar, Pew Charitable Trust (2018); Alfred P. Sloan Foundation Sloan Research Fellow (2018); Searle Scholars Program (2015); Beckman Young Investigators Award (2015); NIH Director's New Innovator Award (2015)
- Scientific career
- Workplaces: Massachusetts Institute of Technology; Broad Institute; Koch Institute for Integrative Cancer Research; Ragon Institute; Harvard Medical School
- Doctoral advisor: Hongkun Park
- Website: www.shaleklab.com

Alex K. Shalek is an American biomedical engineer. He is the director of the Institute for Medical Engineering and Science (IMES), the J. W. Kieckhefer Professor in IMES and the Department of Chemistry, and an extramural member of the Koch Institute for Integrative Cancer Research at the Massachusetts Institute of Technology (MIT). He also directs MIT's Health Innovation Hub, is a member of the Ragon Institute, an institute member of the Broad Institute, and an instructor in Health Sciences and Technology (HST) at Harvard Medical School.

Shalek and his laboratory are known for developing methods in single-cell and spatial genomics, and applying them to study cancer, and infectious and inflammatory diseases, often in partnership with clinical collaborators around the world.

== Education and early career ==
Shalek received his B.A. summa cum laude in 2004 from Columbia University, where he studied chemical physics as a John Jay Scholar with Richard Bersohn and Louis Brus. He then completed graduate work in chemical physics at Harvard University under Hongkun Park, developing arrays of nanowires as cellular “syringes” and electrochemical probes. As a postdoctoral fellow with Park and Aviv Regev at the Broad Institute, he helped pioneer the use of single-cell genomic measurements, showing that patterns in genome-wide gene expression across individual cells could be used to identify cell types and states, as well as their defining features.

== Research ==
Shalek's lab builds tools to comprehensively profile the attributes of individual cells and deploys them to human tissue samples, including small or difficult-to-collect clinical specimens. A widely adopted example is Seq-Well, a low-cost, portable device for single-cell RNA-sequencing designed to work in resource-limited settings. The lab has emphasized making such technologies broadly accessible, including through its participation in the Human Cell Atlas.

The lab has similarly developed screening platforms and strategies. Illustratively, they build a pipeline using intestinal organoids together with single-cell profiling to find molecules that could modulate gut crypt composition. They also developed a scalable screening method that applies many perturbations together in pooled form and then uses computation to separate out each one’s effects, making it possible to search far more efficiently for the environmental factors that can shape disease-relevant cell states. In 2026, they developed a perturb-seq inspired sequence-to-function screening platform to examine how LAT—a flexible, “intrinsically disordered” scaffolding protein—sets the relative strength of the signaling pathways that switch on when a T cell is activated, clarifying how immune cells calibrate the size and character of their responses. The lab also combined deep learning with gene-expression readouts to steer large drug screens toward compounds that produce a desired cellular change via active reinforcement learning.

Using these and related methods, the lab studies how cells in tissues respond to environmental stressors, and interact with pathogens (such as HIV, tuberculosis, and SARS-CoV-2) and cancerous cells. Examples include examining inflammatory and allergic conditions of barrier tissues such as the airway and gut, and the impact of chronic stresses—such as sustained changes in diet and metabolism—on these tissues.

In work on chronic inflammation and tissue biology, the lab showed that allergic inflammation can leave a lasting “memory” in the stem cells of the airway lining, built a cellular atlas of the colon in ulcerative colitis that identified fibroblast populations associated with resistance to anti-TNF therapy, discovered cellular changes underlying environmental enteropathy, a chronic intestinal condition common in low-resource settings, and described a population of sensory neurons that link the nervous system to lymph nodes. In 2026, the lab reported that, in response to a chronic high-fat diet, mature liver cells can revert to a more stem-cell-like state that helps them survive but, over time, makes them more susceptible to becoming cancerous. In infectious disease, the lab traced how immune cells are affected during Ebola infection and mapped the earliest immune changes during acute HIV-1 infection. During the COVID-19 pandemic, the lab helped identify the specific cell types targeted by SARS-CoV-2. In 2021, they took part in a large collaboration that built a single-cell atlas of tissues from people who had died of COVID-19, mapping in detail how SARS-CoV-2 damages the lungs and other organs. In related work, the lab found that the strength of the early antiviral response in the cells lining the nose may help determine how severe a case of COVID-19 becomes. In tuberculosis, meanwhile, they identified host features associated with control, how prior infection remodels the immune cells within the lungs to provide protection against reinfection, and showed that tobacco smoke draws inflammatory monocytes into the lung that may create conditions favorable to infection.

The lab has also studied therapeutic responses in cancers such as melanoma, pancreatic ductal adenocarcinoma, glioblastoma, and leukemia. In pancreatic cancer, for example, the lab showed that a tumor’s surrounding environment can shift cancer cells between different states and change how they respond to drugs, pointing to new ways to guide treatment.

== Leadership ==
In August 2024, Shalek became director of MIT's Institute for Medical Engineering and Science (IMES), succeeding Elazer R. Edelman, who had led the institute since 2018. He also directs MIT's Health Innovation Hub.

== Selected honors and awards ==
- E. Bright Wilson Prize Lecture, Harvard University, 2026
- J. W. Kieckhefer Professorship, MIT, 2023–present
- Avant-Garde (DP1 Pioneer) Award, National Institute on Drug Abuse (NIDA), 2021
- Harold E. Edgerton Faculty Achievement Award, MIT, 2020
- Young Mentor Award, Harvard Medical School, 2020
- Pew-Stewart Scholar, Pew Charitable Trusts, 2018–2022
- Sloan Research Fellow in Chemistry, Alfred P. Sloan Foundation, 2018–2020
- Pfizer-Laubach Career Development Professorship, MIT, 2017–2020
- NIH Director's New Innovator Award, 2015–2020
- Beckman Young Investigator Award, Arnold and Mabel Beckman Foundation, 2015–2019
- Searle Scholar, Searle Scholars Program, 2015
- NSF Graduate Research Fellowship, 2005–2008

== Selected publications ==
- Tzouanas, C. N. et al. (2026). “Hepatic adaptation to chronic metabolic stress primes tumorigenesis.” Cell 189 (2): 435–460.
- Rubin, A. J. et al. (2026). “Disordered protein LAT encodes relative levels of signaling pathways in T cell activation.” Science 392 (6797): eads6847.
- DeMeo, B. et al. (2025). “Active learning framework leveraging transcriptomics identifies modulators of disease phenotypes.” Science.
- Liu, N. et al. (2024). “Scalable, compressed phenotypic screening using pooled perturbations.” Nature Biotechnology.
- Bromley, J. D. et al. (2024). “CD4+ T cells re-wire granuloma cellularity and regulatory networks to promote immunomodulation following Mtb reinfection.” Immunity 57 (10): 2380–2398.
- Corleis, B. et al. (2023). “Tobacco smoke exposure recruits inflammatory airspace monocytes that establish permissive lung niches for Mycobacterium tuberculosis.” Science Translational Medicine 15 (725): eadg3451.
- Mead, B. E. et al. (2022). “Screening for modulators of the cellular composition of gut epithelia via organoid models of intestinal stem cell differentiation.” Nature Biomedical Engineering 6: 280–294.
- Kummerlowe, C. et al. (2022). “Single-cell profiling of environmental enteropathy reveals signatures of epithelial remodeling and immune activation.” Science Translational Medicine 14: eabi8633.
- Raghavan, S. et al. (2021). “Microenvironment drives cell state, plasticity, and drug response in pancreatic cancer.” Cell 184: 6119–6137.
- Ziegler, C. G. K. et al. (2020). “SARS-CoV-2 receptor ACE2 is an interferon-stimulated gene in human airway epithelial cells and is detected in specific cell subsets across tissues.” Cell 181: 1016–1035.
- Ordovas-Montanes, J. et al. (2018). “Allergic inflammatory memory in human respiratory epithelial progenitor cells.” Nature 560: 649–654.
- Gierahn, T. M. et al. (2017). “Seq-Well: portable, low-cost RNA sequencing of single cells at high throughput.” Nature Methods 14: 395–398.
- Macosko, E. Z. et al. (2015). “Highly parallel genome-wide expression profiling of individual cells using nanoliter droplets.” Cell 161: 1202–1214.
- Shalek, A. K. et al. (2014). “Single-cell RNA-seq reveals dynamic paracrine control of cellular variation.” Nature 510: 363–369.
- Shalek, A. K. et al. (2013). “Single-cell transcriptomics reveals bimodality in expression and splicing in immune cells.” Nature 498: 236–240.
