= Nathalie de Leon =

American physicist (born 1982)

Nathalie Pulmones de Leon
- Born: 1982 (age 43–44); Makati, Philippines
- Education: Stanford University; Harvard University
- Scientific career
- Workplaces: Princeton University
- Thesis: [ProQuest 877967609 Engineering confined Electrons and Photons at the Nanoscale] (2011)
- Doctoral advisor: Hongkun Park
- Other academic advisors: Richard Zare; Mikhail Lukin

Nathalie Pulmones de Leon (born 1982) is a Filipino-American chemist, physicist, and associate professor in the department of electrical and computer engineering at Princeton University. Her research focuses on building quantum technologies with solid state defects and the identification of novel materials systems for superconducting qubits. She was awarded the 2023 American Physical Society Rolf Landauer and Charles H. Bennett Award in Quantum Computing.

== Early life and education ==
Nathalie de Leon was born in Makati, the Philippines, in 1982 and raised in California. Her parents were also born in the Philippines. Her maternal grandfather was a commercial seaman who was stationed in San Francisco during the attack on Pearl Harbor, and was subsequently offered U.S. citizenship contingent on joining the United States Coast Guard. de Leon spent part of her childhood in the Philippines but completed high school in the United States.

De Leon was an undergraduate student at Stanford University in Palo Alto, California. She completed her undergraduate research in the laboratory of Richard Zare, where she worked on laser spectroscopy. She performed laser-based mass spectrometry on meteoritic samples to explore chemical reactions in space. de Leon moved to Harvard University for her doctoral research in chemical physics, where she joined the laboratory of Hongkun Park.

Her research looked to achieve nanoscale confinement of electrons and photons. She developed a nanoscale plasmon resonator capable of tailoring specific light–matter interactions, and demonstrated it convert a broadband emitter to a narrow-band single-photon source. de Leon remained at Harvard University as a postdoctoral researcher, working with Mikhail Lukin.

== Awards and honors ==
- 2016; Air Force Office for Scientific Research Young Investigator Award
- 2017; Sloan Research Fellowship
- 2018: National Science Foundation CAREER Award
- 2018: Department of Energy Early Career Award
- 2023: Rolf Landauer and Charles H. Bennett Award in Quantum Computing

== Select publications ==
- Brendon C Rose; Ding Huang; Zi-Huai Zhang; et al. (July 1, 2018). "Observation of an environmentally insensitive solid-state spin defect in diamond". Science. 361 (6397): 60–63. arXiv:1706.01555. doi:10.1126/science.aao0290. ISSN 0036-8075. PMID 29976820. Wikidata Q89434052.
- Nathalie P de Leon; Brendan J Shields; Chun L Yu; Dirk E Englund; Alexey V Akimov; Mikhail D Lukin; Hongkun Park (May 31, 2012). "Tailoring light-matter interaction with a nanoscale plasmon resonator". Physical Review Letters. 108 (22) 226803. doi:10.1103/physrevlett.108.226803. ISSN 0031-9007. PMID 23003638. Wikidata Q53360076.
- B J Shields; Q P Unterreithmeier; N P de Leon; H Park; M D Lukin (March 31, 2015). "Efficient readout of a single spin state in diamond via spin-to-charge conversion". Physical Review Letters. 114 (13) 136402. arXiv:1410.0370. doi:10.1103/physrevlett.114.136402. ISSN 0031-9007. PMID 25884129. Wikidata Q53223650.

== Personal life ==
de Leon is married, and met her husband while she was completing her postdoc appointment at Harvard and he was finishing his PhD.
