= Koch Institute for Integrative Cancer Research =

MIT cancer research center

Coordinates: 42°21′44″N 71°5′19″W

Koch Institute for Integrative Cancer Research at MIT

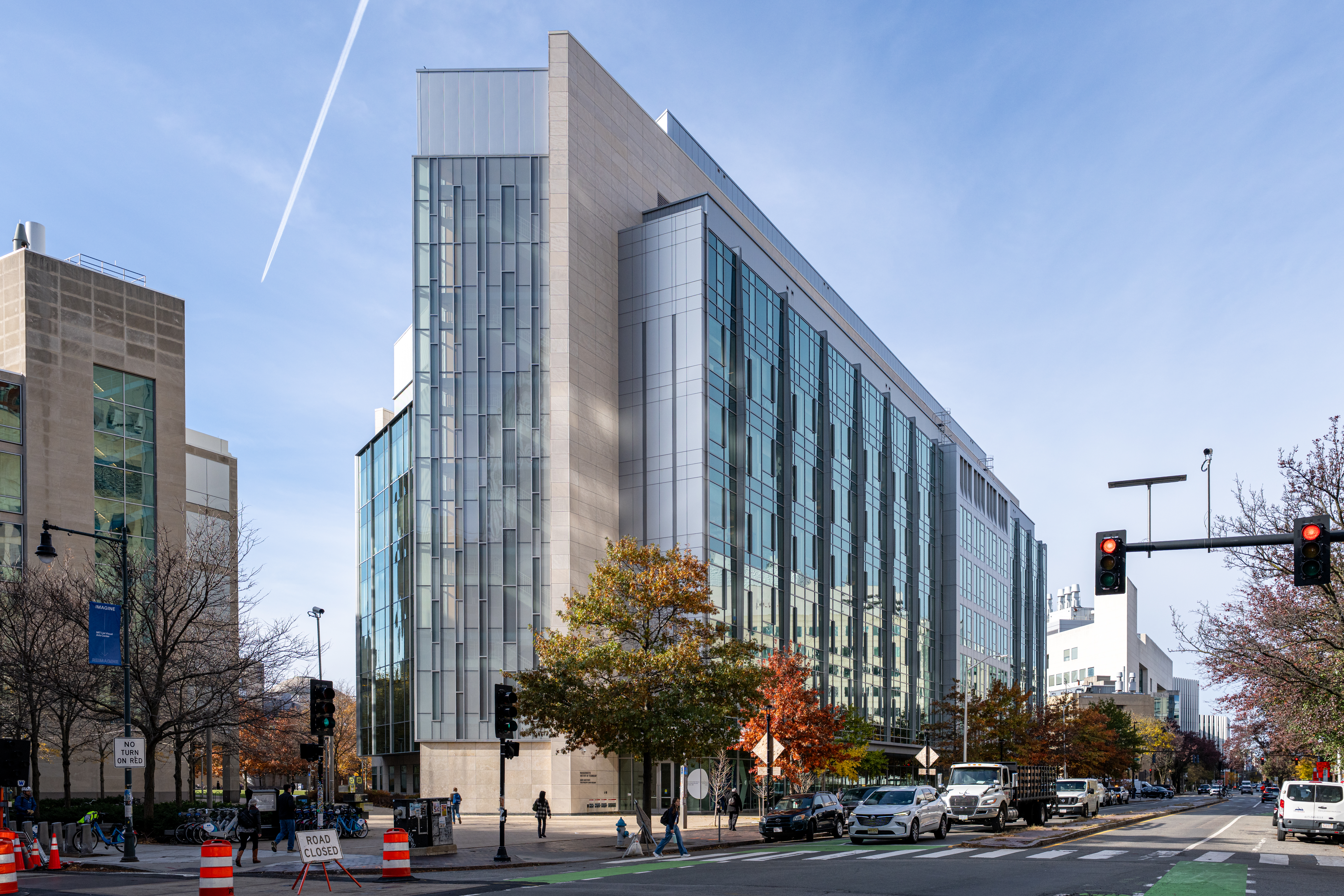
- The David H. Koch Institute for Integrative Cancer Research at MIT (Building 76)
- Established: October 9, 2007
- Research type: Basic (non-clinical) research
- Budget: $93.2 million
- Field of research: Cancer research
- Director: Matthew Vander Heiden
- Faculty: 29
- Staff: 500
- Location: 77 Massachusetts Ave. Building 76, Cambridge, Massachusetts
- Campus: 180,000 square feet (17,000 m^{2})
- Affiliations: National Cancer Institute
- Operating agency: Massachusetts Institute of Technology
- Website: ki.mit.edu

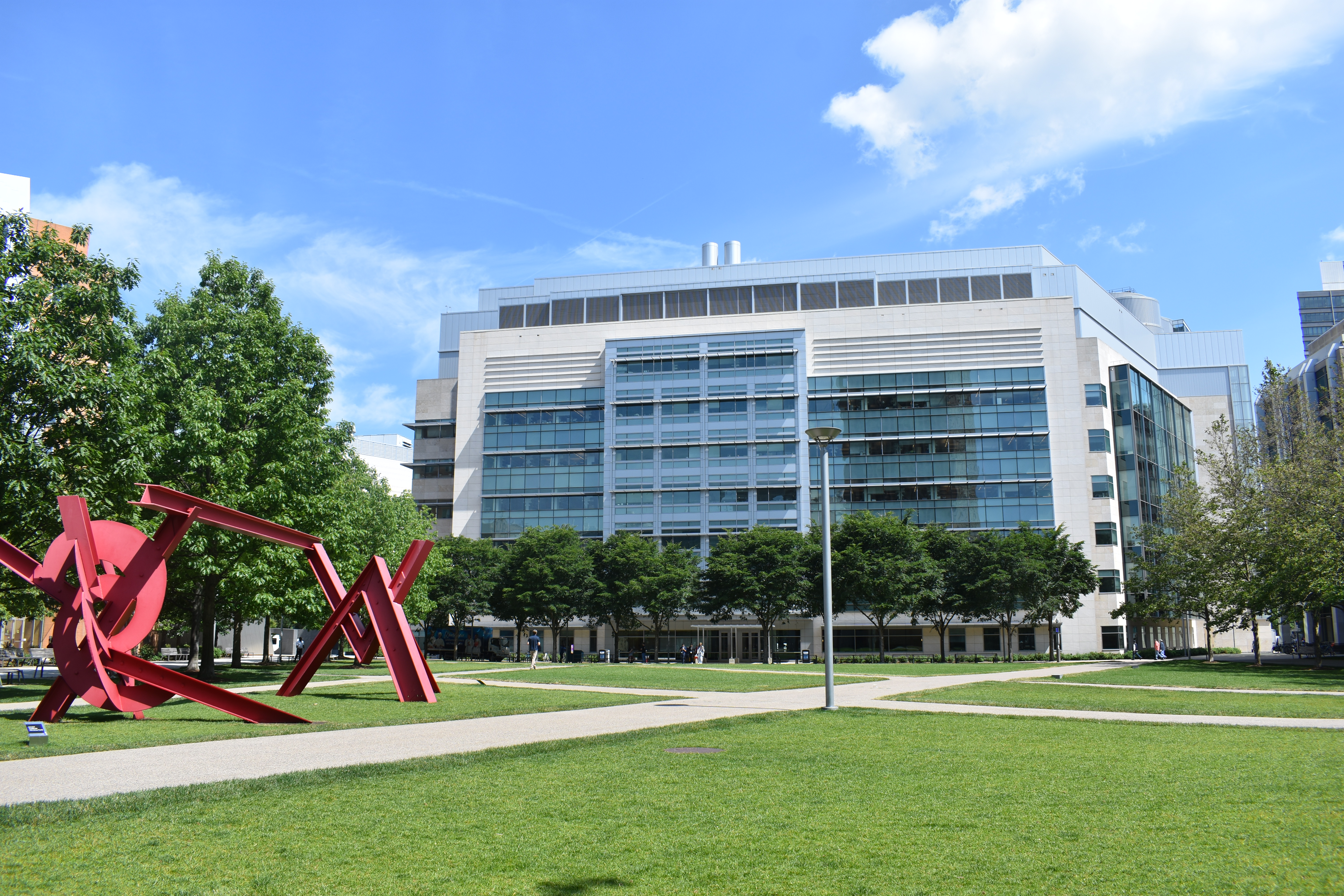
Koch Institute for Integrative Cancer Research

The Koch Institute for Integrative Cancer Research at MIT (/koʊk/ KOHK; also referred to as the Koch Institute or KI) is a cancer research center affiliated with the Massachusetts Institute of Technology (MIT) located in Cambridge, Massachusetts, United States. The institute is one of seven National Cancer Institute-designated basic laboratory cancer centers in the United States.

The institute was launched in October 2007 with a $100 million grant from David H. Koch and the 180,000 square feet (17,000 m^{2}) research facility opened in December 2010, replacing the MIT Center for Cancer Research (CCR). The institute is affiliated with 29 MIT faculty members in both the Schools of Engineering and Science.

== History ==
In 1974, the Center for Cancer Research was founded by 1969 Nobel laureate Salvador Luria to study basic biological processes related to cancer. The center researches the genetic and molecular basis of cancer, how alterations in cellular processes affect cell growth and behavior, and how the immune system develops and recognizes antigens. The CCR was both a physical research center as well as an organizing body for the larger MIT cancer research community of over 500 researchers. Financial support for the CCR primarily came from Center Core grant from the National Cancer Institute as well as research project grants from the National Institutes of Health, Howard Hughes Medical Institute, and foundation support. The CCR research groups were successful in identifying oncogenes, immunology of T lymphocytes, and roles of various cellular proteins. The CCR produced four Nobel Laureates: David Baltimore (1975), Susumu Tonegawa (1987), Phillip Sharp (1993), and H. Robert Horvitz (2002).

In 2006, President Susan Hockfield announced plans for a new CCR center to support and expand cancer research performed by biologists and engineers. A $20 million grant was made by the Ludwig Fund, part of Ludwig Cancer Research, in November 2007 to support a Center for Molecular Oncology to be administered by the CCR. In 2007, MIT announced it had received a $100 million gift from David H. Koch, the executive vice president of the oil conglomerate Koch Industries. Koch graduated from MIT with bachelor's and master's degrees in chemical engineering and served on the university's board of directors since 1988. Koch survived a prostate cancer diagnosis in 1992, previously donated $25 million over ten years to MIT to support cancer research, and is the namesake of the university's Koch Biology Building. The gift supported the construction of the estimated $240–$280 million facility, on the condition that MIT build the center even if fund raising fell short.

== Mission ==
The Koch Institute emphasizes basic research into how cancer is caused, progresses, and responds to treatment. Unlike many other NCI Cancer Centers, it will not provide medical care or conduct clinical research, but it partners with oncology centers such as the Dana-Farber Cancer Institute and Massachusetts General Hospital's Cancer Center. The institute combines the existing faculty of the CCR with an equivalent number of engineering faculty to promote interdisciplinary approaches to diagnosing, monitoring, and treating cancer.

The Koch Institute has identified five areas of research that it believes are critical for controlling cancer: Developing nanotechnology-based cancer therapeutics, creating novel devices for cancer detection and monitoring, exploring the molecular and cellular basis of metastasis, advancing personalized medicine through analysis of cancer pathways and drug resistance, engineering the immune system to fight cancer.

== Affiliates ==
The Koch Institute is home to faculty members from various departments, including Biology, Chemistry, Mechanical Engineering, and Biological Engineering; more than 40 laboratories and 500 researchers across the campus. Koch Institute faculty teach classes at MIT, as well as train graduate and undergraduate students as well as postdoctoral fellows. The Koch Institute is affiliated with two current Nobel Laureates (Horvitz and Sharp), eighteen members of the National Academy of Sciences, eight members of the National Academy of Engineering, five National Medal of Science laureates, and ten Howard Hughes Medical Institute investigators, and one MacArthur Foundation Fellowship recipient.

Notable faculty members affiliated with the Koch Institute include:

- Angela M. Belcher
- Sangeeta N. Bhatia
- Paula T. Hammond
- Michael Hemann
- Nancy Hopkins
- Richard O. Hynes
- Tyler Jacks
- Robert S. Langer
- Phillip Sharp
- Michael B. Yaffe

== Building ==
The 180,000 square feet (17,000 m^{2}) research facility is located on the corner of Main Street and Ames Street near Kendall Square in Cambridge, Massachusetts. The building is located opposite the Whitehead Institute and Broad Institute and near the biology and chemical engineering buildings on the north-eastern end of MIT's campus. MIT broke ground on Building 76 in March 2008, a topping-off ceremony was held in February 2009, and the building was dedicated on March 4, 2011.

The building was designed by Cambridge-based architecture firm Ellenzweig, which designed several other buildings on the MIT campus. The structural engineer was LeMessurier. Designed to encourage interaction and collaboration, the building employs both dedicated lab space as well as common areas, and features a ground-floor gallery exhibiting art and technical displays related to biomedical research. The building includes facilities for bioinformatics and computing, genomics, proteomics and flow cytometry, large-scale cell and animal facilities for genetic engineering and testing, advanced imaging equipment, and nanomaterials characterization labs.

== Activity since 2007 ==
The KI remains funded by a NCI center grant as well as 110 fully funded projects. Research volume in 2017–2018 totaled $93.2 million. As of 2009, notable grants include Mouse Models of Cancer Consortium, Integrative Cancer Biology Program, and the Centers for Excellence in Nanotechnology and Cancer.

In 2011, scientists at the institute pinpointed a genetic change that makes lung cancer more likely to spread around the body and may help scientists develop new drugs to fight secondary tumors.

In 2020, Alex K. Shalek, Christopher Love, Travis Hughes and Marc Wadsworth developed an updated protocol for the commonly used low-input RNA sequencing method Seq-Well, increasing output resolution by ten times.
