= He-Man (disambiguation) =

He-Man is a character from the Masters of the Universe media franchise.

He-Man may also refer to:

== Animation ==
- He-Man and the Masters of the Universe, 1983–1985 animated series
- He-Man & She-Ra: A Christmas Special, 1985 animation special
- The New Adventures of He-Man, 1990 animated series
- He-Man and the Masters of the Universe (2002 TV series), revival of the 1980s animated series
- He-Man and the Masters of the Universe (2021 TV series), revival of the 1980s animated series

== Video games ==
- He-Man: Power of Grayskull, 2003 role-playing video game for the Game Boy Advance
- He-Man: Defender of Grayskull, 2005 multi-platform action-adventure game

== Films ==
- Masters of the Universe (1987 film), American live-action film starring Dolph Lundgren as He-Man
- Masters of the Universe (2026 film), American live-action film starring Nicholas Galitzine as He-Man
- He-Man (film), 2011 Chinese film, unrelated to the comic character

== See also ==
- He (disambiguation)
- Man (disambiguation)
- Heman (disambiguation)
- Hemann (disambiguation)
- Masters of the Universe (disambiguation)
- Machismo
- She-Man (film)
