= Master of the Universe =

Master of the Universe may refer to:

- "Master of the Universe", a song by the British band Pulp from their album Freaks (1987)
- "Master of the Universe", a song by Hawkwind from the album In Search of Space (1971)
- "Master of the Universe", a song by Sick Puppies from the album Tri-Polar (2009)
- "Master of the Universe", a song by John Lipari from the album Past, Present & Future (2019)
- Stephen Hawking: Master of the Universe, a documentary series about theoretical physicist and cosmologist Stephen Hawking (2008)
- Master of the Universe, a fanfiction by E. L. James that was reworked into Fifty Shades of Grey (2011)
- "Master of the Universe", high-flyers on Wall Street, a usage found in the Tom Wolfe novel The Bonfire of the Vanities and its film adaptation (1987)
- Aidan Walsh: Master of the Universe, 2000 Irish documentary

== See also ==
- Masters of the Universe (disambiguation)
