= Junqiao Wu =

American material scientist

Junqiao Wu is the UMC Distinguished Professor and Department Chair of materials science at the University of California, Berkeley. Wu's materials science research focuses on semiconductors, electronic materials and thermal energy transport. Wu's research in semiconductors has led to major discoveries in the field, such as indium gallium nitride alloys have bandgaps spanning the entire near infrared to ultraviolet spectrum, the band anticrossing model to describe band structure of highly mismatched semiconductor alloys, electrons in vanadium dioxide conduct energy without conducting heat, a temperature adaptive radiative coating that automatically switches thermal emissivity, as well as a range of applications and innovations in solar cells, LEDs, electrochromic and thermochromic coatings, infrared imaging, photonics, and thermal management. He received a BS degree from Fudan University, a MS degree from Peking University, and a PhD degree under Prof. Eugene Haller from UC Berkeley. He received postdoctoral training under Prof. Hongkun Park from Harvard University. His honors include the Berkeley Fellowship, the 29th Ross N. Tucker Memorial Award, the U.C. Regents' Junior Faculty Fellowship, the Berkeley Presidential Chair Fellowship, the US-NSF Career Award, the US-DOE Early Career Award, the Presidential Early Career Award for Scientists and Engineers (PECASE) from the White House, the Outstanding Alumni Award from Peking University China, the Bakar Faculty Fellows Award, elected Fellow from the American Physical Society (APS) and the 2023 John Bardeen Award from the Minerals, Metals and Materials Society (TMS). He is currently on the Chair Line of the Division of Materials Physics at the American Physical Society (APS), and holds joint appointment at the Lawrence Berkeley National Laboratory. He is also a co-founder of Aetara, a space company developing advanced thermal infrastructure based on the Space Temperature Adaptive Radiative Coating (STARC) technology pioneered by the Wu group.

== Awards and honors ==
- Ross N. Tucker Award, 2003
- Presidential Early Career Awards for Scientists and Engineers, 2013
- Fellow of American Physical Society (APS), 2018
- John Bardeen Award from the Minerals, Metals and Materials Society (TMS), 2023
