= Rhiju Das =

American biochemist (born 1978)

- Born: Houston, Texas
- Education: Oklahoma School of Science and Mathematics; Harvard University; Trinity College, Cambridge; University College London; Stanford University
- Known for: EteRNA
- Awards: OpenEye/American Chemical Society Outstanding Junior Faculty (2015); W. M. Keck Foundation Medical Research Grant (2012); Burroughs Wellcome Career Award (2008); Jane Coffin Childs Foundation, Damon Runyon Fellowships (2006); Gold medal, International Physics Olympiad; (1995)
- Scientific career
- Fields: computational biologist; molecular biophysics; crowdsourcing
- Workplaces: Stanford University
- Doctoral advisor: Sebastian Doniach; Daniel Herschlag
- Other academic advisors: David Baker
- Website: daslab.stanford.edu

Rhiju Das (born 1978 in Houston, Texas) is a computational biochemist and a professor of biochemistry and physics at Stanford University. Research in his lab seeks a predictive understanding of how RNA molecules and their complexes form molecular machines fundamental to life.

== Education ==
Das was trained as a physicist before switching to biochemistry. His undergraduate education was at Harvard, in physics, followed by master's research as a Marshall scholar at Cambridge University and University College London in experimental cosmology and molecular phylogenetics. He completed his Ph.D. in physics at Stanford University, supervised by Sebastian Doniach and Daniel Herschlag.

== Career ==
Das was a Jane Coffin Childs postdoctoral fellow working on protein structure prediction with David Baker at the University of Washington. He joined Stanford's biochemistry department in 2009 and was promoted with tenure in 2016. He was selected to be a Howard Hughes investigator in 2021, and co-founded the RNA design startup Inceptive that same year.

== Research ==
Das develops methods to simulate and computationally design RNA molecules as well as experimental methods to infer RNA structure from multidimensional chemical mapping measurements. Integrating these efforts, Das directs the Eterna massive open laboratory, which integrates an internet-scale videogame with massively parallel experiments and machine learning. The project aims to empower citizen scientists to invent medicine.

In 2020, Das and his staff used the Eterna platform to investigate potentially shelf-stable RNA vaccines for COVID-19. An interview with Das about this work was featured in an episode of Nova, "Decoding COVID-19", in May 2020.

Das also is known for his work on demonstrating the application of cryo-electron microscopy to accelerate the structure determination of RNA. He helped launch and served as an assessor for the first RNA category in the Critical Assessment of Structure Prediction in 2022.
