= Dan Barouch =

American physician, immunologist, and virologist

- Born: February 4, 1973 (age 53); Gottingen, West Germany
- Citizenship: American
- Education: Harvard University (B.A., M.D.); Oxford University (Ph.D.)
- Known for: Virology and immunology of pathogens of global importance, Vaccine development for HIV, Zika, COVID-19, influenza, tuberculosis
- Spouse(s): Fina C. Barouch, M.D.
- Awards: National Academy of Medicine (2020) King Faisel Prize in Medicine (2023)
- Scientific career
- Fields: Virology
- Workplaces: Beth Israel Deaconess Medical Center,Harvard Medical School, Ragon Institute, MIT, and Harvard

Dan Hung Barouch (born February 4, 1973) is an American physician, immunologist and virologist, who studies the pathogenesis and immunology of viral infections and works on the development of global vaccine strategies.

He authored multiple research and review articles on infectious diseases, viral pathogenesis, immune responses, and vaccine development. Research from Barouch's lab was used in the development of the Johnson & Johnson COVID-19 vaccine. He also worked on vaccine candidates for HIV, Zika, influenza, tuberculosis, and monkeypox.

== Early life and education ==
Barouch was born in Göttingen, West Germany to an Israeli Jewish father and a Chinese mother, and raised in Potsdam, New York. He enrolled at Harvard College at 16, earning a B.A. in biochemistry summa cum laude in 1993, and a Ph.D. in immunology from Oxford as a Marshall Scholar in 1995. He received his M.D. summa cum laude from Harvard Medical School in 1999, followed by residency and fellowship training at Massachusetts General Hospital and Brigham and Women's Hospital. In 2002, he launched his research lab at Beth Israel Deaconess Medical Center and Harvard Medical School.

== Research and career ==
In 2012, Barouch was named the founding director of the Center for Virology and Vaccine Research at Beth Israel Deaconess Medical Center in Boston. He was appointed the William Bosworth Castle Professor of Medicine at Harvard Medical School in 2020. He is also a founding member and a steering committee member at the Ragon Institute of Massachusetts General Hospital, Massachusetts Institute of Technology, and Harvard University. He is also affiliated with the Bill & Melinda Gates Foundation Collaboration for AIDS Vaccine Discovery.

== HIV research ==
Barouch began developing vaccine candidates for HIV and other infectious diseases during graduate and medical school, focusing on adjuvanted DNA vaccines and novel adenoviral vectors, including Ad26.

In 2000, during medical school, he began researching HIV vaccines and demonstrated that vaccines could reduce viral loads in preclinical models, although immune escape remained a significant challenge. In 2002, he published that an HIV vaccine could suppress the virus for two years in lab animals. By 2006, he had developed adenoviral vectors that avoided suppression by existing immunity. Barouch's lab developed adenoviral vectors and mosaic proteins (with Bette Korber) that were later incorporated into Johnson & Johnson's HIV vaccine studies.

From 2015 to 2018, Barouch co-led the APPROACH study of the Ad26/Env mosaic vaccine in humans and progressed to global efficacy trials in collaboration with partners such as the NIH, the Gates Foundation, and Janssen.

He also explored HIV cure strategies, demonstrating in 2016 and 2018 that combining therapeutic vaccines or broadly neutralizing antibodies with immune activators, also known as the "shock and kill" method, had the potential to be effective.

== Zika research ==
In 2016, Barouch developed and tested the first Zika vaccines in preclinical studies. These vaccines entered first-in-human trials later that year.

== COVID-19 research ==
In January 2020, at the start of the COVID-19 pandemic, Barouch began studying the immunology and pathogenesis of SARS-CoV-2 infection in collaboration with Johnson & Johnson and developing a COVID-19 vaccine. It underwent rapid preclinical testing and advanced into initial clinical trials by July 2020, after which tested in a large international phase three efficacy trial. The resulting vaccine, known as the Johnson & Johnson COVID-19 vaccine, or Ad26.COV2.S, was approved by WHO and commenced global distribution in February 2021. This vaccine was the third COVID-19 vaccine authorized for use in the United States, and the first vaccine deployed in South Africa. Its utilization was lower than mRNA vaccines in the western world, but deployed extensively in developing countries, given its efficacy, durability, and stability without freezing. With over 200 million doses distributed, it has been credited with saving nearly one million lives in 2021.

Barouch's research also involved studying the immunology of SARS-CoV-2 infection, the immunogenicity and durability of mRNA vaccines and boosters, and the impact of SARS-CoV-2 variants on immune escape and vaccine efficacy. He also defined immune correlates of protection for COVID-19 vaccines. In February 2021, Barouch co-authored a paper on how a certain level of COVID-19 antibodies may provide lasting protection against the virus. In 2021 and 2022 he also co-authored papers exploring the protective mechanisms by COVID-19 antibodies, based on blood samples provided by 4300 employees of SpaceX.

Throughout the rollout of COVID-19 vaccines and boosters in the United States, Barouch reported the immune kinetics and durability induced by mRNA and Ad26 vaccines and the impact of viral variants in evading antibody responses while preserving T cell responses. In 2022, he reported that the bivalent ancestral+BA.5 mRNA boosters were limited by immune imprinting to the ancestral strain, which contributed to the FDA decision in 2023 to remove the ancestral strain for the XBB.1.5 mRNA booster. In 2023, Barouch served as part of a panel of experts advising the Biden administration on the potential risk of another Omicron-like wave of COVID. In 2024, he demonstrated the importance of mucosal immunity for improving vaccine protection against COVID-19.

== Mpox ==
In 2023, Barouch reported that mpox infection was associated with upregulation of innate and inflammatory immune pathways and downregulation of pathways related to collagen formation and extracellular matrix organization. In 2024, he reported that two antigens were sufficient for vaccine protection against mpox in preclinical studies, and that antibodies targeting M1R and B6R correlated with protection. He also reported that the Jynneos vaccine induced antibody responses in humans with limited durability.

== Influenza and tuberculosis ==
In 2025, Barouch reported on the role of mucosal immunity in improving vaccine protection against seasonal and pandemic influenza. In 2026, he reported that the H3N2 K variant partially evaded baseline and vaccine-induced immunity. In 2025, he also reported the identification of new protective antigens for a tuberculosis vaccine.

== Media appearances ==
Barouch was featured in the PBS Nova documentary Decoding COVID-19 (2020).

He also appeared in the HBO documentary How to Survive a Pandemic (2022), directed by David France.

He was also featured in the book A Shot to Save the World (2021) by Gregory Zuckerman.

== Personal life ==
Barouch is married to Fina C. Barouch, an ophthalmologist. They have two daughters and reside in Newton, Massachusetts.

== Societies and awards ==
1993:

- All-USA Academic Team by USA Today.

1999:

- Graduated with M.D. summa cum laude from Harvard Medical School.

2009:

- Elected to the American Society for Clinical Investigation.

2012:

- Awarded the Oswald Avery Award by the Infectious Diseases Society of America.

2016:

- Named honorary researcher at the Centre de Recherche in the University of Montreal Health Centre (Centre hospitalier de l'Université de Montréal, CHUM)
- Named Bostonian of the Year by the Boston Globe Magazine.

2020:

- Elected to the National Academy of Medicine

2021:

- Awarded the George Ledlie Prize for his work towards the creation of the SARS-CoV-2 vaccine.
- Awarded the Bostonians of the Year Award by The Boston Globe.

2023:

- Jointly awarded the 2023 King Faisal Prize for Medicine with vaccinologist Sarah Gilbert.

2025:

- Elected to the Council of the American Society for Clinical Investigation.
