= Heman =

Heman may refer to

- Heman the Ezrahite, the author of Psalm 88 in the Hebrew Bible
- Heman (given name), a male given name
- Heman, Illinois, an unincorporated community

== See also ==
- He-Man (disambiguation)
- Hemann (disambiguation)
