= Institute for Medical Engineering and Science =

Institute at the Massachusetts Institute of Technology

- Established: 2012
- Affiliations: MIT
- Location: Cambridge, Massachusetts, United States; 42°21′42″N 71°05′12″W
- Website: imes.mit.edu

The Institute for Medical Engineering and Science (IMES) is a research institute at the Massachusetts Institute of Technology that aims to combine engineering, medicine, and science to solve challenges in human health. The institute was established in 2012 and is currently directed by Alex K. Shalek. Thomas Heldt is the associate director and some core faculty members include Elazer Edelman, Emery Brown, and Ellen Roche.

IMES serves to bring together scientific advances with clinical medicine by serving as the point of intersection with major hospitals and industry partners. IMES is also the MIT home for the Harvard–MIT Program in Health Sciences and Technology.
