= Hongkun Park =

South Korean-born American chemist and physicist

- 박홍근
- Born: 1967 (age 58–59); Seoul, South Korea
- Education: Seoul National University (B.S., 1990); Stanford University (Ph.D., 1996); University of California, Berkeley (Postdoc, 1996–1999)
- Known for: Nanoscience, quantum information science, quantum materials, bio–nano interfaces
- Awards: Ho-Am Prize in Science (2003); Packard Fellowship (2001); NIH Director's Pioneer Award (2008); Vannevar Bush Faculty Fellowship (2016); Member of the American Academy of Arts and Sciences (2025)
- Scientific career
- Fields: Chemistry, Physics
- Workplaces: Harvard University; Broad Institute; Samsung Electronics
- Doctoral advisor: Richard N. Zare
- Other academic advisors: Paul Alivisatos; Paul McEuen
- Doctoral students: Alex K. Shalek; Nathalie de Leon
- Other notable students: Junqiao Wu; Dirk Englund
- Website: hongkunparklab.com

Hongkun Park (born 1967; Korean: 박홍근) is a South Korean-born American chemist and physicist. He was appointed Corporate President of Samsung Electronics in January 2026 and serves as Head of the Samsung Advanced Institute of Technology (SAIT).

He is also the Mark Hyman Jr. Professor of Chemistry and a Professor of Physics at Harvard University (on leave). Park is renowned for his contributions to nanoscience, quantum information science, quantum materials, and bio–nano interfaces.

== Early life and education ==
Park received a B.S. in chemistry from Seoul National University in 1990, graduating summa cum laude and as valedictorian. After completing his mandatory military service in the South Korean Army, he earned a Ph.D. in chemistry at Stanford University in 1996 under Richard N. Zare, then conducted postdoctoral research at the University of California, Berkeley and Lawrence Berkeley National Laboratory with A. Paul Alivisatos and Paul L. McEuen.

== Career ==
Park joined the Harvard faculty in 1999 as an assistant professor. He became John L. Loeb Associate Professor of the Natural Sciences in 2003 and was promoted to Full Professor in 2004. He holds joint appointments in Chemistry and Physics and is affiliated with the Harvard Quantum Science and Engineering Program, the Center for Brain Science, and the Broad Institute of MIT and Harvard.

== Research ==
Park’s early work pioneered single-molecule transistors and electron transport phenomena in nanoscale systems. In 2000, his team reported nanomechanical oscillations in a C_{60} single-molecule transistor, and in 2002, they observed a gate-tunable Kondo resonance in a single-molecule transistor.

He has also contributed to quantum sensing and nanoscale NMR. A 2016 Science paper co-authored by Park demonstrated room-temperature nuclear magnetic resonance detection and spectroscopy of single proteins using a diamond-based quantum sensor.

In two-dimensional semiconductor heterostructures, Park’s group has studied correlated electron phases, including the formation of bilayer Wigner crystals in transition-metal dichalcogenide heterostructures.

Park has also developed novel nano–bio interfaces. His laboratory demonstrated vertical silicon nanoneedles capable of delivering biomolecules into living cells, and later developed CMOS nanoelectrode arrays that enable molecular delivery and intracellular recording of neurons and cardiomyocytes. He also contributed to the development of early pipelines for single-cell RNA sequencing.

He is also known for his invention of novel scanned-probe techniques to help characterize his solution-based synthesis of transition-metal-oxide nanostructures.

== Honors and awards ==
Park’s recognitions include:

- Ho-Am Prize in Science (2003).
- Packard Fellowship for Science and Engineering (2001).
- NIH Director's Pioneer Award (2008).
- Vannevar Bush Faculty Fellowship (2016).
- Elected Fellow, American Association for the Advancement of Science (2011).
- Member, American Academy of Arts and Sciences (2025).

== Editorial and professional service ==
Park has served as an associate editor of Nano Letters and on advisory boards for journals such as Chemical Society Reviews, Chemical Science, and Physical Review Applied. He has been a member of the jury for the BBVA Foundation Frontiers of Knowledge Awards in Basic Sciences.

== Entrepreneurship ==
Park is a scientific co-founder of Quantum Diamond Technologies, Inc. (QDTI), which develops diamond-based quantum sensors, and of CytoTronics, a Harvard spin-out developing semiconductor platforms for cell-based assays. Since 2021, he has served as a senior advisor for Samsung Advanced Institute of Technology.

== Selected publications ==
- H. Park et al., "Nanomechanical oscillations in a single-C_{60} transistor," Nature **407** (2000): 57–60.
- W. Liang, M. P. Shores, M. Bockrath, J. R. Long, H. Park, "Kondo resonance in a single-molecule transistor," Nature **417** (2002): 725–729.
- I. Lovchinsky et al., "Nuclear magnetic resonance detection and spectroscopy of single proteins using quantum logic," Science **351** (2016): 836–841.
- Y. Zhou, J. Sung, E. Brutschea, I. Esterlis, Y. Wang, G. Scuri, R. J. Gelly, H. Heo, T. Taniguchi, K. Watanabe, G. Zaránd, M. D. Lukin, P. Kim, E. Demler, H. Park, "Bilayer Wigner crystals in a transition metal dichalcogenide heterostructure," Nature **595** (2021): 48–52.
- A. K. Shalek, J. T. Robinson, E. S. Karp, J. S. Lee, D.-R. Ahn, M.-H. Yoon, A. Sutton, M. Jorgolli, R. S. Gertner, T. S. Gujral, G. MacBeath, E. G. Yang, H. Park, "Vertical silicon nanowires as a universal platform for delivering biomolecules into living cells," Proceedings of the National Academy of Sciences USA **107** (2010): 1870–1875.
- J. Abbott, T. Ye, L. Qin, M. Jorgolli, R. S. Gertner, D. Ham, H. Park, "CMOS nanoelectrode array for all-electrical intracellular electrophysiological imaging," Nature Nanotechnology **12** (2017): 460–466.
- A. K. Shalek, R. Satija, X. Adiconis, R. S. Gertner, J. T. Gaublomme, R. Raychowdhury, S. Schwartz, N. Yosef, C. Malboeuf, A. Gnirke, A. Goren, N. Hacohen, J. Z. Levin, H. Park, A. Regev, "Single-cell transcriptomics reveals bimodality in expression and splicing in immune cells," Nature **498** (2013): 236–240.

For a full list of publications, see https://scholar.google.com/citations?user=f8t5S4UAAAAJ&hl=en
