= Hemans =

Hemans may refer to:

- Felicia Hemans (1793–1835), English poet
- Charles Isidore Hemans (1817–1876), English antiquary and publisher
- Hemans, Michigan, an unincorporated community on M-53 in the U.S. state of Michigan
