= Galit Alter =

Immunologist and virologist

- Born: 1976 or 1977 (age 48–49)
- Education: Ph.D. in experimental medicine from McGill University
- Awards: MGH Research Scholars Award (twice)
- Scientific career
- Fields: immunology, infectious diseases
- Workplaces: Harvard Medical School; Ragon Institute
- Website: ragoninstitute.org/portfolio-item/alter-lab/

Galit Alter is an immunologist and virologist, professor of medicine at Harvard Medical School, and group leader at the Ragon Institute of MGH, MIT and Harvard. She is known for her work on the expansion of particular natural killer cell subtypes in response to HIV-1 infection. She has also contributed to the understanding of how SARS-CoV-2 antibody titers correlate with sustained humoral protection, including identifying coordinated immune cell-antibody signatures that may predict COVID-19 infection outcome.

From October 2022 to October 2024 she joined Moderna on a sabbatical from the Ragon Institute to lead the immunology group within Infectious Disease Research.
