= Jeffrey Shaman =

- Education: University of Pennsylvania; Columbia University
- Scientific career
- Fields: Environmental health
- Workplaces: Columbia University

Jeffrey Shaman is an American climatologist and infectious disease specialist known for his modeling of COVID-19. He is a professor of climate in the Columbia Climate School and of environmental health sciences in the Columbia University Mailman School of Public Health. He served as interim dean of the Columbia Climate School from July 2023 through December 2024.

== Biography ==
Shaman received his B.A. from the University of Pennsylvania and his Ph.D. from Columbia University. His research centers around the survival, transmission and ecology of infectious agents, and is known for using mathematical and statistical models to model and forecast transmission dynamics of diseases.

Shaman and his team at Columbia built of the first COVID-19 models when the disease broke out in China, and his modeling of the spread of COVID-19 in the United States has been featured on The New York Times and other media outlets.

Shaman also led a study that started in 2016 to model the spread of respiratory diseases throughout Manhattan. The study found that one in nine people were infected with a respiratory virus during February, yet few saw a doctor, making a large number of infections unaccounted for. The project also helped researchers understand how undocumented infections could have contributed to the spread of infectious diseases.
