= Michael Hemann =

American cancer geneticist and associate professor (born 1971)

Michael T. Hemann (born 1971) is an American cancer geneticist and Professor of Biology in the David H. Koch Institute for Integrated Cancer Research at the Massachusetts Institute of Technology. The research in Hemann's laboratory focuses on identification and characterization of genes involved in tumor formation, cancer progression, and chemotherapeutic response.

Michael Hemann was born in Evanston, Illinois, in 1971, but grew up in Shaker Heights, Ohio. He attended Wesleyan University for college, eventually graduating with a bachelor’s degree in molecular biology and biochemistry in 1993. He went on to receive his Ph.D. in human genetics from Johns Hopkins University School of Medicine in 2001. His thesis work was conducted in Carol Greider's lab.

== Publications ==
- Doles J, Oliver TG, Cameron ER, Hsu G, Jacks T, Walker GC, Hemann MT (November 2010). "Suppression of Rev3, the catalytic subunit of Pol{zeta}, sensitizes drug-resistant lung tumors to chemotherapy". Proc Natl Acad Sci U S A. 107 (48): 20786–91. doi:10.1073/pnas.1011409107. PMC 2996428. PMID 21068376.
- Gilbert LA, Hemann MT (October 2010). "DNA damage-mediated induction of a chemoresistant niche". Cell. 143 (3): 355–66. doi:10.1016/j.cell.2010.09.043. PMC 2972353. PMID 21029859.
- Doles J, Hemann MT (February 2010). "Nek4 status differentially alters sensitivity to distinct microtubule poisons". Cancer Res. 70 (3): 1033–41. doi:10.1158/0008-5472.CAN-09-2113. PMC 2946156. PMID 20103636.
- Meacham CE, Ho EE, Dubrovsky E, Gertler FB, Hemann MT (October 2009). "In vivo RNAi screening identifies regulators of actin dynamics as key determinants of lymphoma progression" (PDF). Nat. Genet. 41 (10): 1133–7. doi:10.1038/ng.451. PMC 2756700. PMID 19783987.
- Jiang H, Reinhardt HC, Bartkova J, Tommiska J, Blomqvist C, Nevanlinna H, Bartek J, Yaffe MB, Hemann MT (August 2009). "The combined status of ATM and p53 link tumor development with therapeutic response". Genes Dev. 23 (16): 1895–909. doi:10.1101/gad.1815309. PMC 2725944. PMID 19608766.
