= Masters of the Universe (book) =

2012 book by Daniel Stedman Jones

Masters of the Universe: Hayek, Friedman, and the Birth of Neoliberal Politics
- Author: Daniel Stedman Jones
- Language: English
- Subject: Neoliberalism
- Publisher: Princeton University Press
- Publication date: 2012
- Media type: Print
- Pages: 418
- ISBN: 978-0-691-15157-1

Masters of the Universe: Hayek, Friedman, and the Birth of Neoliberal Politics is a 2012 book by barrister Daniel Stedman Jones, in which the author traces the intellectual development and political rise of neoliberalism in the United States and the United Kingdom. Originally a PhD thesis, the author adapted it into a book.

According to Jones, neoliberalism began after the Great Depression as a movement of intellectuals committed to protecting liberal values of individual liberty and limited government, which they believed were threatened in Britain and the United States by expanding government. They aimed to construct a distinctly new liberalism (hence "neo"-liberalism) by charting a middle way between the laissez-faire economics of the pre-Depression era and the "collectivism" of New Deal liberalism and British social democracy. He argues that between the 1950s and 1970s this commitment evolved into one of greater conviction in the superiority of the free market, such that by the 1980s neoliberal policy proposals centered almost entirely around market liberalization. Modern neoliberalism, according to Jones, is associated with economic liberalism, monetarism, and a staunch support of free market capitalism, and advocates political policies of deregulation, privatization, and other market-based reforms.

Jones structures the book around what he argues are the three phases of the history of neoliberalism. In the first, lasting from roughly 1920 until 1950, he details how early European neoliberal thinkers like Friedrich Hayek, Ludwig von Mises, and Karl Popper, motivated by expanding government and later the rise of totalitarian regimes in Europe during World War II, developed critiques of "collectivism", which to them included British social democracy and American New Deal liberalism. Particularly influential during this time was the formation of the Mont Pelerin Society, which brought together intellectuals committed to the defense of liberalism and individualism.

In the second phase, lasting from roughly 1950 until 1980, the locus of neoliberal thought moved to the United States, where academics like Milton Friedman and George Stigler built upon the earlier neoliberal foundation by developing new academic and political arguments and introducing a range of neoliberal policy prescriptions. During this time, Jones contends neoliberal thought evolved from its more moderate early stance into a "faith" in the power and efficiency of markets. Jones argues that during this period a transatlantic network of intellectuals, businessmen, journalists, and think tanks arose to promote neoliberal ideology, slowly moving neoliberalism out of the political fringes and into the mainstream. The third phase, taking place after 1980, is the period of neoliberal political prominence. After a decade of stagflation in the United States and the United Kingdom, the neoliberal alternative to the Keynesian economic consensus that had dominated politics was adopted by politicians, finding particular influence with US president Ronald Reagan and British prime minister Margaret Thatcher. This era, Jones notes, was characterized by sweeping deregulation, market liberalization, and tax reductions.

== Structure ==
The book is divided into an introduction, seven chapters, and a conclusion.

- The introduction summarizes the history of neoliberalism and lays out the structure of the book.
- Chapter one ("The Postwar Settlement") provides context for the rise of neoliberalism by briefly describing the development of embedded liberalism and Keynesianism after the Great Depression.
- Chapter two ("The 1940s: The Emergence of the Neoliberal Critique") discusses the critiques of social democracy by the early neoliberals Karl Popper, Ludwig von Mises, and Friedrich Hayek, and outlines the birth of the Mont Pelerin Society.
- Chapter three ("The Rising Tide: Neoliberal Ideas in the Postwar Period) discusses the two Chicago Schools, the relation of Adam Smith to neoliberalism, the early ideas of Milton Friedman, the ordoliberals in West Germany, and the economic theories of regulatory capture, public choice, and rational choice theory.
- Chapter four ("A Transatlantic Network: Think Tanks and the Ideological Entrepreneurs") discusses fusionism in the United States, conservatism in Britain during the 1950s, the growth of neoliberal organizations and think tanks from the 1950s through the 1970s, and the spread of neoliberal thought to journalists and politicians.
- Chapter five ("Keynesianism and the Emergence of Monetarism, 1945–71) discusses Keynesianism, American economic policy in the 1960s, and the development of monetarism by Milton Friedman.
- Chapter six ("Economic Strategy: The Neoliberal Breakthrough, 1971-84") discusses the stagflation of the 1970s in the United States and United Kingdom and how it set the stage for the political rise of monetarism, which ushered in further neoliberal reforms; it continues with a description of the neoliberal policies of British prime ministers James Callaghan and Margaret Thatcher, Chancellor of the Exchequer Denis Healey, US presidents Jimmy Carter and Ronald Reagan, and Chair of the Federal Reserve Paul Volcker.
- Chapter seven ("Neoliberalism Applied? The Transformation of Affordable Housing and Urban Policy in the United States and Britain, 1945–2000") considers the effects of neoliberal policies on housing and urban policy in the United States and the United Kingdom.
- The conclusion ("The Legacy of Transatlantic Neoliberalism: Faith-Based Policy") discusses the lasting effects of neoliberalism and lays out the author's belief in the need to return "reason-based policymaking" to political and economic debates.

== Summary ==
"Neoliberalism was a radical form of individualism that was first generated before World War II in reaction to New Liberalism, Progressivism, the New Deal, and the onset of Nazi and communist totalitarianism. Together, these strands were called 'collectivism' by neoliberals."

The author divides the history of neoliberalism into three phases.

In the first phase, lasting from 1920 to 1950, Jones contends that the crises of the Great Depression and Second World War produced two competing economic ideologies: Keynesianism and neoliberalism. Keynesianism, developed by economist John Maynard Keynes and motivated by the widespread unemployment during the Great Depression, viewed government intervention in the economy as a means to alleviate economic downturns and achieve full employment. Neoliberalism, promoted by economists like Friedrich Hayek, Milton Friedman, and Ludwig von Mises, and arising out of fears of totalitarian regimes like the Nazis, Soviet communists, and Italian fascists, viewed increasing government intervention as a threat to economic and political freedom. Early neoliberal thought, according to Jones, focused on defending liberalism and critiquing all forms of collectivism, and in particular on critiquing New Deal liberalism and British social democracy, which they believed posed a "grave threat to the continued existence of Western civilization".

In the second phase, lasting from 1950 to 1980, Jones notes that Keynesianism dominated political policy while neoliberal thought was mostly confined to universities and think tanks. However, it was during this time that neoliberal thought was refined and spread, creating a transatlantic network of intellectuals, businessmen, journalists, university departments and think tanks promoting neoliberal ideas. The locus of neoliberal thought shifted from Europe to the United States, with the American intellectuals Milton Friedman and George Stigler, as well as the larger Chicago school of economics they were a part of, becoming increasingly influential. Neoliberal thought evolved: whereas the neoliberalism that had emerged during the interwar years had been a "nuanced response" to war, depression and totalitarian regimes, late-twentieth-century neoliberalism became dominated by market liberalization and globalization, and galvanized around a defense of the superiority of free markets to government economic planning.

The third phase, lasting from 1980 onward (the book was released in 2012), is the period of neoliberal political hegemony. Jones suggests that the high inflation and low economic growth in the United States and United Kingdom during the 1970s chipped away at the Keynesian political consensus, which seemed unable to address the decade's stagflation. Jones argues that the transatlantic neoliberal network provided a compelling alternative economic ideology—one that conveniently included monetarism, an economic theory dealing with inflation. Jones asserts that this led to the widespread political acceptance of neoliberal policies in the 1980s, which brought with it a greater acceptance of neoliberal ideology. Jones maintains that, contrary to the opinion of some observers, the adoption of neoliberal policies was not an inevitability; they were not necessarily the "right" policies for the challenges of the era, but instead found political power through an "unpredictable, patchy" process that had "luck and historical contingency" as central players. The left-leaning Carter administration and Callaghan government were the first to implement certain neoliberal policies, but neoliberalism would find its greatest impact with US president Ronald Reagan and British prime minister Margaret Thatcher, who would each successfully advance agendas of deregulation, tax cuts, and market liberalization. Jones argues that while these incremental policy changes did not require a wholesale acceptance of neoliberal philosophy, by the late 1980s that is exactly what had happened. Neoliberal ideas on the superiority of the market and individual liberty became widely accepted by politicians and academics, and Jones contends that this "boundless belief in markets and deregulation" ultimately led to the 2008 financial crisis.

=== First phase: Early history (1920–1950) ===
According to Jones, neoliberalism traces its earliest beginnings to the establishment of the Colloque Walter Lippmann in 1938. The Great Depression left the reputation of economic liberalism in tatters, and the scholars at the society sought to "reconstruct a theory of liberalism" because they believed that "classical liberalism was under assault". They called this reconstruction "neoliberalism" to signify that they were not simply accepting laissez-faire economics but were developing a new vision of economic liberalism. Ultimately, however, the ideas promoted at the colloquium did not take political hold, and at the outset of World War II the colloquium was largely forgotten.

The destruction wrought by totalitarian regimes during World War II would, however, energize a number of liberal thinkers in their opposition to collectivism. From this fear of collectivism emerged the early influential neoliberal texts critiquing social democracy, and led to the formation of a new neoliberal organization by many of the same individuals present at the Colloque Walter Lippman: the Mont Pelerin Society.

==== Mont Pelerin Society ====
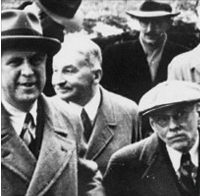
Trygve J. B. Hoff, editor of Farmand, (left) and Austrian economist Ludwig von Mises (middle) at the Mont Pelerin Society in 1947

Jones outlines how, after the catastrophes of World War II, Friedrich Hayek convened a group of intellectuals to combat the trend of increasing government intervention in the United Kingdom and the United States and "develop an organizational and intellectual strategy" to "defend the core tenets of...the freedom of the individual." This group called itself the Mont Pelerin Society, after the venue of its first meeting in Vevey, Switzerland. The society set out to develop a neoliberal alternative to, on the one hand, the laissez-faire economic consensus that had collapsed with the Great Depression and, on the other, New Deal liberalism and British social democracy, collectivist trends which they believed posed a threat to individual freedom. A distinct neoliberal worldview, Jones contends, emerged "on the foundations of the critique of New Deal liberalism and social democracy" developed by the intellectuals of the Society.

Jones finds three Mont Pelerin individuals particularly influential: Karl Popper, Ludwig von Mises, and Friedrich Hayek. Popper, in his book The Open Society and its Enemies, criticized thinkers from Plato to Karl Marx for valuing the collective over the individual and derided teleological historicism (a theory which holds that history unfolds inexorably according to universal laws) as a threat to individualism—which he believed underpins Western civilization—because it reduces the individual to "a cog in the machine" of history and empowers governments to engage in the sorts of "Utopian engineering" that has motivated communists, socialists, and Nazis. Mises, in his book Bureaucracy, argued the superiority of the private market motivated by profit over the bureaucratic management inherent in government. Hayek, in his book The Road to Serfdom, argued effective central planning was impossible because no individual or group could ever possess the requisite knowledge to direct the economic activity of millions of people.

The early Mont Pelerin Society, Jones notes, had little effect on political policy. Instead, it acted as "a siren call, a warning about the tragic possibilities of moving in the direction" of greater collectivist government intervention "which Western politics, economy, and society seemed to be moving." Importantly, Jones argues it helped to "create a transatlantic neoliberal network that would...combat the New Deal and social-democratic political establishments in Britain and the United States", "combat the forces of collectivism", and refine neoliberal thought into a workable set of policies.

=== Second phase: Emergence of a transatlantic neoliberal network (1950–1980) ===
Jones outlines how a transatlantic network of neoliberal intellectuals, businessmen, journalists, university departments, and think tanks arose between 1950 and 1980 and, building on the foundations of the critiques of New Deal liberalism and social democracy of the early neoliberals, refined and popularized neoliberal ideas to the point that "they eventually seemed the natural alternative to liberal or social democratic policies". This network would serve "almost like a kind of Neoliberal International" that would be highly influential in the later adoption of neoliberal policies by the governments of the United States and United Kingdom. During this time, the locus of neoliberal thought shifted from Europe to America, with the American economist Milton Friedman becoming its most influential proponent—its "beating heart", as Jones describes it. Neoliberalism, according to Jones, evolved from an attempt to find a middle way between laissez-faire capitalism and collectivism into a "faith in free markets", often articulating "individual liberty in apocalyptic terms as a struggle between free societies and communist totalitarianism". Neoliberals of the era emphasized the need to recover "lost truths" from classical liberalism, including the value of individual liberty, the invisible hand of the free market, and the virtues of limited government. By the 1960s, Jones contends, neoliberal thought had established a "distinct and coherent identity" centered around "individual liberty, free markets, spontaneous order, the price mechanism, competition, consumerism, deregulation, and rational self-interest". Additionally, during this period a body of policy prescriptions was injected into neoliberalism.

Jones points to an early essay by Milton Friedman entitled "Neoliberalism and its Prospects" as a "bridge" between the first phase of neoliberal thought—dominated by European concerns—and the second phase, centered in the United States and concerned more with economic freedom and the superiority of markets. Jones considers the essay a "useful marker of the moment when neoliberalism became a self-conscious political and economic concept in the United States", as it was one of the first instances in which an American writer claimed the neoliberal moniker. In the essay Friedman makes a quintessentially first-phase argument for a "new faith" between collectivism, which he believed leads to an over-mighty state, and laissez-faire economics, which he believed fostered the development of over-mighty individuals. However, the essay marked a "symbolic cutting off point" in neoliberal thought, signifying the point in time when neoliberalism began to shift away from the early "middle way" arguments to a more strident belief in free markets. Friedman himself advocated a level of government intervention in the essay that he would never again publicly support.

==== Academic thought ====
According to Jones: "After 1945, a distinct neoliberal worldview was built on the foundations of the critique of New Deal liberalism and social democracy synthesized in the writings of Ludwig von Mises, Friedrich Hayek, and Karl Popper...Its main tenets—philosophical, political, and economic—were worked out in detail by scholars such as Milton Friedman, George Stigler, Gary Becker, James Buchanan, and Gordon Tullock, as well as Hayek and Mises."

Jones asserts that the Chicago school of economics, of which Friedman and Stigler were a part, was "perhaps the most influential group in terms of the development of transatlantic neoliberal politics". In the 1950s, 1960s, and 1970s Chicago economists published influential works arguing for free market policies and extending free market analyses into new regions (e.g. law and regulation). They painted a hostile portrait of trade unions and presented monopolies as mostly benign.

The theories of regulatory capture, public choice theory, and rational choice theory all became influential to neoliberal thought, according to Jones, because they connected the market to politics and the public sector, and helped the neoliberal view of free markets seep into mainstream public and political consciousness. The economist George Stigler argued that government regulatory bodies often become captured by private industry, so that these bodies act in the interests of private corporations rather than in the public's interest—a notion known as "regulatory capture". James Buchanan and Gordon Tullock, considered the "fathers of public choice theory", emphasized the imperfections of political institutions and constitutional mechanisms, and argued voters have a tendency to vote their own interest rather than in the public interest.

==== Milton Friedman and monetarism ====
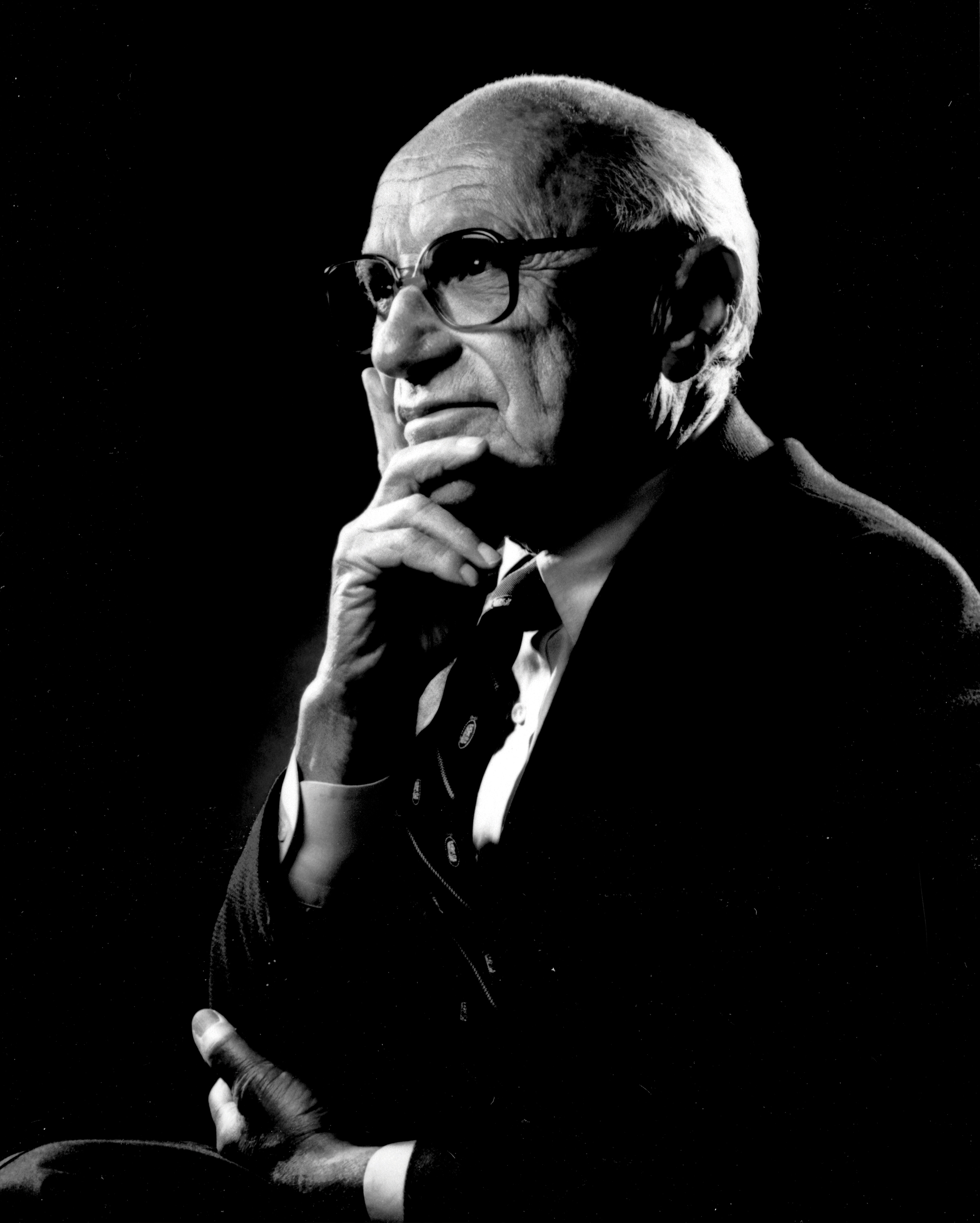
Milton Friedman

Milton Friedman became a leading figure of neoliberal thought and a prominent public intellectual in the 1950s. An American, Friedman was less influenced by the effects of World War II and more by the subsequent Cold War between the United States and the Soviet Union. Jones argues that for neoliberals "the Cold War necessitated the unambiguous advocacy of the superiority of the market", and Friedman framed the "war of ideas" between socialism and free-market capitalism as a "life-or-death struggle."

Jones argues that "Friedman's significant contribution to neoliberal thought was his connection of economic freedom with political freedom", which he made in his popular book Capitalism and Freedom (which Jones describes as the "American Road to Serfdom"). Friedman argued that free markets and liberal democracy are inseparable, that the market guarantees basic political freedoms by ensuring that alternatives are always available (e.g. alternative employment options or alternative goods), guarantees equality by divorcing economic activities from anything unrelated to an individual's productivity, and protects dissent by separating economic power (i.e. the ability to make money) from political power (in other words, politicians cannot deprive an individual of employment if they express political dissent). Friedman consistently pointed out his view that "increases in economic freedom have gone hand in hand with increases in political and civil freedom and have led to increased prosperity; competitive capitalism and freedom have become inseparable", and pointed to countries like China under Deng Xiaoping and Chile to justify this.

Jones notes that Friedman was a harsh critic of government intervention in the economy. A key point of Capitalism and Freedom, according to Jones, was outlining government failure, including in the areas of railroad regulation, labor law, monetary reform, agriculture, public housing, social security legislation, foreign aid, urban redevelopment, and income tax. In A Monetary History of the United States, Friedman blamed the Great Depression on overly tight monetary policy by the Federal Reserve. Friedman linked New Deal liberalism with socialism and communism, while he considered his own ideas as a part of the classical liberal family.

Friedman's development of the macroeconomic theory of monetarism was particularly influential to neoliberalism. Jones argues that the Keynesian consensus that had dominated political thought in the United States and United Kingdom for decades had prioritized low unemployment over inflation. In contrast, by the 1950s neoliberal thinkers began to emphasize inflation. Friedman ultimately developed monetarism, a macroeconomic theory dealing with inflation and the supply of money that suggested that the Keynesian view that government can achieve full employment at the cost of limited inflation was incorrect and would lead to higher inflation in the long run. Friedman argued that governments and central banks, rather than focusing on employment, should focus on ensuring a constant and predictable level of monetary growth. Jones describes monetarism as "the most consistent, systematic, and significant alternative economic strategy to Keynesian demand management and fine-tuning". This, according to Jones, primed neoliberal theory for political acceptance in the United States and United Kingdom, who would experience persistent stagflation during the 1970s. Jones sums it up as such: "Friedman's monetarist analysis and market solutions grabbed people's attention as a ready-made and plausible alternative strategy [to Keynesianism] when the economy began to unravel [in the 1970s] under the weight of stagflation".

==== Think tanks ====
In Britain and the United States, the neoliberal right built a "dazzling array of think tanks", which became the preferred vehicle of neoliberal thinkers. Notable among these, according to Jones, were the American Enterprise Institute, the Foundation for Economic Education, the Institute of Economic Affairs, The Heritage Foundation, the Cato Institute, the Adam Smith Institute, and a group of think tanks emanating out of the Atlas Foundation, including the Fraser Institute, the Fisher Institute, and the Manhattan Institute. These think tanks brought politicians and businesspeople into contact with neoliberal ideas and thinkers and raised the public profile of free-market policies. In particular, the Heritage Foundation had a significant influence on US president Ronald Reagan—claiming on its website that nearly two-thirds of the proposals they suggested to him in their policy guide Mandate for Leadership were implemented—while the Adam Smith Institute had appreciable sway with the Thatcher government. Jones notes that many of these institutes were funded by wealthy businessmen, such as Charles Koch and Joseph Coors.

==== Relation to conservatism ====
Free market economics has been associated with the political right, but Jones emphasizes that it is "but one branch" of it. In the United States, he argues that the right had a number of often-competing interests (principally traditionalism, anticommunism, and neoliberalism), but the "distinctive feature of the conservative revival in the 1950s and 1960s was the ability of its disparate elements to unite under the banners of anticommunism and states' rights"—a union that became known as "fusionism". This union, which Jones largely credits William F. Buckley Jr. for achieving, led to the growth of a conservative establishment that would, after decades of decline, rival its liberal opponents. This "pave[d] the way for the later electoral successes of Ronald Reagan", which would usher in neoliberal policies.

=== Third phase: Policy implementation (1980 onward) ===
"The demise of the postwar economic settlement had been hastened by a series of catastrophic events: the Vietnam War, the first oil shock of 1973, and the near collapse of industrial relations in Britain. The Keynes-inspired policies that governments had relied on to deliver a golden age of prosperity and rising incomes for a generation after 1945 seemed exhausted. The collapse of the Bretton Woods international monetary system in 1971 indicated the end of the experiment with fixed exchange rates. The assumption that there was a relatively simple and manipulable trade-off between inflation and employment, the famous Phillips Curve...proved to be a dangerous illusion...In both Britain and the United States, the appearance of stagflation...meant that governments felt forced to change course."

Jones notes that there were two major issues facing the United States and the United Kingdom at the end of the 1960s: the instability of the Bretton Woods international monetary system and high inflation. As Jones describes it: "the late 1960s and early 1970s brought a succession of economic shocks that undermined the postwar international monetary system and pushed the world economy into stormy waters. The final stage in the shift in economic strategy in Britain and the United States, the reason neoliberal ideas found a receptive audience, was the force of these events." The proposed neoliberal solutions of monetarism, deregulation, and trade union reform, as well as the wealth of neoliberal arguments against the prevailing Keynesian demand management, provided a "powerfully compelling logic", and neoliberal policies were soon adopted by British and American politicians. Yet these economic solutions acted as mere "Trojan horses for a more polemical neoliberal faith in free markets", which would come to dominate politics in the United States and the United Kingdom.

Rate of inflation in the United States (1914-2009)

Neoliberal policies, according to Jones, were first introduced in the United States by Democratic president Jimmy Carter and in the United Kingdom by Labour prime minister James Callaghan. However, their approaches were examples of "governments of the left who accept[ed] the logic of the technical insights of Friedman and Stigler in terms of macroeconomic strategy or deregulation without also importing their neoliberal philosophies". It would be their successors, Ronald Reagan in the United States and Margaret Thatcher in the United Kingdom, who Jones argues embodied the neoliberal belief in the "supremacy of the free market". They would also have the greatest impact on neoliberal policy implementation, successfully advancing agendas of deregulation, lower taxes, and market liberalization. He emphasizes the importance of the transatlantic neoliberal network on Reagan and Thatcher, noting that "many of their most important advisers, government colleagues, and supporters were drawn from the transatlantic neoliberal network".

==== Jimmy Carter and Paul Volcker ====
Jones argues that the implementation of neoliberal policy in the United States began with US president Jimmy Carter, who Jones notes had been strongly influenced by neoliberal economist George Stigler. During the Carter presidency (1977–1981) the airline, trucking, and financial industries were deregulated.

Jones suggests that "perhaps the single most important economic policy decision made by Carter was his appointment of Paul Volcker in August 1979 to replace [George William] Miller as chairman of the Federal Reserve". Volcker aggressively and successfully targeted inflation by raising interest rates, bringing inflation down from a high point of nearly 15% in 1980 to 3%.

==== Ronald Reagan ====
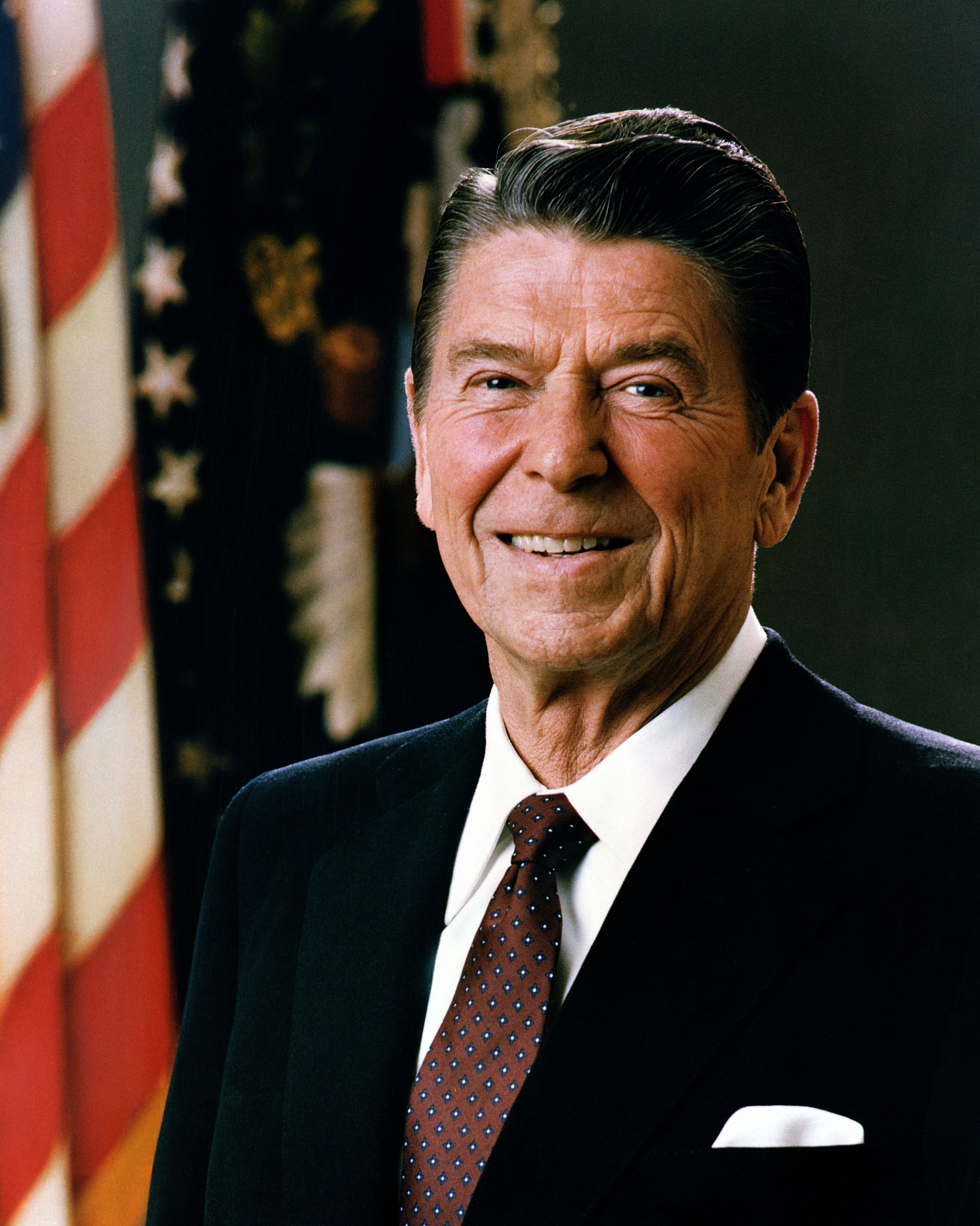
Ronald Reagan presidential portrait

In 1981, Ronald Reagan became president of the United States. Jones argues that the Reagan administration "followed neoliberal principles influenced particularly by the ideas of Friedrich Hayek, Milton Friedman, George Stigler, and Pat Buchanan". This can be seen in the four policy proposals Jones argues Reagan prioritized:

1. Increased deregulation and market liberalization
2. Tighter control of the money supply
3. Tax cuts
4. Cuts to public spending

The administration lifted economic controls on oil, busted the air traffic controller's union and fired all the striking workers (in the United States most air traffic controllers are employed by the federal government), and implemented significant tax cuts, including reducing the top marginal tax rate from 70% to 28%. Jones argues that Reagan's tax cuts were motivated by arguments including the philosophy of limited government promoted by Friedman and other neoliberals; the idea developed by economist Arthur Laffer that tax revenue would increase as tax rates dropped because, as Jones summarized Laffer's argument, "more people would pay taxes and fewer would attempt tax avoidance"; and the belief that lower taxes lead to increased investment by the wealthy, which boosts economic growth and thereby benefits all members of society (a belief that would become known as trickle-down economics).

==== Margaret Thatcher ====
Margaret Thatcher became Prime Minister of the United Kingdom in 1979, ushering in a broad range of supply-side reforms and monetarist macroeconomic policies. Jones contends that "the key early battle for the Conservative government had been driving through a tough slew of measures to bring the deficit under control and create the conditions for economic recovery in the famous budget of 1981". The government combined budget cuts with a "reorientation of the tax system to provide greater incentives for entrepreneurship".

Monetarist policy had first been introduced by the Callaghan Labour government, which had instituted monetary targets and cash limits. Monetarist policy was continued under the Thatcher government. Jones places "the major differences, and the real departure in economic terms, between the Callaghan government and the Conservatives lay in their radicalization of microeconomic policy through various market-based supply-side reforms and their importation of market mechanisms into public service provision".

==== Effects ====
"Neoliberalism transformed British, American, and global politics. At the dawn of the twenty-first century, the triumph of the free market was almost universally accepted by mainstream politicians, public officials, and civil servants. More important, the distinctive neoliberal brand of free market individualism had prevailed over alternative forms of managed market-based capitalism."

Jones believes that the "neoliberal contribution to the political changes of the last third of the twentieth century in Britain and the United States have been massive", and includes not only the considerable reforms that Reagan and Thatcher implemented but also the effects neoliberalism had on introducing "a new economic policy framework...[that] governed the policies and ambitions of Bill Clinton, Tony Blair, Gordon Brown, and Barack Obama". Neoliberalism resulted in a "broad breakdown of the characteristic mid-twentieth century belief in the efficacy and moral superiority of government and collective action" in favor of a belief in the efficacy of markets. Additionally, he notes that neoliberalism was extended into international development and trade through the structural adjustment policies of the International Monetary Fund, the World Bank, and the World Trade Organization, which were dominated by neoliberal economists in the late 20th century. He argues that this ultimately had mixed effects:

"Some of the most powerful insights of [neoliberal] thinkers did help to address pressing social and economic issues by increasing homeownership or stabilizing persistently high inflation. But such successes were not so numerous as to make the effect of transatlantic neoliberal politics anything better than ambivalent...neoliberal policies tended to affect the most vulnerable members of society in the harshest ways.

During the last two decades of the [20th] century, inequality (the gap between rich and poor), poverty, and homelessness all increased. Unemployment seemingly disappeared as a major problem in the immediate postwar years but returned with a vengeance after the 1970s. Inflation...[was] cowed...by the uncompromising policies of central bankers and pliant politicians in the early 1980s. In Britain, unemployment and inflation returned during another deep recession by the time Thatcher was forced from office in October 1990."

Furthermore, Jones believes that "the most important reason for the financial crisis was the direct result of neoliberal policies" of financial deregulation. He argues that the neoliberal "faith in markets had become divorced from reality", with crisis-level effects.

== Reception ==
The book was a finalist for the Western Social Science Association's 2014 Presidents’ Book Award and shortlisted for the 2012 Gladstone Prize. It has received mixed reviews.

The Economist praised the book as a "bold biography of a great idea", describing it as a "novel and comprehensive history of neoliberalism" that, while "a little thin on character sketches and economics", is a "strong work" by a "fair and nuanced writer". James McAuley, writing in the magazine Prospect, claims that Jones "has produced an ideal kind of intellectual history—an investigation that shows that the reigning free market paradigm was not the inevitable end of progressive policy developments...it was instead a programme that was actively promoted by a network of intellectuals and institutions, and it depended on external political circumstances for its success". Alejandro Chafuen, former president of the Atlas Economic Research Foundation and member of the Mont Pelerin Society, writes in Forbes that he appreciates that the author's "lengthy exposition of the views shared by these outstanding economists (Friedman, Hayek, and Mises) might encourage many to pay attention to their works". Jennifer Burns, writing in The American Prospect, states that "Jones’s provocative if disconcerting argument deserves wide consideration. So does Masters of the Universe, which does much to help explain the aftermath of 2008 and the ways in which political responses that might have defined another era seem unthinkable in ours". Kirkus Reviews called it "a cerebral, pertinent exegesis on the thinking behind the rise of the New Right", though notes that it is "too scholarly for most general readers". Glenn C. Altschuler, writing in the Pittsburgh Post-Gazette, states that the author "draws on extensive archival research and interviews with politicians, policy-makers and intellectuals to provide a lucid, richly detailed examination of the evolution of the free-market ideology since the end of World War II".

Scott Sumner, writing in the magazine Reason, calls the book "a balanced and informative study of neoliberal thinkers", however he believes that Jones, in his criticism of neoliberalism as prone to market fundamentalism, "misses the bigger picture for three reasons: He underestimates the extent to which neoliberalism was built on impressive economic research, he overstates the extent to which neoliberalism became associated with modern conservatism, and he overstates the neoliberals' opposition to government". Daniel Ben-Ami, writing in Financial Times, praised the book as "clearly written and relevant to a wide audience", noting it "incorporates a wealth of primary material", although he states Jones "fails to capture fully the failures or successes of neoliberal thought". Edward Nik-Khah, writing for the Economic History Association, calls it an "accessible introduction" to the intellectual history of neoliberalism, criticizing it only for "some of Jones’s framing choices" which "get in the way of understanding [the] complex history [of neoliberalism]". He notes that the book does not explicitly state who the "masters of the universe" are.

Paul Kelly, writing for the London School of Economics Review of Books, criticizes the book as being "overambitious", lamenting that "the connections between the various [neoliberal] thinkers are ambiguous, fortuitous or at best under explained" and stating that the book "sadly fails to deliver on its promise" of delivering "an analysis and critique of the dominant language of political economy of the last four decades – neoliberalism"; he also criticizes the book for "assuming a polemical concept (neoliberalism) as an ideological unity". Kenneth Minogue, writing for The Wall Street Journal, claims that, while the book "has intelligent things to say", its "historical virtues are compromised by more adjectival attitudinizing than a chronicler of history should allow himself"; for instance, "free-market ideas are characterized as 'aggressive,' 'relentless' and 'uncritical,' culminating in the description of market enthusiasm as a 'holy grail' and the use of a variety of religious metaphors designed to suggest that it is irrational". Greg Kaza, writing in the Quarterly Journal of Austrian Economics published by The Mises Institute, criticized the book for neglecting to include information from the archives of Ludwig von Mises and for selective reporting on the 1960s-era U.S. civil rights movement.
