= Daniel Herschlag =

American biochemist

- Born: October 16, 1958 (age 68)
- Education: Binghamton University, Brandeis University, University of Colorado at Boulder
- Known for: Enzymology RNA biochemistry
- Awards: William C. Rose Award (2010)
- Scientific career
- Fields: Biochemistry
- Workplaces: Stanford University
- Doctoral advisor: William Jencks
- Other academic advisors: Tom Cech
- Doctoral students: Rhiju Das Geeta Narlikar

Daniel Herschlag (born October 16, 1958) is an American biochemist and Professor of Biochemistry at the Stanford University School of Medicine. His research uses an interdisciplinary approach to advance our understanding of the fundamental behavior of RNA and proteins. He is well known for his application of rigorous kinetic and mechanistic approaches to RNA and protein systems.

== Education ==
Herschlag received a B.S. degree in biochemistry from Binghamton University in 1982. He began his graduate studies at University of Minnesota then moved on to complete his Ph.D. degree in Biochemistry at Brandeis University under W.P. Jencks in 1988.

== Career ==
Herschlag was a Helen Hay Whitney Postdoctoral Fellow at the University of Colorado at Boulder from 1989 to 1992. He conducted post-doctoral research on the mechanism of the newly discovered RNA self-splicing reaction in the lab of Tom Cech.

In 1992, Herschlag joined the faculty of the Department of Biochemistry in the Stanford University School of Medicine, earning tenure in 1997. He was promoted to full professor in 2002.

In 2011, he was appointed the Senior Associate Dean of Graduate Education and Postdoctoral Affairs for the Stanford University School of Medicine.

== Selected awards ==
- Pfizer Award in Enzyme Chemistry, 1997
- Cope Scholar Award from the American Chemical Society, 2000
- ASBMB William Rose Award, 2010
- National Academy of Sciences Inductee, 2018
- Biophysical Society Founders Award, 2020

== Selected publications ==
- Herschlag, Daniel; Cech, Thomas R. (1990). "DNA cleavage catalysed by the ribozyme from Tetrahymena". Nature. 344 (6265): 405–9. Bibcode:1990Natur.344..405H. doi:10.1038/344405a0. PMID 1690858. S2CID 4242188.
- Herschlag, Daniel (1995). "RNA Chaperones and the RNA Folding Problem". The Journal of Biological Chemistry. 270 (36): 20871–4. doi:10.1074/jbc.270.36.20871. PMID 7545662.
- O'Brien, Patrick J; Herschlag, Daniel (1999). "Catalytic promiscuity and the evolution of new enzymatic activities". Chemistry & Biology. 6 (4): R91–R105. doi:10.1016/S1074-5521(99)80033-7. PMID 10099128.
- Russell, Rick; Zhuang, Xiaowei; Babcock, Hazen P.; Millett, Ian S.; Doniach, Sebastian; Chu, Steven; Herschlag, Daniel (2001). "Exploring the Folding Landscape of a Structured RNA". Proceedings of the National Academy of Sciences. 99 (1): 155–60. Bibcode:2002PNAS...99..155R. doi:10.1073/pnas.221593598. JSTOR 3057508. PMC 117531. PMID 11756689.
- Zalatan, Jesse G.; Herschlag, Daniel (2006). "Alkaline Phosphatase Mono- and Diesterase Reactions: Comparative Transition State Analysis". Journal of the American Chemical Society. 128 (4): 1293–303. doi:10.1021/ja056528r. PMC 2538955. PMID 16433548.
- Solomatin, Sergey V.; Greenfeld, Max; Chu, Steven; Herschlag, Daniel (2010). "Multiple native states reveal persistent ruggedness of an RNA folding landscape". Nature. 463 (7281): 681–4. Bibcode:2010Natur.463..681S. doi:10.1038/nature08717. PMC 2818749. PMID 20130651.
- Shin, John H.; Bonilla, Steve L.; Denny, Sarah K.; Greenleaf, William J.; Herschlag, Daniel (2023). "Dissecting the energetic architecture within an RNA tertiary structural motif via high-throughput thermodynamic measurements". Proc Natl Acad Sci U S A. 120 (11) e2220485120. Bibcode:2023PNAS..12020485S. doi:10.1073/pnas.2220485120. PMC 10243134. PMID 36897989.

== Personal ==
Herschlag currently lives in El Granada, CA with his wife and two children.

== See also ==
- List of RNA biologists
