= Ragon Institute =

Medical institute in Massachusetts, U.S.

Coordinates: 42.364°N 71.092°W

Phillip T. and Susan M. Ragon Institute
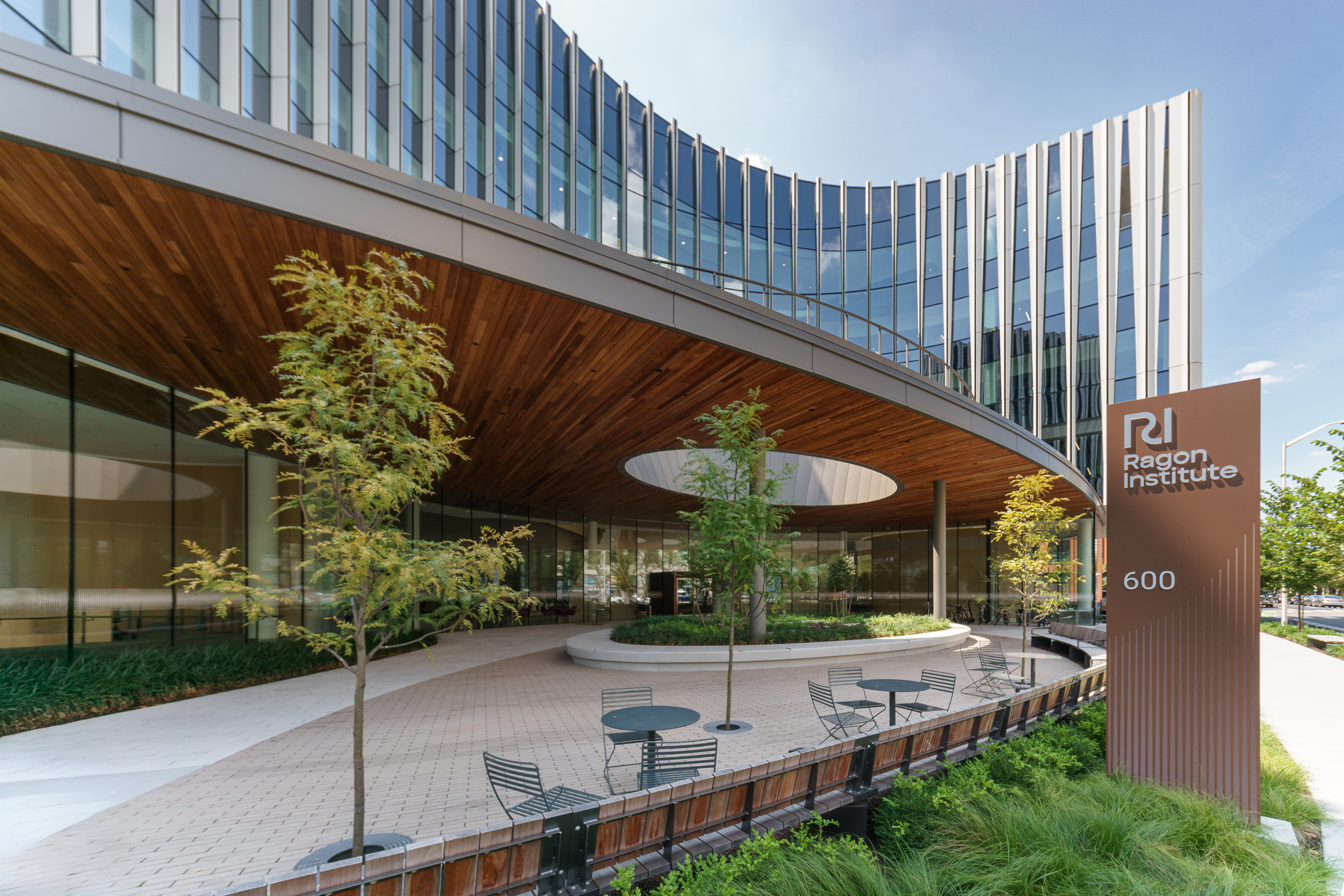
- Type: Medical Research Institute
- Established: February 2009
- Founders: Phillip T. Ragon, Susan M. Ragon
- Affiliations: MGH, MIT, Harvard University, Broad Institute
- Location: Cambridge, Massachusetts, USA
- Campus: 400 Technology Square; 600 Main Street
- Website: https://www.ragoninstitute.org

Phillip T. and Susan M. Ragon Institute is a medical institute founded in 2009 at the Massachusetts General Hospital (MGH) by the funding from founder and CEO of InterSystems Phillip Ragon and his wife Susan Ragon to find vaccines for diseases of the immune system, particularly HIV/AIDS. The institute includes scientists from Harvard University, the Massachusetts Institute of Technology (MIT) and the MGH, a level I trauma center which is the largest teaching hospital affiliated with Harvard Medical School.

The Ragon Institute's scientific leadership comprises a diverse group of immunologists, geneticists, infectious disease specialists and computational and systems biologists from the MGH, MIT, Harvard, the Broad Institute, Harvard-affiliated hospitals in Boston and from other institutions housing satellite collaborators around the country.

== History ==
The Ragon Institute was founded in February 2009 through a $100 million gift – the largest gift in Massachusetts General Hospital (MGH) history – from the Phillip T. and Susan M. Ragon Institute Foundation. Administratively based at MGH, the Ragon Institute incorporates the work of the Partners AIDS Research Center at MGH. Instead of the typical academic approach, in which individual scientists work independently, the Ragon Institute includes engineering disciplines to facilitate new experimental approaches and incorporate fresh ways of viewing complex biological systems, with the goal of rapidly advancing innovative, interdisciplinary research to revolutionize the field of immunology.

In 2012, the Ragon Institute launched FRESH (Females Rising through Education, Support, and Health) in South Africa to connect HIV vaccine research with efforts to reduce poverty, a major driver of infection. Based in a former black township near Durban, FRESH trains young women in life skills, computer skills, and HIV prevention, while also working to detect early HIV infections and advance biomedical understanding. The program has helped over 1,200 women, most of whom have stayed uninfected and moved on to jobs or school.

In January 2013, the Ragon Institute completed its relocation to 400 Technology Square in Cambridge, Massachusetts.

On March 21, 2013, researchers at the Ragon Institute of MGH, MIT, and Harvard University introduced a new method for identifying potential HIV vaccine targets. The team, led by Arup K. Chakraborty, developed a computational technique to analyze viral protein sequences, helping to identify weak points in viral strains that could be exploited for vaccine development. By understanding how different viral strains reproduce in the body, the researchers aim to design protein fragments (peptides) targeting these vulnerabilities, with plans to test them in animals.

In 2016, Dr. Facundo Batista joined the Ragon Institute as Scientific Director, strengthening its research capabilities and commitment to advancing immunology.

On May 2, 2019, Massachusetts General Hospital received a $200 million donation by Phillip T. (Terry) and Susan M. Ragon to endow the Ragon Institute of MGH, MIT, and Harvard.

At the same time, researchers at Harvard Medical School, based at the Ragon Institute of MGH, MIT, and Harvard, identified specific amino acids in the HIV protein structure that are crucial for the virus's function and replication. They found that the immune systems of individuals who can naturally control HIV infection target these amino acids with CD8 T cells, even in those who don't carry the HLA-B protein variants typically linked to HIV control. The findings, published in Science.

On July 17, 2019, Swiss lawyer Ursula Brunner made a $5 million donation to the Ragon Institute of MGH, MIT, and Harvard. The gift will create the Brunner Fund for Medical Discovery, Education, and Social Good, supporting the institute's FRESH Program.

On April 22, 2020, researchers from MIT, the Ragon Institute of MGH, MIT, and Harvard, and the Broad Institute of MIT and Harvard identified specific cells that are more susceptible to infection by the SARS-CoV-2 virus, which causes COVID-19. By analyzing RNA data from various cell types, the team pinpointed cells in the lungs, nasal passages, and intestines that express high levels of the two proteins that allow the virus to enter human cells.

In April 2021, at the CROI conference, Xu Yu, M.D., from the Ragon Institute (a collaboration between Massachusetts General Hospital, MIT, and Harvard), presented groundbreaking findings about "elite controllers"—individuals with HIV who naturally suppress the virus without the need for medication. Among these controllers, two individuals suppressed the virus so effectively that no active virus could be detected in their systems, even at very low levels.

At the same year, the Ragon Institute began construction on a new research facility, designed to provide expanded laboratory space, enhance collaboration, and support a growing community of scientists, engineers, and clinicians.

On January 22, 2024, ReiThera Srl, the Ragon Institute, and IAVI announced a collaboration to develop a novel HIV vaccine candidate. The vaccine will use ReiThera's GRAd vector and HIV T-cell epitopes identified by the Ragon Institute, with funding from the Bill & Melinda Gates Foundation. ReiThera will handle vector engineering, process development, and GMP manufacturing, while the Ragon Institute will lead preclinical development. IAVI will sponsor and conduct a Phase 1 clinical trial to assess the vaccine's safety and immunogenicity.

On August 2024, Terry Ragon announced that he is funding HIV cure research through his Ragon Institute and donated around $400 million to the cause. Ragon has referred to this initiative as a "Manhattan Project on HIV," with clinical trials for a therapeutic vaccine scheduled for 2025.

In November 2024, the Ragon Institute together with Tecnológico de Monterrey signed an agreement to collaborate on doctoral studies, research programs, academic exchanges, and joint research projects to bring advanced immune system research to Latin America.

On January 29, 2025, researchers at the Ragon Institute and MIT's Jameel Clinic developed MUNIS, a deep-learning model that improves T cell epitope prediction. This model has the potential to accelerate vaccine development for infectious diseases. The findings were published in Nature Machine Intelligence.

== Facilities ==
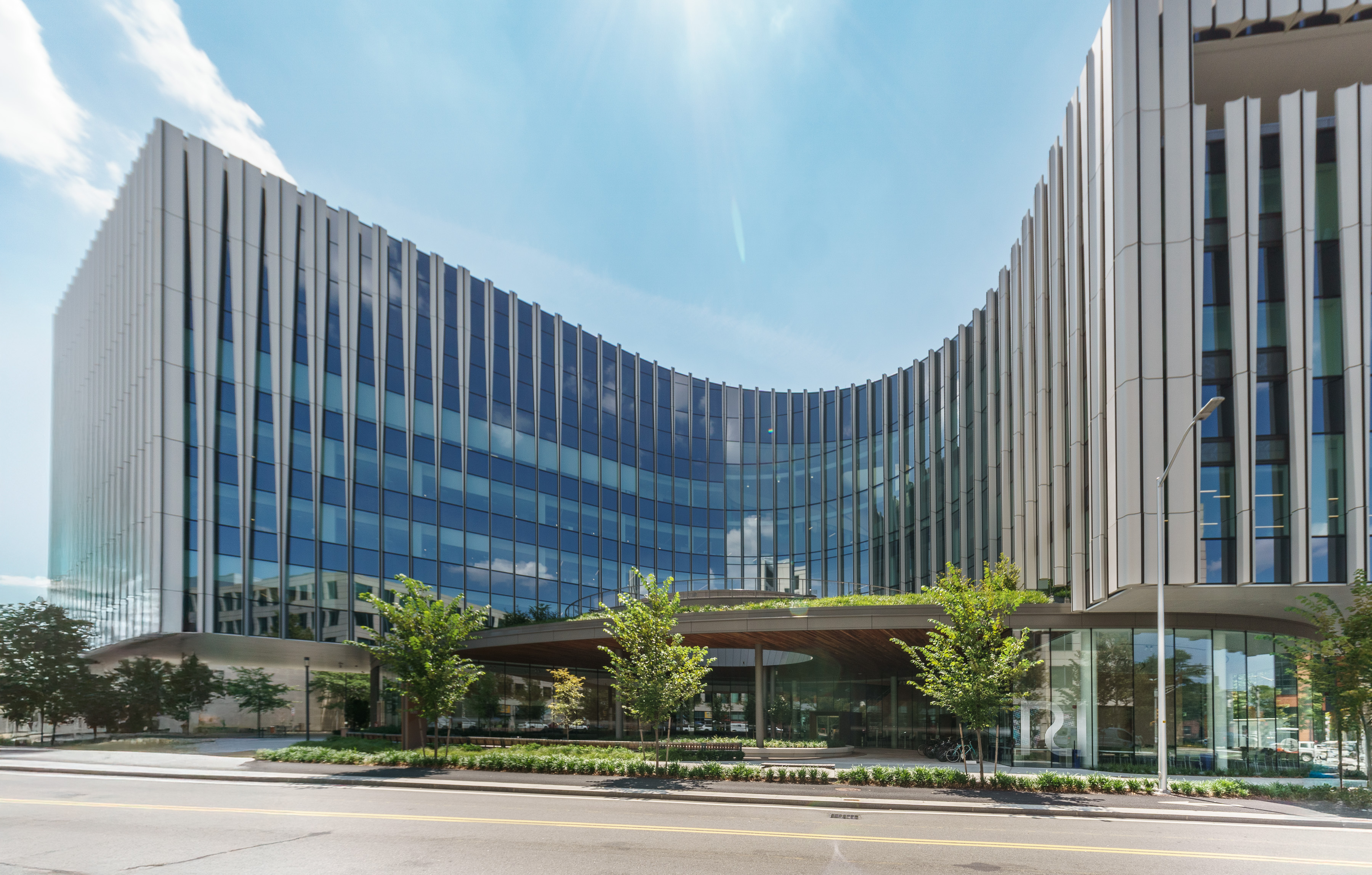
600 Main Street

=== 400 Technology Square ===
Researchers, staff, and collaborators occupy approximately 74,675 sq ft of the facility at 400 Technology Square, Cambridge, Massachusetts, consisting of floors 7–10, half the 1st floor, and 3,000 sq ft on the basement level. The building also features a Biosafety Level 3 (BL3) lab, which will provide scientists in the community access to a dedicated 12-color high-speed cell sorter and microscopy. The first floor has a 160-seat auditorium with audio-visual and conferencing capabilities which is used for weekly seminars as well as community events.

=== 600 Main Street ===
On June 24, 2024, the Ragon Institute celebrated its 15th anniversary and opened a 300,000-square-foot building in Cambridge, on Kendall Square at 600 Main St. and includes a lab and workspace and is Leed Gold certified by the U.S. Green Building Council.

== Operations ==
The Ragon Institute operates on harnessing the immune system to prevent and cure human disease through interdisciplinary collaboration. Scientists from immunology, genetics, infectious diseases, and computational biology work together to advance global health initiatives.

The Institute is structured around three core research programs:

1. Program for Immunophysiology and Disease: This program investigates immune system complexities to prepare for global health threats. It focuses on understanding immune homeostasis, strengthening immune responses against pathogens, and addressing immune dysfunctions.
2. Program for Patient-Focused Immunology: By bridging clinical observations and laboratory research, this program develops patient-centered therapies. It includes testing therapeutic interventions through clinical trials, conducting translational studies to develop novel treatments, and addressing health equity through social and behavioral research.
3. Program for Immune Engineering: This program leverages scientific discoveries to develop innovative diagnostics and therapies, including the creation of immune-based vaccines, the development of disease detection tools, and the exploration of non-vaccine immune therapies.

The Ragon Institute has 24 research labs led by prominent principal investigators. These labs focus on various areas of immunology and infectious diseases, including HIV, cancer, malaria, tuberculosis, COVID-19, autoimmune diseases, and emerging viruses like Zika and Ebola. Researchers at the Institute work on topics such as immune response mechanisms, vaccine development, host-pathogen interactions, immune therapy, and clinical trials, collaborating across disciplines to advance global health initiatives. Each lab brings expertise in molecular biology, immunogenetics, and clinical research.

The Ragon Institute has 12 labs dedicated to various research sectors where PhD fellows lead and publish studies. The Institute fosters a collaborative environment that brings together experts from engineering, medicine, and various research disciplines.

== International activity ==
=== FRESH Program ===
Launched in 2012, the Females Rising through Education, Support, and Health (FRESH) program operates in KwaZulu-Natal, South Africa, where young women face a high risk of contracting HIV. FRESH integrates scientific research with life-skills and job training, aiming to understand early immune responses to HIV and empower young women by providing access to HIV prevention medications (PrEP) and development resources.

=== Baby U! Program ===
In 2022, Ragon International expanded its efforts with the Baby U! program, addressing the challenge of preterm birth (PTB) in South Africa, where the PTB rate is notably high. This program recruits pregnant women in Umlazi Township to study the immune correlates of PTB, aiming to develop early biomarkers for predicting and preventing preterm births. Alongside research, Baby U! offers prenatal care and addresses broader maternal and neonatal health disparities.

=== ITEACH program ===
The ITEACH program, established in 2005 at Edendale Hospital in KwaZulu-Natal, South Africa, focuses on improving access to HIV and TB treatment and prevention. It partners with local health providers, traditional Zulu healers, and community stakeholders to reduce the impact of these diseases. ITEACH trains traditional healers to integrate modern HIV and TB prevention methods, reaching patients who may not seek conventional care. The program also supports healthcare efforts by deploying Treatment Warriors and playing a key role in COVID-19 education.

=== Connect Africa Scholarship ===
The Connect Africa Scholarship supports early-career African scientists by offering travel and skills-building opportunities. This program helps researchers enhance their expertise and contribute to global health technologies, while promoting sustainable scientific leadership in under-resourced regions.

=== International partners ===
The Ragon Institute advances global health by partnering with institutions worldwide, particularly in regions heavily impacted by HIV, TB, and other infectious diseases. Key collaborations in South Africa include support for the Africa Health Research Institute (AHRI), HIV Pathogenesis Programme (HPP), and the KwaZulu-Natal Research Institute for TB and HIV (K-RITH), where the Ragon Institute plays a pivotal role in research and training. These partnerships aim to address health crises and build local scientific capacity, exemplified by initiatives like the Connect Africa Scholarship, fostering the next generation of African scientists. The Ragon Institute's international collaborations began with Dr. Bruce Walker's early work in KwaZulu-Natal.
