= James J. Collins =

American bioengineer and biophysicist (born 1965)

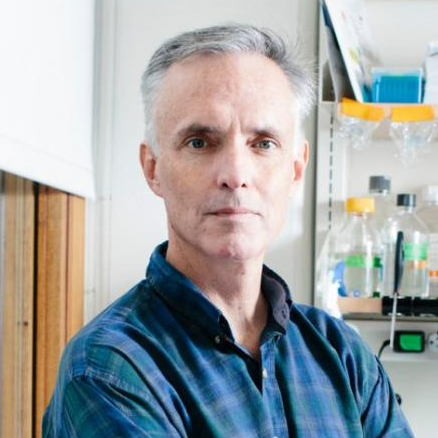
- Collins in 2021
- Born: June 26, 1965 (age 61); New York City, U.S.
- Education: College of the Holy Cross (BA); University of Oxford (DPhil)
- Known for: Pioneering synthetic biology Discovery of halicin and abaucin
- Spouse: Mary McNaughton Collins (m. 1990)
- Awards: MacArthur Fellowship (2003); NIH Director's Pioneer Award (2007); Lagrange Prize (2010); HFSP Nakasone Award (2015); Dickson Prize in Medicine (2020); Max Delbruck Prize (2020); Marvin J. Johnson Award (2021); Feynman Prize (2023); Clarivate Citation Laureate (2023); IET Achievement Medal (2023); IEEE Medal for Innovations in Healthcare Technology (2025)
- Scientific career
- Fields: Biological engineering Biomedical engineering Systems biology Biophysics
- Workplaces: Massachusetts Institute of Technology; Harvard University
- Thesis: Joint Mechanics: Modeling of the Lower Limb (1990)
- Doctoral advisor: John J. O'Connor

James Joseph Collins (born June 26, 1965) is an American bioengineer and biophysicist who is one of the founders of synthetic biology. He is known for pioneering synthetic gene networks and programmable cells, which launched the field of synthetic biology and influenced research in the detection and treatment of Ebola, Zika, and COVID-19. He pioneered the use of artificial intelligence in antibiotic discovery, identifying novel antibiotics effective against drug-resistant bacterial pathogens. He is also known for pioneering stochastic resonance, neurostimulation, and biological dynamics in the research of physiological and biological systems. He is the Termeer Professor of Medical Engineering & Science at the Massachusetts Institute of Technology (MIT).

After graduating from the College of the Holy Cross, Collins earned his doctorate in medical engineering from the University of Oxford in 1990 as a Rhodes Scholar. He was a professor of biomedical engineering, a professor of medicine, University Professor, and the William Fairfield Warren Distinguished Professor at Boston University, where he co-founded the Center for BioDynamics before moving to MIT in 2014. He is currently a director of the MIT Jameel Clinic, a member of the Harvard–MIT Program in Health Sciences and Technology and the Broad Institute, and a core faculty member of the Wyss Institute at Harvard University and IMES.

Collins is an elected member of the National Academy of Medicine, the National Academy of Engineering, and the National Academy of Sciences. He was awarded a MacArthur Fellowship in 2003 for biotechnology research, the Lagrange Prize in 2010 for outstanding contributions to complexity science, and the Dickson Prize in Medicine in 2020 for pioneering synthetic biology. He received the Feynman Prize in Nanotechnology in 2023 and was named a Clarivate Citation Laureate in Chemistry that same year for pioneering synthetic gene circuits.

== Early life and education ==
Collins was born on June 26, 1965, in the Bronx, then moved to Bellerose, New York. His father was an aviation engineer employed in NASA and military projects, and partly developed the optical system for the Apollo Lunar Module. His mother was a mathematician. His paternal grandfather, Maurice Collins, and his paternal grandmother, Helen Kiely, were both Irish natives who were raised in Abbeyfeale, County Limerick, and Kiskeam, County Cork, respectively. At age 10, Collins moved to New Hampshire with his family after finishing elementary school, growing up in Nashua. He first developed an interest in medical engineering when one of his grandfathers became blind and the other suffered multiple strokes.

After high school, Collins initially intended to study electrical engineering in college. He was admitted to the Massachusetts Institute of Technology (MIT), but chose instead to enroll at the College of the Holy Cross in Worcester, Massachusetts, for the college's community. As an undergraduate at Holy Cross, he was a member of its track and cross country teams, and ran a 4:17 mile. He worked as a cartoonist for the school newspaper, The Crusader, in addition to being a class officer and editor of a science literary magazine. He also won a President's Volunteer Service Award and, in 1986, was named the Fenwick Scholar, the college's highest academic honor. He graduated from Holy Cross with a Bachelor of Arts, summa cum laude, in physics as valedictorian in 1987. As the Fenwick Scholar, he was granted exemption from classes to pursue research as a senior and completed a thesis titled, "Functional Neuromuscular Stimulation: An Analysis of the Biomechanical and Neuromuscular Foundations of Walking".

After graduating from Holy Cross, Collins was awarded a Rhodes Scholarship to study in England at the University of Oxford. As a Rhodes Scholar, he earned his Doctor of Philosophy (D.Phil.) in medical engineering from Balliol College, Oxford, in 1990. His doctoral dissertation, completed under John J. O'Connor at the Department of Engineering Science, was titled, "Joint Mechanics: Modelling of the Lower Limb". While pursuing his doctorate, he played as a member of the Oxford University Men's Basketball team and earned an Oxford Blue. In 1989, while still a doctoral student, Collins began a collaboration with mathematician Ian Stewart, with whom he published a series of papers on animal locomotion during the 1990s.

== Academic career ==
=== Boston University (1990–2014) ===
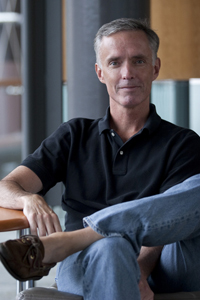
Collins in 2009

After receiving his doctorate, Collins joined the faculty of Boston University (BU) in 1990. One of his early research focuses included kinesiology; he developed a series of devices to improve locomotion, neural function, and cardiac function, including vibrating insoles. He was appointed a professor of biomedical engineering at the Boston University College of Engineering, where he co-founded the Center for BioDynamics in 1997 and served as its director, and earned multiple recognitions for teaching, including being named the college's "Biomedical Engineering Teacher of the Year" and the university's "Professor of the Year". He won the university's Metcalf Cup and Prize for Excellence in Teaching in 2000, the university's highest teaching honor. While at BU, he simultaneously taught at Harvard Medical School from 1998 to 2010.

In 1999, Collins, along with his biomedical engineering student Timothy Gardner, executed one of the first attempts to engineer genomes to perform certain functions. Together, they edited the genes of E. coli bacteria to create or stop creating certain proteins. Their findings of a genetic on/off, or "toggle switch," were published in Nature in an article now considered seminal in the field of synthetic biology. In October 2003, he became the first bioengineer to be awarded a MacArthur Fellowship, which he received for "identifying abstract principles underlying complex biological phenomena such as motor control during standing and walking". That same year, he was the director of the Applied Biodynamics Laboratory at BU. In 2008, he was named a principal investigator of the Howard Hughes Medical Institute—the first from Boston University—to pursue research in gene expression and antibiotic resistance in single cells. On May 18, 2009, he was appointed as one of BU’s two inaugural William F. Warren Distinguished Professors, alongside George Annas. In 2010, he was appointed by President Barack Obama to the Presidential Commission for the Study of Bioethical Issues.

By 2011, Collins held five appointments at Boston University: William F. Warren Distinguished Professor, University Professor, Professor of Biomedical Engineering, Professor of Medicine, and co-director of the Center for BioDynamics. That same year, he became the third BU professor to be elected to the National Academy of Engineering; by that time, his research focused on the invention of synthetic gene networks and the development of techniques to improve biological function and devices to treat brain failure and other diseases, such as Parkinson's disease.

Collins Lab
- Website: www.collinslab.mit.edu

=== Massachusetts Institute of Technology (2014–present) ===
Antibiotics-AI Project
- Website: www.collinslab.mit.edu/antibiotics-ai-project

In December 2014, Collins moved to the Massachusetts Institute of Technology (MIT), where he was appointed the Termeer Professor of Medical Engineering & Science and was additionally named a professor at the Institute for Medical Engineering and Science. Since then, he has been a joint professor in the MIT Department of Biological Engineering and a faculty member of the Biophysics Program, the Synthetic Biology Center, Microbiology Graduate Program, Computational & Systems Biology Initiative, and Center for Microbiome Informatics & Therapeutics, all at MIT. He has also been a visiting professor of engineering science at the University of Oxford since 2023.

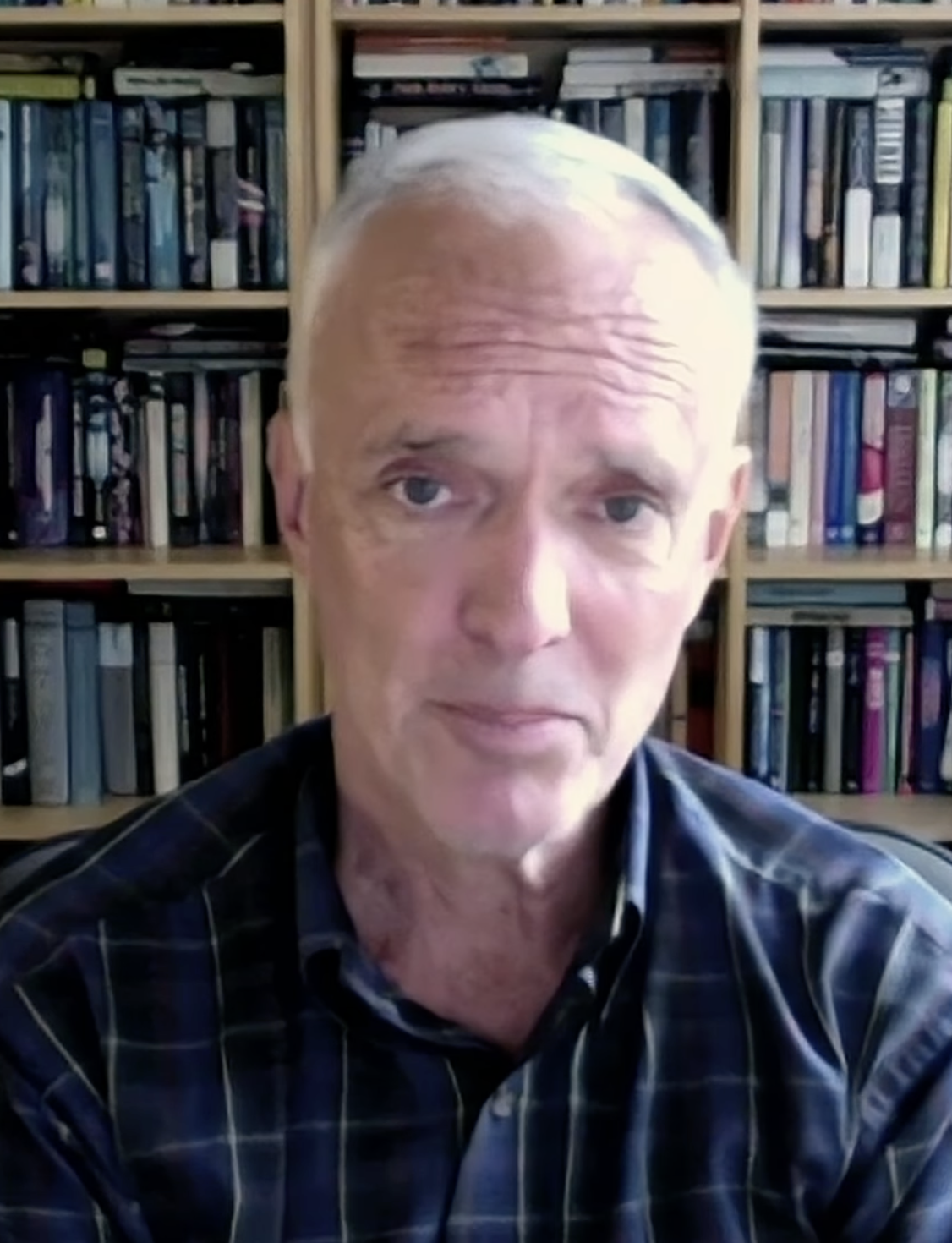
Collins in 2025

In 2016, Collins was appointed Allen Distinguished Investigator by the Allen Institute to research potential synthetic biology applications to antimicrobial resistance in drug-resistant bacteria. On October 3, 2018, he was named by Anantha Chandrakasan, the dean of the MIT School of Engineering, as faculty lead of the MIT Abdul Latif Jameel Clinic for Machine Learning in Health, alongside Regina Barzilay. In addition to the MIT Jameel Clinic, he leads the Antibiotics-AI Project at MIT, a research initiative which uses deep learning to discover new antibiotics. In 2024, he became a member of the Koch Institute for Integrative Cancer Research. He is currently a member of the editorial board of the scientific journals Science, Cell, and the Proceedings of the National Academy of Sciences.

Collins has been involved with a number of start-up companies, and his inventions and technologies have been licensed by over 25 biotech and medical device companies. He is the co-founder of the biomedical companies Senti Biosciences, Sherlock Biosciences, and Cellarity.

=== Harvard University ===
Collins has been a visiting professor of systems biology at Harvard Medical School since 2008. That same year, he became a founding Core Faculty Member of the Wyss Institute for Biologically Inspired Engineering, where he currently is lead of Living Cellular Devices. He has also been a member and senior associate of the Broad Institute of Harvard and MIT and a professor of the Harvard–MIT Program in Health Sciences and Technology since 2014.

== Research ==
=== Synthetic biology ===
External videos
- How we're using AI to discover new antibiotics, TedX (2020)
- James Collins: Doing Good Science with an Underdog Spirit, Harvard Biotech (2026)

Collins' work on synthetic gene circuits launched the field of synthetic biology. He was the first (along with Michael Elowitz and Stanislas Leibler) to show that one can harness the biophysical properties of nucleic acids and proteins to create biological circuits, which can be used to rewire and reprogram living cells.

In a paper published in Nature, Collins designed and constructed a genetic toggle switch – a synthetic, bistable gene regulatory network – in E. coli. The toggle switch forms a synthetic, addressable cellular memory unit with broad implications for biophysics, biomedicine and biotechnology. In the same issue of Nature, Elowitz and Leibler showed that one can build a synthetic genetic oscillator (called the repressilator) in E. coli. Collins’ Nature paper on the genetic toggle switch and Elowitz's and Leibler's Nature paper on the repressilator are considered landmark pieces which began the field of synthetic biology.

Building on this work, Collins showed that synthetic gene networks can be used as regulatory modules and interfaced with a microbe's genetic circuitry to create programmable cells for a variety applications, e.g., synthetic probiotics to serve as living diagnostics and living therapeutics to detect, treat and prevent infections such as cholera and C. difficile. He also designed and constructed engineered riboregulators (RNA switches) for sensing and control, microbial kill switches and genetic counters for biocontainment, synthetic bacteriophage to combat resistant bacterial infections, genetic switchboards for metabolic engineering, and tunable genetic switches for gene and cell therapy. Recently, Collins developed freeze-dried, cell-free synthetic gene circuits, an innovative platform that forms the basis for inexpensive, paper-based diagnostic tests for emerging pathogens (e.g., Zika, Ebola, SARS-CoV-2, antibiotic-resistant bacteria), wearable biosensors, and portable biomolecular manufacturing (e.g., to produce vaccine antigens) in the developing world.

In the context of synthetic biology and regenerative medicine, Collins collaborated with Derrick Rossi and George Q. Daley on a study using synthetic mRNA technology for biomedical applications. The team showed that synthetic mRNA could be used for highly efficient stem cell reprogramming and redifferentiation. This work was published in Cell Stem Cell in 2010, and Rossi used this synthetic biology technology platform to found Moderna.

Collins has also used synthetic biology approaches (computational and experimental) to identify and address significant biological physics questions regarding the regulation of gene expression and cell dynamics. Collins, for example, has utilized synthetic gene networks to study the effects of positive feedback in genetic modules, the role and origin of stochastic fluctuations in eukaryotic gene expression, and the phenotypic consequences of gene expression noise and its effects on cell fate and microbial survival strategies in stressful environments. Importantly, Collins has also demonstrated how synthetic gene circuits can be used to test, validate and improve qualitative and quantitative models of gene regulation, and shown that biophysical theory and experiment can be coupled in bottom-up approaches to gain biological insights into the intricate processes of gene regulation.

=== Antibiotics and antibiotic resistance ===
Collins is also one of the leading researchers in systems biology through the use of experimental-computational biophysical techniques to reverse engineer and analyze endogenous gene regulatory networks. Collins and collaborators showed that reverse-engineered gene networks can be used to identify drug targets, biological mediators and disease biomarkers.

Collins and collaborators discovered, using systems biology approaches, that all classes of bactericidal antibiotics induce a common oxidative damage cellular death pathway. This finding indicates that targeting bacterials systems that remediate oxidative damage, including the SOS DNA damage response, is a viable means of enhancing the effectiveness of all major classes of antibiotics and limiting the emergence of antibiotic resistance. This work established a mechanistic relationship between bacterial metabolism and antibiotic efficacy, which was further developed and validated by Collins and his team in a series of follow-on studies.

Collins showed that certain metabolites could be used to enable bactericidal antibiotics to eradicate persistent, tolerant infections. Additionally, Collins and co-workers discovered that sublethal levels of antibiotics activate mutagenesis by stimulating the production of reactive oxygen species, leading to multidrug resistance. Collins and colleagues, using their systems approaches, also discovered a population-based resistance mechanism constituting a form of kin selection whereby a small number of resistant bacterial mutants, in the face of antibiotic stress, can, at some cost to themselves, provide protection to other more vulnerable, cells, enhancing the survival capacity of the overall population in stressful environments.

In 2020, Collins was part of the team—with fellow MIT Jameel Clinic faculty lead Professor Regina Barzilay—that announced the discovery through deep learning of halicin, the first new antibiotic compound for 30 years, which kills over 35 powerful bacteria, including antimicrobial-resistant tuberculosis, the superbug C. difficile, and two of the World Health Organization's top-three most deadly bacteria. In 2020, Collins, Barzilay and the MIT Jameel Clinic were also awarded funding through The Audacious Project to create the Antibiotics-AI Project and expand on the discovery of halicin in using AI to respond to the antibiotic resistance crisis through the development of new classes of antibiotics.

=== Nonlinear dynamics in biological systems ===
Collins also pioneered the development and use of nonlinear dynamical approaches to study, mimic and improve biological function, expanding our ability to understand and harness the physics of living systems. Collins, for example, proposed that input noise could be used to enhance sensory function and motor control in humans. He and collaborators showed that touch sensation and balance control in young and older adults, patients with stroke, and patients with diabetic neuropathy could be improved with the application of sub-sensory mechanical noise, e.g., via vibrating insoles. This work has led to the creation of a new class of medical devices to address complications resulting from diabetic neuropathy, restore brain function following stroke, and improve elderly balance.

== Awards and honors ==
Collins' scientific accomplishments have been recognized by numerous awards. In addition to receiving a MacArthur "Genius" Fellowship in 2003, he was named one of the top 50 science and technology leaders of 2005 by Scientific American, for "Designing Artificial Life". He had also been named as one of 100 young innovators shaping the future of technology in the Innovators Under 35 by MIT Technology Review in 1999. In 2007, he was awarded the National Institutes of Health Director's Pioneer Award for his project "A Network Biology Approach to Antibiotic Action and Bacterial Defense Mechanisms", for which he received $25 million in funding over five years. That same year, he was named a Senior Scholar Awardee in Aging Research by the Ellison Medical Foundation. In 2010, he won the Lagrange-CRT Foundation Prize, given by the Institute for Scientific Interchange, for "outstanding contributions relevant to the progress of complexity science".

Collins is an elected member of all three U.S. national academies. In 1999, he was elected a fellow of the American Physical Society in biological physics. In 2000, he was elected a fellow of the American Institute for Medical and Biological Engineering. In 2002, he was elected a fellow of the Institute of Physics in the United Kingdom. In 2011, he was elected a member of the National Academy of Engineering for his contributions to synthetic biology and genetic engineering. In 2012, he was elected a member of the American Academy of Arts and Sciences in the area of Mathematical and Physical Sciences. Collins was formally inducted into the academy on October 6, 2012. On October 15, 2012, he was elected to the National Academy of Medicine. In 2014, he was elected to the National Academy of Sciences, in the areas of Engineering Sciences, Biophysics, and Computational Biology. On November 25, 2013, he was elected a fellow of the American Association for the Advancement of Science in the field of Engineering.

On November 13, 2012, Collins, together with Peter Palese, Jeffrey Ravetch, and John Mekalanos, received the Sanofi-Institut Pasteur Award in Paris, France, for "reducing antibiotic resistance and establishing innovative new treatments for bacterial infections". In September 2014, he was awarded the Human Frontier Science Program (HFSP)'s Nakasone Award for innovating synthetic gene networks and programmable cells. He received the Robert A. Pritzker Distinguished Lecture Award that same year. On October 18, 2017, he was awarded the Jacob and Louise Gabbay Award in Biotechnology and Medicine at Brandeis University "for his inventive work in synthetic biology that created a new area of research, enabling multiple biomedical applications and launching a new sector of the biotechnology industry".

Collins won the 2020 Max Delbruck Prize in Biological Physics, conferred by the American Physical Society, for "pioneering contributions at the interface of physics and biology, in particular the establishment of the field of synthetic biology and applications of statistical physics and nonlinear dynamics in biology and medicine". That same year, he was awarded the Dickson Prize in Medicine, the highest honor of the University of Pittsburgh School of Medicine, for pioneering synthetic biology. In 2021, he was awarded the Marvin J. Johnson Award in Microbial and Biochemical Technology. He was also awarded the 2021 Sigma Xi Walston Chubb Award for Innovation, which honors scientific and engineering creativity. In 2023, Collins was named a Clarivate Citation Laureate along with Michael Elowitz and Stanislas Leibler "for pioneering work on synthetic gene circuits, which launched the field of synthetic biology", and was awarded the Feynman Prize in Nanotechnology for his same work on gene circuits. He received the IET Achievement Medal that same year.

In 2025, Collins was awarded the IEEE Medal for Innovations in Healthcare Technology for "contributions to synthetic gene circuits and programmable cells, launching the field of synthetic biology, impacting healthcare applications". In 2026, he was awarded the Tel Aviv University International Prize in Biophysics for "pioneering contributions to quantitative and synthetic biophysics".

== Personal life ==
Collins married Mary McNaughton, a classmate at the College of the Holy Cross, in 1990. She is a professor at Harvard Medical School and a physician at Massachusetts General Hospital. They have two children: Katie, a Marshall Scholar at the University of Cambridge, and Danny, a Knight-Hennessy Scholar at Stanford University.

== Selected publications ==
- Rosenstein, Michael T.; Collins, James J.; De Luca, Carlo J. (May 1993). "A practical method for calculating largest Lyapunov exponents from small data sets". Physica D: Nonlinear Phenomena. 65 (1–2): 117–134. doi:10.1016/0167-2789(93)90009-P.
- Gardner, Timothy S.; Cantor, Charles R.; Collins, James J. (January 2000). "Construction of a genetic toggle switch in Escherichia coli". Nature. 403 (6767): 339–342. doi:10.1038/35002131. ISSN 1476-4687.
- Kohanski, Michael A.; Dwyer, Daniel J.; Hayete, Boris; Lawrence, Carolyn A.; Collins, James J. (September 2007). "A Common Mechanism of Cellular Death Induced by Bactericidal Antibiotics". Cell. 130 (5): 797–810. doi:10.1016/j.cell.2007.06.049.
- Gootenberg, Jonathan S.; Abudayyeh, Omar O.; Lee, Jeong Wook; Essletzbichler, Patrick; Dy, Aaron J.; Joung, Julia; Verdine, Vanessa; Donghia, Nina; Daringer, Nichole M.; Freije, Catherine A.; Myhrvold, Cameron; Bhattacharyya, Roby P.; Livny, Jonathan; Regev, Aviv; Koonin, Eugene V. (April 28, 2017). "Nucleic acid detection with CRISPR-Cas13a/C2c2". Science. 356 (6336): 438–442. doi:10.1126/science.aam9321. ISSN 0036-8075. PMC 5526198. PMID 28408723.
- Warren, Luigi; Manos, Philip D.; Ahfeldt, Tim; Loh, Yuin-Han; Li, Hu; Lau, Frank; Ebina, Wataru; Mandal, Pankaj K.; Smith, Zachary D.; Meissner, Alexander; Daley, George Q.; Brack, Andrew S.; Collins, James J.; Cowan, Chad; Schlaeger, Thorsten M. (November 2010). "Highly Efficient Reprogramming to Pluripotency and Directed Differentiation of Human Cells with Synthetic Modified mRNA". Cell Stem Cell. 7 (5): 618–630. doi:10.1016/j.stem.2010.08.012. ISSN 1934-5909. PMC 3656821. PMID 20888316.
