= MIT Jameel Clinic =

- Established: 2018
- Field of research: Artificial intelligence and health
- Directors: Regina Barzilay; James J. Collins; Dimitris Bertsimas
- Chairs: Dan Huttenlocher; Phil Sharp
- Campus: Massachusetts Institute of Technology
- Affiliations: MIT Schwarzman College of Computing
- Nobel laureates: Phil Sharp
- Website: jclinic.mit.edu

The MIT Abdul Latif Jameel Clinic for Machine Learning in Health (commonly, MIT Jameel Clinic; previously, J-Clinic) is a research center at the Massachusetts Institute of Technology (MIT) in the field of artificial intelligence (AI) and health sciences, including disease detection, drug discovery, and the development of medical devices. The MIT Jameel Clinic also supports the commercialization of solutions through grant funding, and has partnered with pharmaceutical companies, like Takeda and Sanofi, and philanthropies, like Community Jameel and Wellcome Trust, to forge collaborations between research and development functions and MIT researchers.

Co-founded in 2018 by MIT and Community Jameel, the MIT Jameel Clinic is housed in the MIT Schwarzman College of Computing. The mission of the Jameel Clinic is to "revolutionize the prevention, detection, and treatment of disease", and it describes itself as "the epicenter of AI and healthcare at MIT".

The MIT Jameel Clinic is known for using AI for the discovery of the antibiotics halicin and abaucin, and the development of early cancer detection platforms Mirai for breast cancer, and Sybil for lung cancer.

== History ==
On September 17, 2018, the MIT Jameel Clinic was co-founded by MIT and Community Jameel, an organisation of the Jameel family, owners of the Abdul Latif Jameel business. The launch took place at a signing ceremony at MIT with MIT President L. Rafael Reif, and Fady Jameel and Hassan Jameel, then-presidents of Community Jameel. The MIT Jameel Clinic is the fourth major collaboration between MIT and Community Jameel, after the Abdul Latif Jameel Poverty Action Lab, the MIT Abdul Latif Jameel Water and Food Systems Lab, and the MIT Abdul Latif Jameel World Education Lab.

=== MIT-Takeda Program ===
On January 6, 2020, the MIT School of Engineering and Takeda, the pharmaceutical company, announced a new funding program to support research and education in AI and health. The MIT-Takeda Program is housed in the MIT Jameel Clinic. The steering committee for the program is led by Professor Anantha P. Chandrakasan, Dean of the School of Engineering, and Anne Heatherington, senior vice president and head of Data Sciences Institute (DSI) at Takeda.

=== Discovery of halicin ===
On February 19, 2020, the MIT Jameel Clinic's faculty leads for AI and life sciences, Professor Regina Barzilay and Professor Jim Collins, published a paper in Cell confirming the discovery—for the first time by deep learning—of halicin, the first new antibiotic compound for 30 years, which kills over 35 powerful bacteria, including antimicrobial-resistant tuberculosis, the superbug C. difficile, and two of the World Health Organization's top-three most deadly bacteria.

=== AI Cures initiative ===
In 2020, during the COVID-19 pandemic, the MIT Jameel Clinic launched the AI Cures initiative to apply AI techniques to the discovery of effective therapeutics for the disease, and the development of medical devices. The AI Cures initiative is in partnership with the Patrick J. McGovern Foundation, the Defense Advanced Research Projects Agency (DARPA), and the Walter Reed Army Institute of Research (WRAIR).

In September and October 2020, the MIT Jameel Clinic convened two conferences, on data-driven clinical solutions for COVID-19, and on drug discovery.

=== Audacious Project award ===
In June 2020, The Audacious Project (formerly the TED Prize), housed at TED and supported by The Bridgespan Group, selected Professor Collins and an MIT Jameel Clinic team, including Professor Barzilay, for funding. Building on the halicin discovery, the Audacious Project funding will support the MIT Jameel Clinic's response to the antibiotic resistance crisis through the development of new classes of antibiotics to protect patients against some of the world's deadliest bacterial pathogens.

=== Ragon Institute collaboration ===
In July 2021, a gift from Mark Schwartz enabled the MIT Jameel Clinic to partner with the Ragon Institute (a collaboration between Massachusetts General Hospital, Harvard University and MIT) and the MIT Schwarzman College of Computing to create a collaborative initiative for AI and immunology.

=== Jameel Clinic AI Hospital Network ===
With a GBP 3.5m grant from Wellcome Trust, the MIT Jameel Clinic is teaming up with hospitals around the globe to bring AI into mainstream healthcare. To date, the network has extended to 41 hospitals in 13 countries. In providing free access to AI tools, the Jameel Clinic aims to contribute the expertise of its researchers to empower healthcare systems by accelerating the mainstream usage of AI tools on a global scale.

=== Discovery of abaucin ===
On 25 May 2023, the MIT Jameel Clinic's faculty leads for life sciences, Jim Collins, and for AI, Regina Barzilay, and colleagues published a paper in Nature Chemical Biology announcing the deep learning-guided discover of abaucin, an antibiotic targeting Acinetobacter baumannii, one of the WHO's top-three deadliest bacteria in the world.

=== Open-source Boltz model series ===
On 16 November 2024, Boltz-1 was released by MIT Jameel Clinic as the first fully open-source deep learning model to achieve AlphaFold3 accuracy for biomolecular structure prediction. The release of Boltz-1 followed AlphaFold3's publication in Nature without code, which prompted a global race to build the first fully accessible version of AlphaFold3. Boltz-2 was released on 6 June 2025 by MIT Jameel Clinic and Recursion. Boltz-2 improved upon Boltz-1 by being the first model to combine structure and binding affinity prediction. On 25 October 2025, MIT Jameel Clinic released BoltzGen, an all-atom generative AI model for designing protein and peptide binders across diverse modalities and biomolecular targets.

== Faculty and governance ==
=== Leadership ===
The MIT Jameel Clinic leadership comprises three faculty leads:

- Professor Regina Barzilay, faculty lead for AI
- Professor Jim Collins, faculty lead for life sciences
- Professor Dimitris Bertsimas, faculty lead for entrepreneurship

The faculty leads are supported by the Jameel Clinic staff, and coordinate with the Dean of the MIT Schwarzman College of Computing, Daniel P. Huttenlocher.

=== Advisory board ===
The MIT Jameel Clinic is supported by an advisory board, chaired by Institute Professor Emeritus Phil Sharp, winner of the 1993 Nobel Prize in Physiology or Medicine, Institute Professor, former director of the Koch Institute for Integrative Cancer Research and the McGovern Institute for Brain Research, and co-founder of Biogen.

Other members of the advisory board are:

- Michael Chambers, founding CEO of Aldevron
- Ted Chang, CTO, Vice President and General Manager of Quanta Computer
- David Cutler, Otto Eckstein Professor of Applied Economics, Harvard University
- J.C. Gutierrez-Ramos, Senior Vice President and CSO of Danaher Corporation
- Susan Hockfield, president emerita and professor of neuroscience at MIT
- Najat Khan, CEO of Recursion Pharmaceuticals
- Frank Laukien, Chairman, President, and CEO of Bruker Corporation
- Mathai Mammen, head of research and development at Janssen Pharmaceutical Companies
- Ziad Obermeyer, Blue Cross of California Distinguished Associate Professor of Health Policy and Management at UC Berkeley School of Public Health
- Terry Ragon, CEO and owner of InterSystems
- Lecia Sequist, Landry Family Professor of Medicine in the Field of Medical Oncology at Harvard Medical School
- Ravi Thadhani, Executive Vice President, Clinical Affairs, and CMO of Cedars-Sinai Health Systems

Former members of the advisory board include:

- Noubar Afeyan, managing director and CEO of Flagship Pioneering
- Lord Ara Darzi, Paul Hamlyn Chair of Surgery at Imperial College London
- Jay Bradner, Executive Vice President, Research and Development, Artificial Intelligence and Data at Amgen
- Anantha P. Chandrakasan, provost at MIT
- Anne Heatherington, senior vice president and head of the Data Sciences Institute, Takeda
- Kiran Mazumdar-Shaw, chairman and managing director of Biocon
