= Abaucin =

Antibiotic

Identifiers
- IUPAC name: 1'-[2-[4-(trifluoromethyl)phenyl]ethyl]spiro[1H-3,1-benzoxazine-4,4'-piperidine]-2-one
- CAS Number: 300815-41-2 1173022-16-6 (hydrochloride)
- PubChem CID: 10000456
- IUPHAR/BPS: 779
- ChemSpider: 8176037
- ChEBI: CHEBI:93458
- ChEMBL: ChEMBL1593104

Chemical and physical data
- Formula: C_{21}H_{21}F_{3}N_{2}O_{2}
- Molar mass: 390.406 g·mol^{−1}
- 3D model (JSmol): Interactive image
- SMILES: C1CN(CCC12C3=CC=CC=C3NC(=O)O2)CCC4=CC=C(C=C4)C(F)(F)F
- InChI: InChI=1S/C21H21F3N2O2/c22-21(23,24)16-7-5-15(6-8-16)9-12-26-13-10-20(11-14-26)17-3-1-2-4-18(17)25-19(27)28-20/h1-8H,9-14H2,(H,25,27); Key:HIDWEYPGMLIQSN-UHFFFAOYSA-N

Abaucin (RS-102895, MLJS-21001) is a spirocycle containing substituted phenethylamine that has been reported to show useful activity as a narrow-spectrum antibiotic. There is evidence that it is effective against Acinetobacter baumannii, which is one of three bacterial species identified by the World Health Organization as a "critical threat" to humanity. Notably, abaucin was developed with assistance from artificial intelligence by a team led by the MIT Jameel Clinic's faculty lead for life sciences, James J. Collins, and McMaster's Jonathan Stokes. Its mode of action involves inhibiting lipoprotein transport. The compound had previously been reported as an antagonist of the chemokine receptor CCR2, but the molecule's antibiotic activity was not discovered until 2023.

A New York Times opinion piece by Peter Coy for Thanksgiving listed abaucin among scientific discoveries to be thankful for in 2023.

== See also ==
- Halicin
- SCHEMBL19952957
