= David Gruber =

American marine biologist

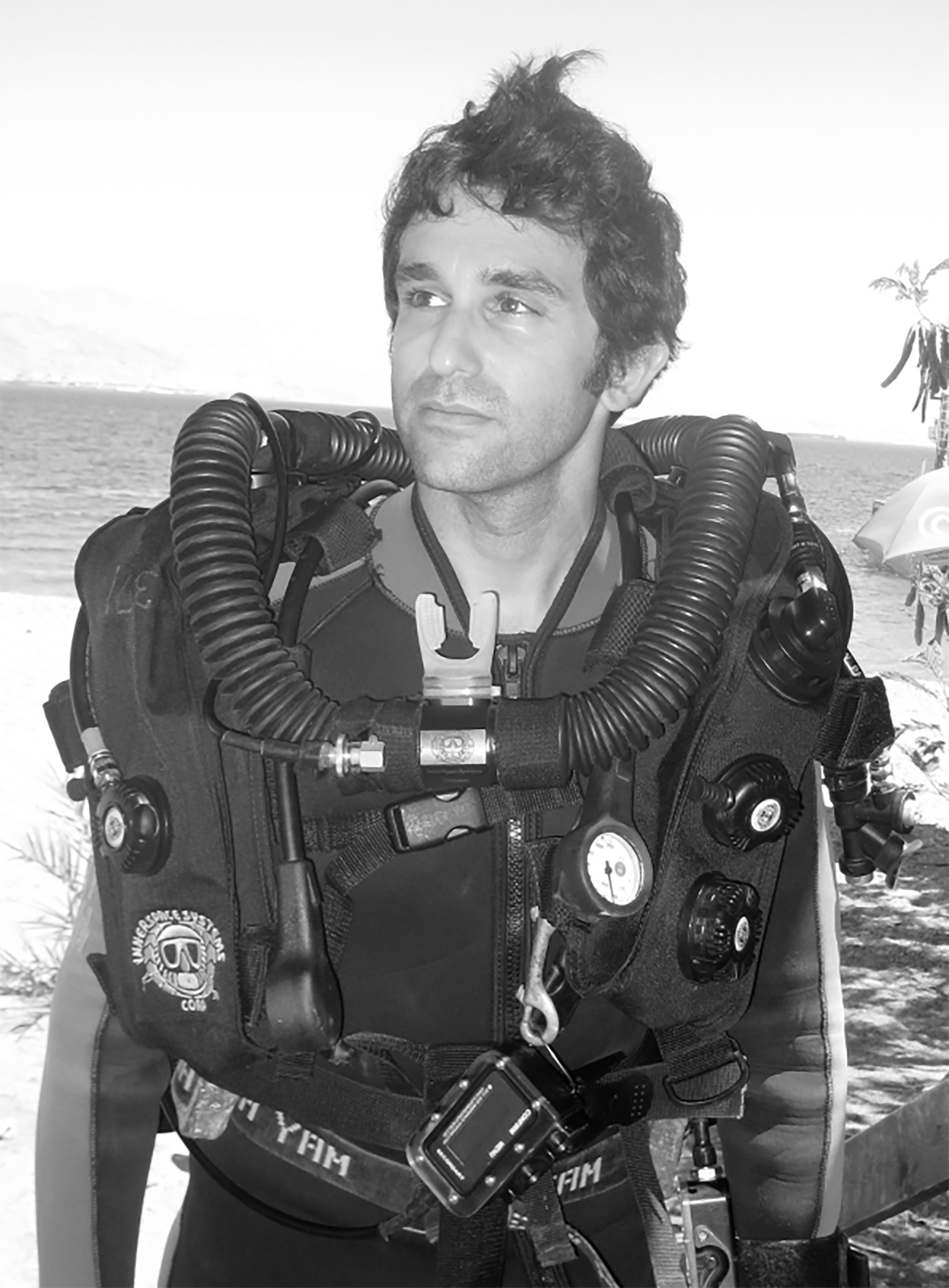
- Born: Paterson, New Jersey, US
- Citizenship: United States
- Education: Rutgers University (PhD); Columbia University (MS); Duke University (MEM); University of Rhode Island (BS)
- Awards: Lagrange Prize
- Scientific career
- Fields: Marine Biology
- Workplaces: Baruch College; Harvard University; American Museum of Natural History

David Gruber is an American marine biologist, a Presidential Professor of Biology and Environmental Sciences at Baruch College, City University of New York, and a National Geographic Explorer. He currently leads Project CETI, an initiative for understanding the communication of sperm whales.

== Early life ==
Gruber was born in Paterson, New Jersey, and received his B.S. at the University of Rhode Island, an M.S. in journalism from Columbia University, a Master of Environmental Management from Duke University and a Ph.D. in Biological Oceanography at Rutgers University Institute for Marine and Coastal Sciences. He completed a post-doctoral position in Molecular Psychiatry at Brown University. David was a 2017–2018 Fellow at the Radcliffe Institute for Advanced Study at Harvard University, and is a current Adjunct Fellow at the John B. Pierce Laboratory, affiliated with the Yale School of Medicine.

== Career ==
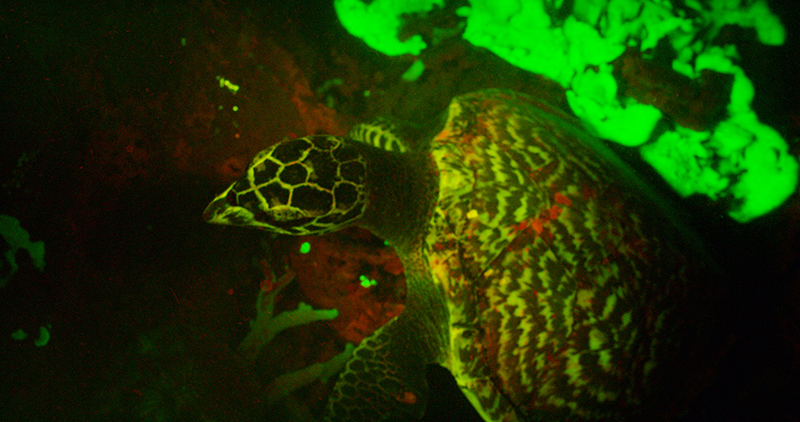
The first observation of biofluorescence in a marine tetrapod

Gruber and collaborators reported discoveries of more than 180 new fluorescent fish species in 2014, as reported in The New York Times's article, "Fluorescence is Widespread in Fish, Study Finds." In 2015, he observed fluorescence in Hawksbill sea turtles in the Solomon Islands, marking the first time that scientists had observed fluorescence in a marine reptile. Field video of this discovery was featured on National Geographic. Also in 2015, Gruber gave a TED Talk on fluorescence in sea creatures at Mission Blue II which has been viewed over 2.3 million times. In 2020, this discovery was listed by National Geographic as a "top 20 scientific discoveries of the decade" for "Seeing animals' unexpected sides."

Gruber and collaborators again had video featured on the National Geographic website in 2016 after engineering a "shark-eye" camera, which for the first time allowed scientists to view sharks as they see each other. From 2017 to 2018, Gruber used his time as a Fellow at the Radcliffe Institute of Advanced Study in order to pursue an in-depth study of jellyfish on topics ranging from their fluorescence, to their connection to humans and how they are effected by climate change. Gruber would use this research into jellyfish in order to act as an educator on a TED-ed animation. In 2018, Gruber promoted marine biology for National Geographic Kids' series "Best Job Ever."

In 2019, Gruber was part of the team responsible for discovering that bromo-tryptophan-kynurenines make sharks fluorescent, and this work was featured in The New York Times, National Geographic, Science Magazine, on PBS and on CNN. That same year, Gruber and team were again featured in an article in National Geographic for their discovery of flashlight fish schooling at night using their bioluminescent organs, which opened up the possibility that schooling fish may inhabit even the deep sea.

=== Delicate exploration/soft robotics ===
Since 2015, Gruber has worked in collaboration with the Harvard MicroRobotics Laboratory in the development of several gentle robotic devices that allow marine researchers to capture and analyze jellyfish and other delicate sea creatures without causing harm. Working with Robert Wood, the director of the MicroRobotics Laboratory, they have developed Squishy Robot Fingers, the Origami Robot, teleoperated soft robotic arms for submarines, and an ultra-gentle robot with soft fingers.

The work of the "Squishy Finger/Soft Robotics for Delicate Deep-sea Marine Biological Interactions Team" was highlighted in the American Museum of Natural History exhibit, Unseen Oceans.

=== Project CETI and sperm whale communication ===
Gruber led the first study to apply advanced deep machine learning techniques to better detect and classify Sperm Whale bioacoustics. Gruber currently leads Project CETI, an Audacious project to understand sperm whale communication.

=== Awards and honors ===
- 2019 Recipient of Lagrange Prize (Italy)
- 2016 Keynote speaker at Explorers Club Annual Dinner
- 2014 Fellow, Explorers Club
- 2014 Emerging Explorer, National Geographic Society
- 2006 Best American Science Writing for Manifold Destiny article in The New Yorker

=== Art collaborations ===
- Joan Jonas – "Moving off the Land II" at Ocean Space, Chiesa di San Lorenzo, Venice, Italy
- Janaina Tschäpe – "Fictionary of Corals and Jellies" commissioned by Thyssen-Bornemisza Art Contemporary-Academy

== Books ==
- Pieribone, Vincent & Gruber, David F. (2006). Aglow in the Dark: Revolutionary Science of Biofluorescence. The Belknap Press of Harvard University Press. ISBN 0-674-01921-0.
