= N-acetylglucosamine deacetylase =

Class of enzymes

Identifiers
- EC no.: 3.5.1.33
- CAS no.: 9012-32-2

Databases
- BRENDA: enzyme data
- ExPASy: NiceZyme view
- KEGG: enzyme entry
- MetaCyc: metabolic pathway
- Rhea: reactions
- PDB structures: RCSB PDB PDBe PDBsum
- Gene Ontology: AmiGO / QuickGO
Search
- PMC: articles
- PubMed: articles
- NCBI: proteins

N-acetylglucosamine deacetylase (EC 3.5.1.33) is an enzyme that catalyzes the chemical reaction

N-acetylglucosamine
H_{2}O
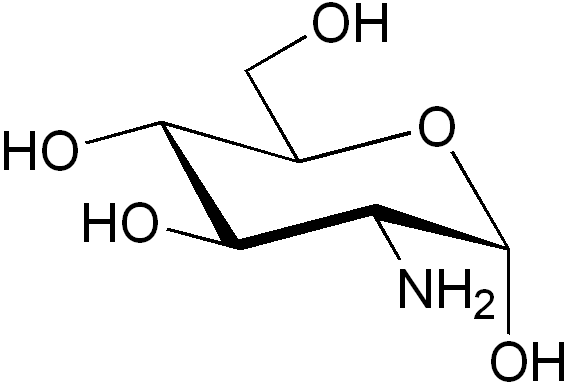
glucosamine
+
acetic acid

The enzyme characterised from Escherichia coli hydrolyses N-acetylglucosamine to glucosamine and acetic acid. It has also been found in Acinetobacter baumannii. The enzyme has been studied as a means of manufacturing glucosamine.

This enzyme belongs is a hydrolase, one acting on carbon-nitrogen bonds other than peptide bonds, specifically in linear amides. The systematic name of this enzyme class is N-acetyl-D-glucosamine amidohydrolase. Other names in use include acetylaminodeoxyglucose acetylhydrolase, and N-acetyl-D-glucosaminyl N-deacetylase.

== Structural studies ==
As of late 2007, two structures have been solved for this class of enzymes, with PDB accession codes PDB: 2C1G and PDB: 2C1I.
