= Roy Kishony =

Biomedical research scientist

Roy Kishony is a biophysicist and systems biologist working on antibiotic resistance, microbial evolution, and computational biology. He currently serves as the Marilyn and Henry Taub Professor of Life Sciences at the Technion – Israel Institute of Technology, holding joint appointments in the Faculty of Biology (major), Faculty of Biomedicine, and the Faculty of Computer Science. Dr. Kishony is also a Visiting Scientist at the Broad Institute Center for Integrated Solutions for Infectious Diseases.

== Early life and education ==
Born in Israel, Kishony completed his B.A. in Physics and Mathematics at the Hebrew University of Jerusalem in 1992. He earned his Ph.D. in Physics from Tel Aviv University in 1999. Transitioning into biology, he conducted postdoctoral research at Princeton University and The Rockefeller University with Stanislas Leibler, focusing on microbial systems and evolutionary dynamics.

== Academic career ==
In 2003, Kishony established his independent laboratory at Harvard University, first as a Bauer Fellow and later in the newly formed Department of Systems Biology at Harvard Medical School, where he was promoted to full professor in 2011. In 2014, he returned to Israel to join the Technion, where he also served as the director of the Lorry I. Lokey Interdisciplinary Center for Life Sciences and Engineering.

== Research contributions ==
Kishony's research integrates experimental biology, mathematical modeling, and ML/AI big-data analytics to study microbial evolution, particularly antibiotic resistance.

- Drug combinations can suppress or even reverse antibiotic resistance, and explaining the principles of selection inversion.
- Developing the MEGA-plate experiment, a large-scale visualization of bacterial evolution and natural selection under antibiotic stress.
- AI-based algorithms for personalized antibiotic prescriptions, aiding clinicians in selecting effective treatments for infections like urinary tract infections.
- Quantified the community level impact of COVID-19 vaccination.
- An "AI scientist" capable of performing autonomous research from data alone to complete human-verifiable research papers. See Data-to-Paper.

== Honors ==
- 2022 Rappaport Prize for an Established Researcher
- 2021 Landau Award in Bioinformatics
- 2016 Michael Bruno Memorial Award
- 2013 Sanofi – Institut Pasteur Award
- 2009 Outstanding Achievement in Biomedical Science Award, Genzyme
