= Regina Barzilay =

Israeli-American computer scientist

- רגינה ברזילי
- Born: 1970 (age 55–56); Chișinău, Moldova
- Education: Ben-Gurion University of the Negev (BSc, MSc); Columbia University (PhD)
- Awards: Pritzker Prize for AI in Science Research Excellence (2026); TIME100 AI (2025); IEEE Frances E. Allen Medal (2025); AAAI Squirrel AI Award for Artificial Intelligence for the Benefit of Humanity (2021); AAAI Fellow (2018); National Science Foundation CAREER Award (2005); TR35; MacArthur Fellowship (2017)
- Scientific career
- Fields: Computer science Natural language processing
- Workplaces: Massachusetts Institute of Technology; Weizmann Institute of Science
- Thesis: Information Fusion for Multidocument. Summarization: Paraphrasing and Generation (2003)
- Doctoral advisor: Kathleen McKeown
- Website: people.csail.mit.edu/regina/

Regina Barzilay (Hebrew: רגינה ברזילי; born 1970) is an Israeli-American computer scientist. She is a School of Engineering Distinguished Professor of AI & Health at the Massachusetts Institute of Technology (MIT) and a faculty lead for artificial intelligence at the MIT Jameel Clinic. Her current research interests are in applications of deep learning to chemistry and oncology. Previously, her research was focused on natural language processing.

== Early life and education ==
Barzilay was born in Chișinău, Moldova, and emigrated to Israel with her parents at the age of 20. She received bachelor's and master's degrees from Ben-Gurion University of the Negev in 1993 and 1998, respectively. She obtained a PhD in computer science from Columbia University in 2003 for research supervised by Kathleen McKeown.

== Career and research ==
After her PhD, she spent a year as a postdoctoral researcher at Cornell University. She joined MIT faculty in 2003 and was appointed as Delta Electronics Professor of Electrical Engineering and Computer Science at MIT in 2016. She was diagnosed with breast cancer in 2014, which prompted her to conduct research in oncology. Barzilay won the MacArthur Fellowship in 2017.

For her doctoral dissertation at Columbia University, she led the development of Newsblaster, which recognized stories from different news sources as being about the same basic subject, and then paraphrased elements from the stories to create a summary.

In computational linguistics, Barzilay created algorithms that learned annotations from common languages (i.e. English) to analyze less understood languages.

Prompted by her experience with breast cancer, Barzilay is applying machine learning to oncology. She is collaborating with physicians and students to devise deep learning models that utilize images, text, and structured data to identify trends that affect early diagnosis, treatment, and disease prevention.

Frontline Documentary

Following her battle with breast cancer in 2014, and her researching into applying artificial intelligence to improve early detection methods, she collaborated with Dr. Connie Lehman at Massachusetts General Hospital. Together with her then-student Adam Yala , Barzilay developed an AI-based system called Mirai, which capable of predicting the likelihood of breast cancer up to five years in advance. The system leverages deep learning techniques to analyze mammograms and diagnostic notes, surpassing traditional pattern recognition by human radiologists. This breakthrough, while still in development, has the potential to significantly enhance early diagnosis and treatment outcomes.

Barzilay's work in this area was featured in the FRONTLINE documentary In the Age of AI, which explores the broader impact of artificial intelligence on society.

=== MIT Jameel Clinic ===
In 2018, Barzilay was appointed faculty lead for AI at the new MIT Jameel Clinic, a research center in the field of AI health sciences, including disease detection, drug discovery, and the development of medical devices. In 2020, she was part of the team—with fellow MIT Jameel Clinic faculty lead Professor James J. Collins—that announced the discovery through deep learning of halicin, the first new antibiotic compound for 30 years, which kills over 35 powerful bacteria, including antimicrobial-resistant tuberculosis, the superbug C. difficile, and two of the World Health Organization's top-three most deadly bacteria. In 2020, Collins, Barzilay and the MIT Jameel Clinic were also awarded funding through The Audacious Project to expand on the discovery of halicin in using AI to respond to the antibiotic resistance crisis through the development of new classes of antibiotics. In 2024 and 2025, Barzilay oversaw the release of the fully open-source Boltz model series, a family of biomolecular structure prediction, binding affinity, and molecular design AI models.

== Awards and recognition ==
In 2017, Barzilay won the MacArthur Fellowship, known as the "Genius Grant", for "developing machine learning methods that enable computers to process and analyze vast amounts of human language data." She is also a recipient of various awards including the NSF Career Award, the MIT Technology Review TR-35 Award, Microsoft Faculty Fellowship and several Best Paper Awards at NAACL and ACL. Her teaching has also been recognized by MIT as she won the Jamieson Teaching Award in 2016. She was nominated an AAAI Fellow in 2018 by the Association for the Advancement of Artificial Intelligence.

In 2020, she became the first recipient of the $1 million AAAI Squirrel AI Award for Artificial Intelligence for the Benefit of Humanity. In 2023, she was elected to the National Academy of Medicine and the National Academy of Engineering. In 2025, she was the recipient of the IEEE Frances E. Allen Medal and featured in the TIME100 AI 2025 List. In 2026, Barzilay and James J. Collins were awarded as a team with the Pritzker Prize for AI in Science Research Excellence for their work in applying deep learning to antibiotic discovery and design.
