= AAAI Award for Artificial Intelligence for the Benefit of Humanity =

Annual American computer-science prize

- Awarded for: Recognizing positive impacts of artificial intelligence to protect, enhance, and improve human life
- Country: United States
- Presented by: Association for the Advancement of Artificial Intelligence (AAAI) and Squirrel AI
- Reward: US$25,000
- First award: February 2021; 5 years ago
- Final award: February 2024
- Website: aaai.org/Awards/squirrel-ai-award.php

The AAAI Award for Artificial Intelligence for the Benefit of Humanity is an annual prize given by the Association for the Advancement of Artificial Intelligence to recognize the positive impacts of AI to meaningfully improve, protect, and enhance human life. The award is presented annually at the AAAI conference in February. In its first two years, the associated reward was US$1 million, but has since been changed to $25,000. Funding is provided by the Chinese online education company Squirrel AI.

The first recipient, in 2021, was Regina Barzilay of MIT for her work developing machine learning models to address drug synthesis and early-stage breast cancer diagnosis.

== Recipients ==
Year	Recipient	Rationale
2021	Regina Barzilay	For her work developing machine learning models to address drug synthesis and early-stage breast cancer diagnosis.
2022	Cynthia Rudin	For pioneering scientific work in the area of interpretable and transparent AI systems in real-world deployments, the advocacy for these features in highly sensitive areas such as social justice and medical diagnosis, and serving as a role model for researchers and practitioners.
2023	Tuomas Sandholm	For outstanding scientific and software contributions to the design and implementation of organ exchanges, and their direct impact on both practice and policy.
2024	Milind Tambe	For ground-breaking applications of novel AI techniques to public safety and security, conservation, and public health, benefiting humanity on an international scale.
2025	Stuart J. Russell	For his work on the conceptual and theoretical foundations of provably beneficial AI and his leadership in creating the field of AI safety.
2026	Shakir Mohammed	For significant contributions to maximizing social benefit by empowering communities worldwide to learn, contribute, debate, and shape how AI is used.

== See also ==
- AAAI Awards
- List of computer science awards
- Association for the Advancement of Artificial Intelligence
- Squirrel AI
- Turing Award
