= Project CETI =

Initiative for understanding the communication of sperm whales

- Founded: 2020
- Type: Non-profit
- Purpose: Understanding the communication of sperm whales
- Fields: Marine Biology, Artificial Intelligence, Robotics, and Linguistics
- Lead: David Gruber
- Website: www.projectceti.org

Project CETI is an international initiative to understand the acoustic communication of sperm whales using advances in artificial intelligence. The project has an interdisciplinary scientific board including marine biologists, artificial intelligence researchers, roboticists, theoretical computer scientists, and linguists. Its name, Cetacean Translation Initiative, is a reference to the SETI Institute. The project has a base on the island of Dominica where recordings are being collected.

The organization has been selected as a TED Audacious Project. CETI researchers have identified 156 distinct codas and their basic components, a "sperm whale phonetic alphabet" much like phonemes.

In the sperm whale's head, the organs above the jaw are devoted to sound generation

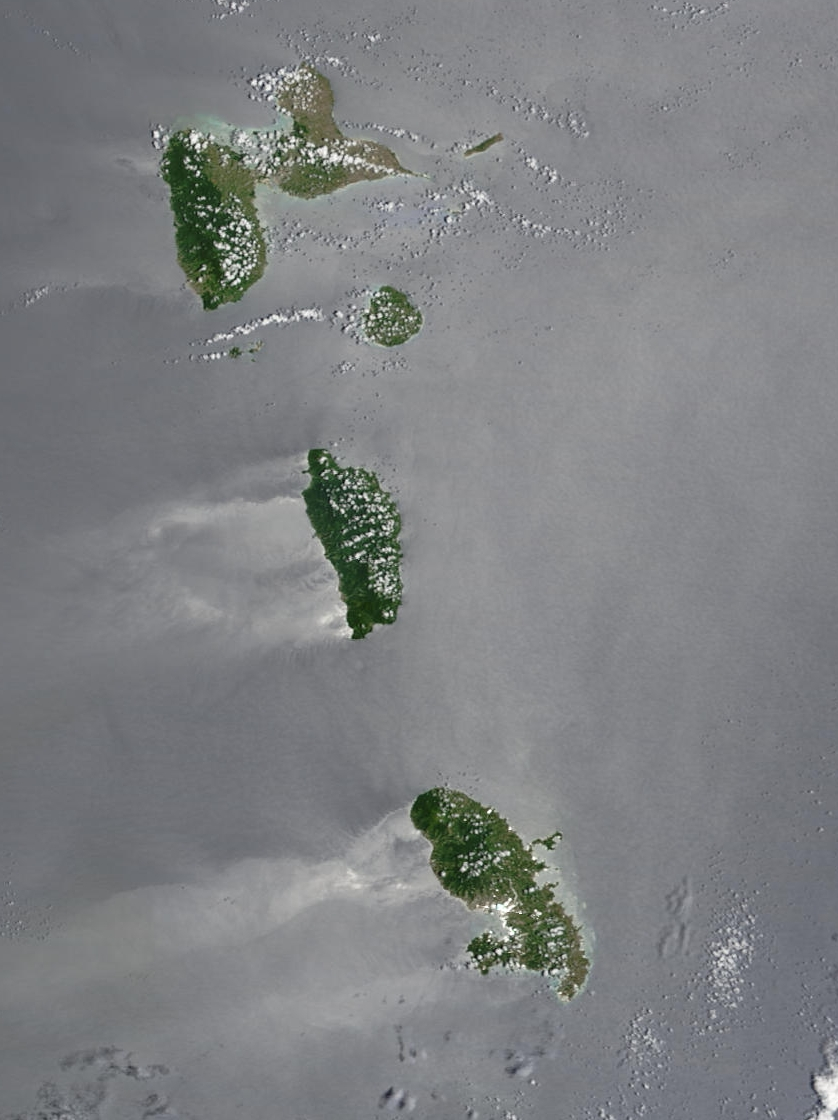
Dominica is an island nation in the Eastern Caribbean Sea located between Guadeloupe and Martinique

== See also ==
- Whale sound
- Human–animal communication
- Animal cognition
- Animal communication
- Interspecies communication
- Communication with extraterrestrial intelligence
