= SIRUM (organization) =

Drug redistribution nonprofit

- Founded: 2009
- Founder: Adam Kircher, George Wang, Kiah Williams
- Type: Non-governmental organization
- Location: Palo Alto, United States
- Region served: United States
- Website: sirum.org

SIRUM (Supporting Initiatives to Redistribute Unused Medicine) is a non-profit social enterprise started by three Stanford University students to decrease the amount of medicine going to waste in the U.S. by redistributing unused, unexpired drugs to safety-net clinics and other organizations. They are the largest redistributor of surplus medicine in the United States.

== Background ==
An estimated $5 billion worth of usable medicine goes to waste each year in the United States—yet 1 in 4 adults report difficulty affording prescription drugs. Medication non-adherence in America results in an estimated 131,000 annual deaths, costing up to $528 billion annually. Wasting $11 billion of usable medicine each year has consequences for Americans: it contributes to polluted air and water supplies, and leads to the duplicative purchasing and manufacturing of drugs to meet patient needs—which could otherwise be met by drawing on medication surplus.

Much of the surplus unused medicine wasted each year resides with healthcare organizations, long-term care facilities, pharmaceutical manufacturers and wholesalers. Because these surplus medications remain in institutional settings throughout their life cycles, their integrity is carefully maintained by trained healthcare professionals. Patients who cannot afford to purchase the prescriptions they need could greatly benefit from having access to these safe, unexpired, and unopened medications that otherwise go to waste.

== Operations ==
SIRUM leverages technology to connect surplus unused medicine to patients in need. SIRUM provides “recycling” boxes to medicine donors such as long-term care facilities and licensed pharmacies, who package unopened, unexpired medication and ship them directly to community partners such as safety-net providers, nonprofit pharmacies, and drug repository programs. The organizations’ healthcare providers or pharmacists then distribute the donated medication to patients. SIRUM provides an online platform to handle record-keeping, shipping, and other logistics, making medicine donation an easy, enticing option over medicine destruction.

SIRUM operates under Good Samaritan laws that have passed in 44 states. These laws provide legal protection and regulatory guidelines for medicine donation and redistribution, including the establishment of drug repository programs.

=== Impact ===
As of December 2024, SIRUM has facilitated the redistribution of $280 million worth of medicine, shipped over 40,000 donations through its platform, and helped more than 300,000 uninsured and underinsured patients access life-saving medications.

== History ==
SIRUM’s work began in California, first connecting a nursing home as a medicine donor with a Santa Clara County recipient facility. SIRUM began expanding to other states in 2014.

In 2015, SIRUM participated in startup accelerator Y Combinator and was featured in the New York Times. In 2019, SIRUM received recognition from United States Agency for International Development (USAID) and the Environmental Protection Agency (EPA) as an innovator in global waste reduction. In 2020, SIRUM was featured on the TED Conference mainstage and selected as a grantee of the Audacious Project, with their initiative to redistribute $772 million worth of prescription medication to 1 million patients.
