= Squirrel AI =

Educational technology company

Squirrel Ai Learning
- Native name: 松鼠Ai
- Industry: Education
- Founded: 2014
- Founder: Derek Haoyang Li, Jason Zhou, David Fan, Joleen Liang
- Headquarters: Shanghai, China
- Products: Intelligent Adaptive Learning System (IALS)
- Services: Education Technology
- Website: squirrelai.com

Squirrel Ai Learning is an international educational technology company that specializes in intelligent adaptive learning and was one of the first companies in the world to offer large scale AI-powered adaptive education solutions.

== Methodology ==
Squirrel Ai Learning uses artificial intelligence to tailor lesson plans to each individual student. The company's AI researchers have access to the world's largest student databases, which are used to train the AI algorithms.

Squirrel Ai Learning works with teachers to identify the most fine-grained possible concepts ("knowledge points") for a course in order to precisely target learning gaps. For example, middle school mathematics is broken into over 10,000 points such as rational numbers, the properties of a triangle, and the Pythagorean theorem. Each point is linked to related items, forming a "knowledge graph". Each knowledge point is addressed by videos, examples and practice problems. A textbook might address 3,000 points; ALEKS, another adaptive learning platform, uses 1,000.

Each student begins with a diagnostic test to identify where to begin their learning. The system continues to refine its graph as more students proceed. Learning is not student-directed. The system decides the order of topics.

== History and milestones ==
Squirrel Ai Learning was founded by Derek Haoyang Li in 2014.

In March, 2017, The Squirrel Ai Intelligent Adaptive Learning System (IALS) was launched. IALS utilizes artificial intelligence to customize lessons, practice and evaluations for each individual student.

In 2018, Squirrel Ai Learning established a joint research lab of AI adaptive learning with the institute of Automation of the Chinese Academy of Sciences.

By 2019, Squirrel Ai Learning had opened 2,000 learning centers in 200 cities and registered over a million students in Asia.

In 2019, Squirrel Ai Learning opened a research lab in partnership with Carnegie Mellon University.

As of 2019, Squirrel Ai Learning had raised over $180 million in funding and in 2018 it surpassed $1 billion in valuation.

In 2020, Squirrel Ai Learning launched the $1 million AAAI Squirrel AI Award for Artificial Intelligence for the Benefit of Humanity in partnership with AAAI. The inaugural award was given to Regina Barzilay for her work developing machine learning models to address drug synthesis and early-stage breast cancer diagnosis.

In 2020, Squirrel Ai Learning established strategic partnership with DingTalk, Alibaba Group.

As of 2021, Squirrel Ai Learning had served over 60,000 public schools, in over 1200 cities in Asia.

Squirrel Ai plans to start offering its services in the United States in 2026. The American arm is separate from the Chinese company to avoid regulatory hurdles. As of January 2026, it had set up an "independent technology platform" in the US.

== Recognition ==
Squirrel Ai Learning has gained recognition both in Asia and internationally including:

- Squirrel Ai Learning was named one of the World's Top 30 AI application case in the 2018 Synced Machine Intelligence Awards.
- In June 2019, Squirrel Ai Learning was named as one of the 50 smartest companies in China by MIT technology review.
- Squirrel Ai Learning won the GITEX 2019 Best Education Technology Award.
- In 2020, Squirrel Ai Learning won the UNESCO AI Innovation Award.
- Squirrel Ai Learning was listed in the 2020 CB Insight's AI 100, CB Insights' annual ranking of the 100 most promising AI startups in the world.
- Squirrel Ai Learning won Edtech Review's Best AI in Education Company of the Year award 2020.

== See also ==
- Artificial intelligence in education
