= Cynthia Rudin =

American computer scientist and statistician (born 1976)

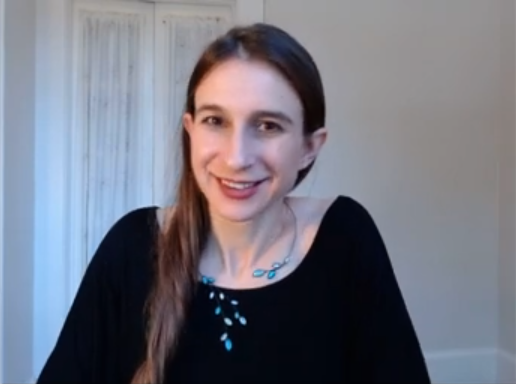
- Rudin in 2020
- Born: 1976 (age 49–50)
- Education: University at Buffalo; Princeton University (PhD)
- Scientific career
- Workplaces: Duke University
- Thesis: Boosting, Margin and Dynamics
- Doctoral advisors: Robert Schapire; Ingrid Daubechies

Cynthia Diane Rudin (born 1976) is an American computer scientist and statistician specializing in machine learning and known for her work in interpretable machine learning. She is the director of the Interpretable Machine Learning Lab at Duke University, where she is a professor of computer science, electrical and computer engineering, statistical science, and biostatistics and bioinformatics. In 2022, she won the Squirrel AI Award for Artificial Intelligence for the Benefit of Humanity from the Association for the Advancement of Artificial Intelligence (AAAI) for her work on the importance of transparency for AI systems in high-risk domains. In addition, she was elected as a fellow of the American Association for the Advancement of Science (AAAS) in 2024, in recognition of her research in machine learning.

== Education and career ==
Rudin graduated summa cum laude from the University at Buffalo with a double major in mathematical physics and music theory in 1999. She completed her Ph.D. in applied and computational mathematics at Princeton University in 2004. Her dissertation – entitled Boosting, Margins, and Dynamics – was supervised by Ingrid Daubechies and Robert Schapire.

Following positions as a postdoctoral researcher at New York University and an associate research scientist at Columbia University, she took a faculty position at the MIT Sloan School of Management in 2009, and then moved to Duke University in 2016.

She has served as chair of the Data Mining Section of INFORMS and of the Statistical Learning and Data Science Section of the American Statistical Association. She served on the ISAT faculty advisory board for DARPA, was a councilor for AAAI, and a member of the Bureau of Justice Assistance Criminal Justice Technology Forecasting Group (BJA CJTFG). She currently serves on the executive committee member for ACM SIGKDD, and is a member of both the Committee on Applied and Theoretical Statistics (CATS) and the Committee on Law and Justice (CLAJ) of the National Academies of Sciences, Engineering, and Medicine. She is an associate editor for Management Science, the Harvard Data Science Review, and the Journal of Quantitative Criminology.

== Additional awards and honours ==
In 2019, Rudin was elected as a Fellow of the American Statistical Association, and of the Institute of Mathematical Statistics "for her contributions to interpretable machine learning algorithms, prediction in large scale medical databases, and theoretical properties of ranking algorithms". She was elected as a Fellow of the Association for the Advancement of Artificial Intelligence in 2022.

She received the prestigious Guggenheim Fellowship in Natural Sciences in 2022.

She received the 2013 INFORMS Innovative Applications in Analytics Award for her work on electrical grid reliability, the 2016 INFORMS Innovative Applications in Analytics Award for work on interpretable machine learning models for assessing cognitive decline, and the 2019 INFORMS Innovative Applications in Analytics Award for work on interpretable machine learning models for seizure prediction in critically ill patients, leading to the 2HELPS2B score used in intensive care units.

Rudin was the co-winner of the Manufacturing and Service Operations Management Best Operations Management paper in Operations Research Award from INFORMS in 2021.

Rudin was a winner of the FICO Recognition Award for the Explainable Machine Learning Challenge in 2018.

Rudin was a Finalist for 2017 Daniel H. Wagner Prize for Excellence in Operations Research in 2017.

Rudin was named by Businessinsider.com as one of the 12 most impressive professors at MIT in 2015.

Rudin has given keynotes talks at KDD (2014 and 2019), AISTATS, and the Nobel Conference (2021), and IJCAI 2025.

Rudin was named to the 2025 class of ACM Fellows, "for contributions to and leadership in interpretable machine learning and societal applications".

Rudin received the IJCAI John McCarthy Award in 2025.

== Work ==
Starting in 2007, Rudin was the lead scientist on a collaborative project between Columbia University and Con Edison to use machine learning to maintain New York City's secondary electrical distribution network. This project was awarded the 2013 INFORMS Innovative Applications in Analytics Award.

Along with student Tong Wang and detectives from the Cambridge Police Department, Cambridge MA, Rudin developed the Series Finder algorithm for crime series detection. Series Finder was built into the Patternizr algorithm used by the NYPD to detect patterns of crime committed by the same individual(s).

Rudin's work on scoring systems with former student Berk Ustun was used for developing medical scoring systems for sleep apnea screening and diagnosis, for seizure prediction in ICU patients, for ADHD screening in adults, and for detection of cognitive decline using handwriting analysis (the Clock Drawing test). This work earned the 2016 and 2019 INFORMS Innovative Applications in Analytics Award, and was a finalist for the Wagner Prize.

At Duke, Rudin coached two teams of undergraduate students who won the 2018 NTIRE Single Image Superresolution Competition (Track 1, classic bicubic), and the 2018 PoeTix Literary Turing Competition.

Rudin is well known for her work critiquing black box models in the criminal justice system and for high-stakes decisions, on the grounds that interpretable models can be constructed that are equally accurate. Her work "Stop Explaining Black Box Machine Learning Models for High Stakes Decisions and use Interpretable Models Instead," Nature Machine Intelligence, 2019, outlines several other reasons. She has led several efforts to encourage work on societal good applications in machine learning, including editing the Special Issue on Machine Learning for Science and Society in the Machine Learning journal, and organizing the American Statistical Association's report "Discovery with Data: Leveraging Statistics with Computer Science to Transform Science and Society." Her work is an influential source for the Human-Centered Artificial Intelligence community.

In her graduate work at Princeton, Rudin proved convergence properties of boosting algorithms. Her PhD thesis answered a well-studied question of whether AdaBoost maximizes the L1 margin, which is a type of distance between a decision boundary and the data observation closest to it.

== See also ==
- Timnit Gebru
- Joy Buolamwini
- Explainable artificial intelligence
