= Inkomoko =

Rwandan business support organisation

Inkomoko, launched in Rwanda in 2012, is a social enterprise supporting micro and small businesses across Africa, with a focus on refugees and displaced individuals. Inkomoko has served more than 100,000 clients, and operates in 5 countries (Rwanda, Kenya, Ethiopia, South Sudan, and Chad).

By 2030, It plans to expand to 8 countries, serving 500,000 businesses and benefiting more than 7 million people across Africa. In the same time, with support from the Audacious Project, Inkomoko will reach 335,000 entrepreneurs and impact 4 million lives.

== History ==
The organization was founded by social entrepreneurs, Sara Leedom and Julienne Oyler, and began in Rwanda in 2012 to support small businesses. Inkomoko pivoted to support refugee entrepreneurs in 2016, aligned with the changing regulations of support from the UN Refugee Agency (UNHCR) to move to a cash-transfer model. Inkomoko was invited to support the economic inclusion of refugees in camps at that time. After a successful pilot in Rwanda, Inkomoko expanded its signature offering of providing entrepreneurship training and financing to refugee entrepreneurs, and has grown into the Africa's largest lender to refugee-owned businesses.

By 2025, Inkomoko had supported over 100,000 entrepreneurs, distributed over $24 million in financing creating 60,000+ jobs, achieved 70% average revenue growth within six months and maintained a 96% loan repayment rate.

== Business model ==
Inkomoko supports mixed cohorts of forcibly displaced persons and host community members, providing them with skills training, coaching, and market connections for long-term growth. Half of these clients are projected to receive a total of $27 million in affordable financing through digital platforms. It also engages in policy advocacy shaping financial inclusion in Kenya, most recently on the Shirika Plan. It also collaborates with academic and international partners on refugee economic integration research, such as the Refugee Led Research Hub at University of Oxford, as well as two other UK universities.

== Challenges and innovation ==
Operating across multiple countries in Africa, Inkomoko supports entrepreneurs through "graduation pathways" that transition them to commercial financing to reduce dependency on aid -- which continues to decrease in the region. Inkomoko also addresses gender disparities with targeted programs for women, with women comprising more than 60% of its clients. Inkomoko also bridges digital gaps in refugee camps by offering offline training alongside AI-driven digital tools for loan assessment and financial inclusion.

== Recognition and partnerships ==
Inkomoko received The Audacious Project award from TED in 2025, and was recently featured in the 'Financial Times'' as the 8th fastest growing company in Africa in 2025. Inkomoko continues to partner with UNHCR and Amahoro Coalition to host the Africa Private Sector Forum on Displacement to encourage investment into refugee economies.

Inkomoko also partners with a range of government, private sector to deliver impact in the communities it serves. Inkomoko has worked with educational programs, including University of Global Health Equity, Carnegie Mellon University - Africa, Southern New Hampshire University, to continue innovating for refugee inclusion.
