= Naama Barkai =

Israeli biophysicist

Naama Barkai (Hebrew: נעמה ברקאי) is an Israeli systems biologist and professor for Molecular Genetics and Physics of Complex Systems at the Weizmann Institute of Science in Rehovot, Israel, and a member of the European Molecular Biology Organization (EMBO).

== Education and career ==
In 1995, Barkai earned a PhD summa cum laude in theoretical physics at the Hebrew University of Jerusalem, on the statistical mechanisms of learning. Barkai pursued a post-doc in the group of Stanislas Leibler at Princeton University, where she worked on theoretical analysis of biochemical networks. During this time, she was supported by the Robert H. Dicke Fellowship. From 2001 to 2004, Barkai was an EMBO young investigator. Her work on deciphering mechanisms of control in complex biological systems combining experimental work with mathematical modelling shaped the field of systems biology. From 2005 to 2006 she was a visiting professor at Harvard University. In 2007, she was elected as EMBO member.

She is on the scientific advisory board of Evogene Ltd.

== Awards and honours ==
- Rothschild Prize (2018)
- FEBS/EMBO Women in Science Award (2008)
- Helen and Martin Kimmel Award for Innovative Investigation (2007)
- Teva Prize for Research in Systems Biology (2005)
- Morris L. Levinson Biology Prize from the Weizmann Institute of Science (2004)
- Michael Bruno Memorial Award (2004)

== Selected publications ==
- Barkai, Naama (December 2014). "Loss of growth homeostasis by genetic decoupling of cell division from biomass growth: implication for size control mechanisms." Molecular Systems Biology. 10: 769.
- Barkai, Naama (April 2008). "Two strategies for gene regulation by promoter nucleosomes." Genome Research. 18: 1084–1091.
- Barkai, Naama (September 2002). "Robustness of the BMP morphogen gradient in Drosophila embryonic patterning." Nature. 419: 304–308.
- Barkai, Naama (June 1997). "Robustness in simple biochemical networks." Nature. 387: pages913–917 .
