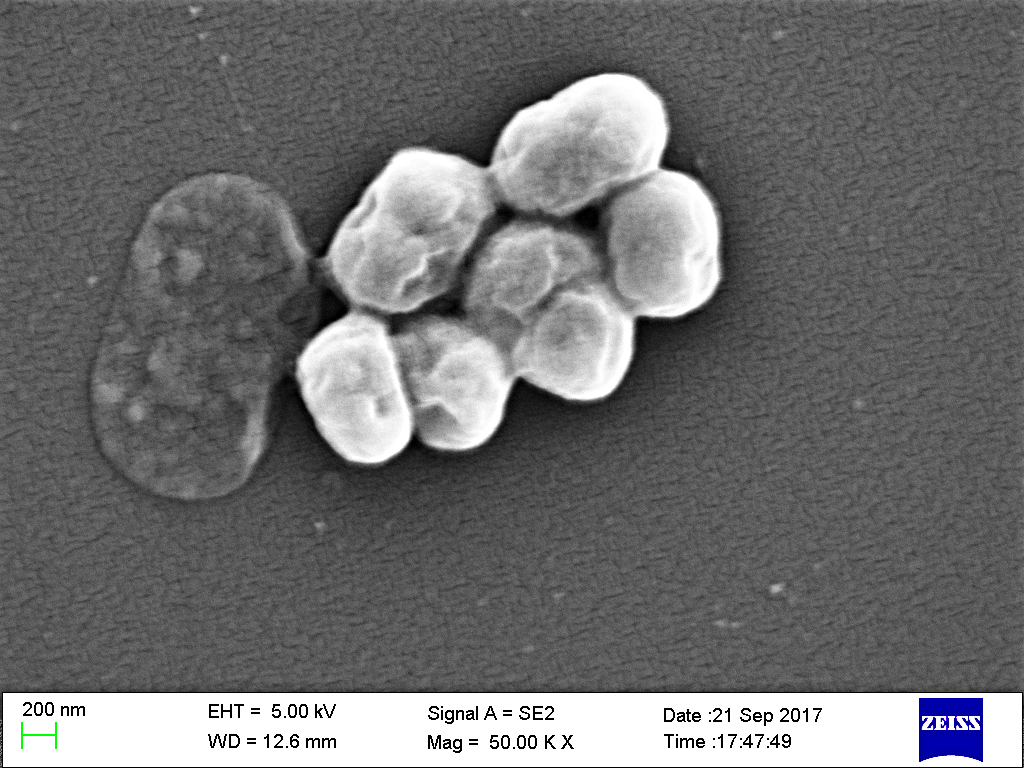

Scientific classification
- Domain: Bacteria
- Kingdom: Pseudomonadati
- Phylum: Pseudomonadota
- Class: Gammaproteobacteria
- Order: Pseudomonadales
- Family: Moraxellaceae
- Genus: Acinetobacter
- Species: A. baumannii

Binomial name
- Acinetobacter baumannii Bouvet and Grimont 1986

= Acinetobacter baumannii =

Species of bacterium

Acinetobacter baumannii is a typically short, almost round, rod-shaped (coccobacillus) Gram-negative bacterium. It is named after the bacteriologist Paul Baumann. It can be an opportunistic pathogen in humans, affecting people with compromised immune systems, and is becoming increasingly important as a hospital-derived (nosocomial) infection. While other species of the genus Acinetobacter are often found in soil samples (leading to the common misconception that A. baumannii is a soil organism, too), it is almost exclusively isolated from hospital environments. Although occasionally it has been found in environmental soil and water samples, its natural habitat is still not known.

Bacteria of this genus lack flagella but exhibit twitching or swarming motility, likely mediated by type IV pili. Motility in A. baumannii may also be due to the excretion of exopolysaccharide, creating a film of high-molecular-weight sugar chains behind the bacterium to move forward. Clinical microbiologists typically differentiate members of the genus Acinetobacter from other Moraxellaceae by performing an oxidase test, as Acinetobacter spp. are the only members of the Moraxellaceae to lack cytochrome c oxidases. A. baumannii is strictly aerobic, meaning it needs oxygen to grow. Although studies have shown that A. baumannii is able to survive in varying levels of oxygen, including no oxygen, by entering a dormant state.

A. baumannii is part of the ACB complex (A. baumannii, A. calcoaceticus, and Acinetobacter genomic species 13TU). It is difficult to determine the specific species of members of the ACB complex and they comprise the most clinically relevant members of the genus. A. baumannii has also been identified as an ESKAPE pathogen (Enterococcus faecium, Staphylococcus aureus, Klebsiella pneumoniae, Acinetobacter baumannii, Pseudomonas aeruginosa, and Enterobacter species), a group of pathogens with a high rate of antibiotic resistance that are responsible for the majority of nosocomial infections.

Colloquially, A. baumannii is referred to as "Iraqibacter" due to its seemingly sudden emergence in military treatment facilities during the Iraq War. It has continued to be an issue for veterans and soldiers who served in Iraq and Afghanistan. Multidrug-resistant A. baumannii has spread to civilian hospitals in part due to the transport of infected soldiers through multiple medical facilities. During the COVID-19 pandemic, coinfection with A. baumannii secondary to SARS-CoV-2 infections has been reported multiple times in medical publications.

== OmpA ==
Adhesion can be a critical determinant of virulence for bacteria. The ability to attach to host cells allows bacteria to interact with them in various ways, whether by type III secretion system or simply by holding on against the prevailing movement of fluids. Outer membrane protein A (OmpA) has been shown to be involved in the adherence of A. baumannii to epithelial cells. This allows the bacteria to invade the cells through the zipper mechanism. The protein was also shown to localize to the mitochondria of epithelial cells. OmpA attachment to mitochondria induces it leading to swelling of mitochondria. This releases cytochrome c, which causes formation of apoptosome. This leads to the apoptosis of the cell.

== Antibiotic resistance ==
Mechanisms of antibiotic resistance can be categorized into three groups. First, resistance can be achieved by reducing membrane permeability or increasing efflux of the antibiotic and thus preventing access to the target. Second, bacteria can protect the antibiotic target through genetic mutation or post-translational modification. Third, antibiotics can be directly inactivated by hydrolysis or modification. One of the most important weapons in the armoury of Acinetobacter is its impressive genetic plasticity, facilitating rapid genetic mutations and rearrangements as well as integration of foreign determinants carried by mobile genetic elements. Of these, insertion sequences are considered one of the key forces shaping bacterial genomes and ultimately evolution.

=== AbaR resistance islands ===
Pathogenicity islands, relatively common genetic structures in bacterial pathogens, are composed of two or more adjacent genes that increase a pathogen's virulence. They may contain genes that encode toxins, coagulate blood, or as in this case, allow the bacteria to resist antibiotics. AbaR-type resistance islands are typical of drug-resistant A. baumannii, and different variations may be present in a given strain. Each consists of a transposon backbone of about 16.3 Kb that facilitates horizontal gene transfer. This makes horizontal gene transfer of this and similar pathogenicity islands more likely because, when genetic material is taken up by a new bacterium, the transposons allow the pathogenicity island to integrate into the new microorganism's genome. In this case, it would grant the new microorganism the potential to resist certain antibiotics. Antibiotic resistance genes are commonly transferred between Gram-negative bacteria through plasmids via conjugation, which accelerates the appearance of new resistant strains. AbaR's contain several genes for antibiotic resistance, all flanked by insertion sequences. There exist several resistance genes circulating along A. baumannii that can be clustered in replicon groups, and may be transferred from the extensively drug-resistant Acinetobacter baumannii (XDR- AB) and New Delhi Metallo-beta-lactamase-1-producing Acinetobacter baumannii (NDM- AB) to environmental isolates of Acinetobacter spp. Conjugation experiments demonstrated that the blaOXA-23, blaPER-1, and aphA6 genes could be successfully transferred between the clinical and the environmental isolates via the plasmid group GR6 or class 1 integrons through in vitro conjugation. In collaboration with some other genes, they provide resistance to aminoglycosides, aminocyclitols, tetracycline, and chloramphenicol.

=== Efflux pumps ===
Efflux pumps are protein machines that use energy to pump antibiotics and other small molecules that get into the bacterial cytoplasm and the periplasmic space out of the cell. By constantly pumping antibiotics out of the cell, bacteria can increase the concentration of a given antibiotic required to kill them or inhibit their growth when the target of the antibiotic is inside the bacterium. A. baumannii is known to have two major efflux pumps which decrease its susceptibility to antimicrobials. The first, AdeB, has been shown to be responsible for aminoglycoside resistance. The second, AdeDE, is responsible for efflux of a wide range of substrates, including tetracycline, chloramphenicol, and various carbapenems. Many other efflux pumps have been implicated in A. baumannii resistant strains.

=== Small RNA ===
Bacterial small RNAs are noncoding RNAs that regulate various cellular processes. Three sRNAs, AbsR11, AbsR25, and AbsR28, have been experimentally validated in the MTCC 1425 (ATCC15308) strain, which is a (multidrug-resistant) strain showing resistance to 12 antibiotics. AbsR25 sRNA could play a role in the efflux pump regulation and drug resistance.

=== Beta-lactamase ===
A. baumannii has been shown to produce at least one beta-lactamase, which is an enzyme responsible for cleaving the four-atom lactam ring typical of beta-lactam antibiotics. Beta-lactam antibiotics are structurally related to penicillin, which inhibits synthesis of the bacterial cell wall. The cleaving of the lactam ring renders these antibiotics harmless to the bacteria. A. baumannii have been observed to express two intrinsic beta-lactamases: an Acinetobacter-derived cephalosporinase (ADC), which is class C beta-lactamase, and an OXA-51-like beta-lactamase, belonging to class D.

=== Biofilm formation ===
A. baumannii has been noted for its apparent ability to survive on artificial surfaces for an extended period of time, therefore allowing it to persist in the hospital environment. This is thought to be due to its ability to form biofilms. For many biofilm-forming bacteria, the process is mediated by flagella. However, for A. baumannii, this process seems to be mediated by pili. Further, disruption of the putative pili chaperone and usher genes csuC and csuE were shown to inhibit biofilm formation. The formation of biofilms has been shown to alter the metabolism of microorganisms within the biofilm, consequently reducing their sensitivity to antibiotics. This may be because fewer nutrients are available deeper within the biofilm. A slower metabolism can prevent the bacteria from taking up an antibiotic or performing a vital function fast enough for particular antibiotics to have an effect. They also provide a physical barrier against larger molecules and may prevent desiccation of the bacteria. In general, biofilm formation has been linked so far with BfmRS TCS (two-component system) regulating Csu pili, Csu expression regulated by the GacSA TCS, biofilm-associated proteins BapAb, synthesis of the exopolysaccharide poly-β-1,6-N-acetylglucosamine PNAG, acyl-homoserine lactones through AbaR receptor, and AbaI autoinducer synthase. Moreover, inactivation of adeRS operon negatively affects biofilm formation and prompts decreased expression of AdeABC. Disruption of abaF has displayed an increase in fosfomycin susceptibility and a decrease in biofilm formation and virulence, suggesting a major role for this pump. A genome-scale metabolic model has also been developed for A. baumannii, which helps map the nutrients and metabolic pathways the bacterium relies on for growth and survival. Such models can provide insights into how metabolic adaptations may contribute to persistence strategies like biofilm formation.

The formation of biofilm involves cell attachment, a fundamental process typically triggered by environmental metabolites. A. baumannii is able to use vanillic acid as its sole carbon source, like its close relative A. baylyi. This metabolic pathway is regulated by transcriptional repressor VanR. When vanillic acid enters the cell through VanP and VanK porins it binds to the VanR regulator, which is usually bound to PvanABKP and Pcsu promoters. This binding causes repression of PvanABKP and Pcsu promoters, which leads to increased expression of VanP and VanK porins in the cell membrane and increased expression of Csu pili. The increased expression of Csu pili results a high biofilm formation phenotype of A. baumannii.

== Infections ==
Acinetobacter baumannii is most often isolated from hospital or healthcare environments, although those are not the only places where this bacterium can be found. A. baumannii has also been isolated from samples taken from raw meat. Infections and outbreaks are less commonly caused by raw and undercooked foods because most people who contract this opportunistic pathogen but have a strong immune system do not become sick.

Recent computational studies using genome-scale metabolic models (such as iCN718) have examined how Acinetobacter baumannii adapts to host environments. Graph-based analyses of metabolic networks indicate that metabolite accessibility differs between laboratory and infection-like conditions, including modeled wound and lung infection site environments. Research and computational iterations suggest the membrane biosynthesis pathways and phosphate-dependent processes become more constrained during infection, highlighting potential environment-specific metabolic vulnerabilities.

== Signs and symptoms of infection ==
A. baumannii is an opportunistic pathogen with a range of different diseases, each with their own symptoms. Some possible types of A. baumannii infections include:

- Pneumonia
- Bloodstream infections
- Meningitis
- Wound and surgical site infections, including necrotizing fasciitis
- Urinary tract infections

Symptoms of A. baumannii infections are often indistinguishable from other opportunistic infections caused by other opportunistic bacteria - including Klebsiella pneumoniae and Streptococcus pneumoniae.

Symptoms of A. baumannii infections in turn range from fevers and chills, rash, confusion and/or altered mental states, pain or burning sensations when urinating, strong urge to urinate frequently, sensitivity to bright light, nausea (with or without vomiting), muscle and chest pains, breathing problems, and cough (with or without yellow, green, or bloody mucus). In some cases, A. baumannii may present no infection or symptoms, as with colonizing an open wound or tracheostomy site.

== Treatment ==
When infections are caused by antibiotic-susceptible Acinetobacter isolates, there may be several therapeutic options, including a broad-spectrum cephalosporin (ceftazidime or cefepime), a combination beta-lactam/beta-lactamase inhibitor (i.e., one that includes sulbactam), or a carbapenem (e.g., imipenem or meropenem). Because most infections are now resistant to multiple drugs, determining what susceptibilities the particular strain has is necessary for treatment to be successful. Traditionally, infections were treated with imipenem or meropenem, but a steady rise in carbapenem-resistant A. baumannii has been noted. Consequently, treatment methods often fall back on polymyxins, particularly colistin although tetracyclines have shown promise in MDR A. baumannii. Colistin is considered a drug of last resort because it often causes kidney damage, among other side effects. Prevention methods in hospitals focus on increased hand-washing and more diligent sterilization procedures. An A. baumannii infection was recently treated using phage therapy. Phages are viruses that attack bacteria, and have also been demonstrated to resensitize A. baumannii to antibiotics it normally resists.

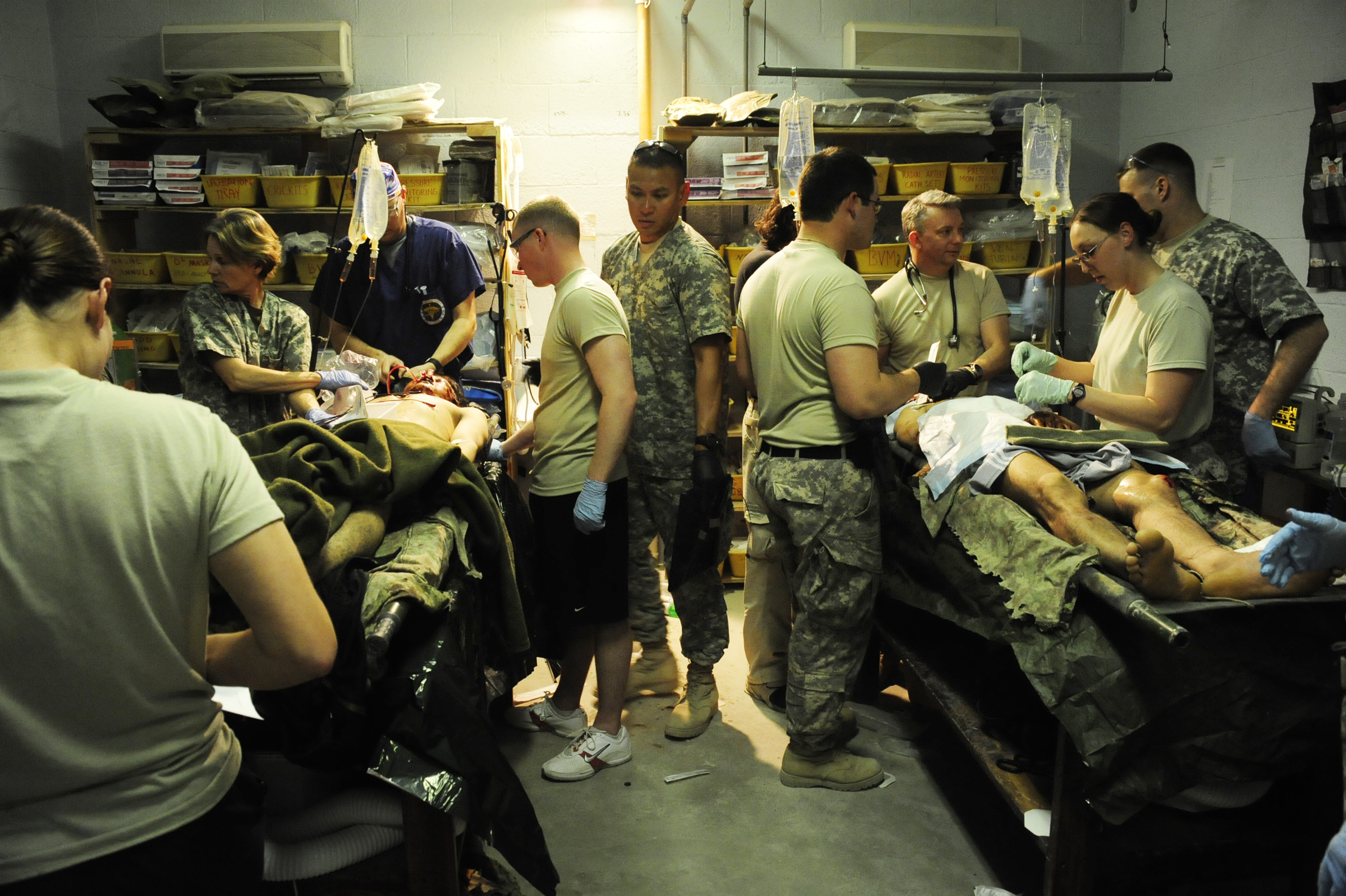
Traumatic injuries, like those from improvised explosive devices, leave large open areas contaminated with debris that are vulnerable to becoming infected with A. baumannii.

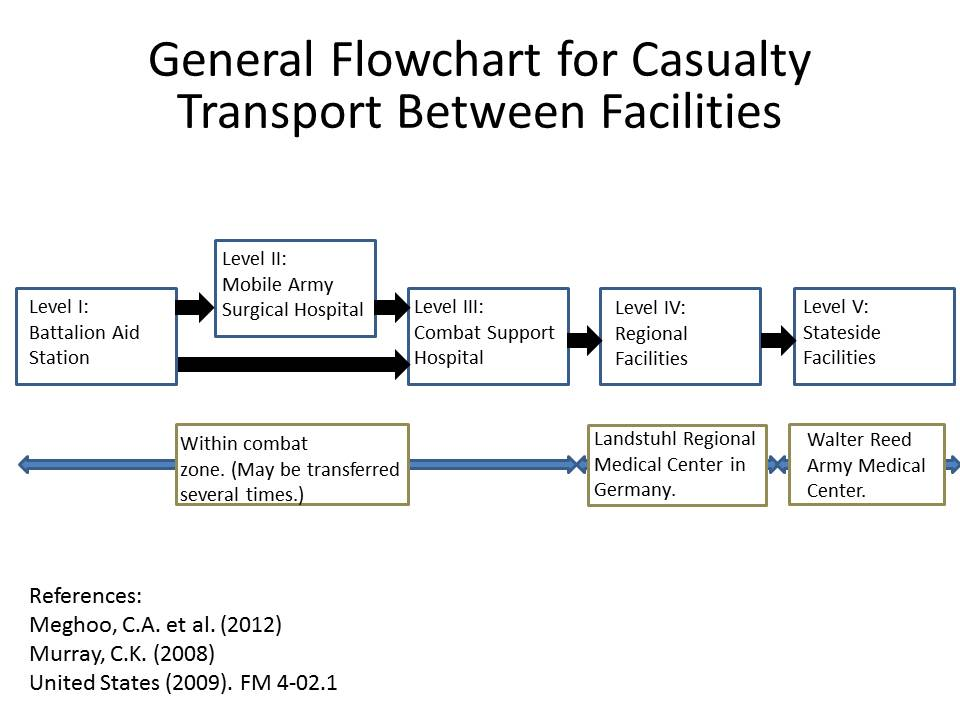
The logistics of transporting wounded soldiers result in patients visiting several facilities where they may acquire A. baumannii infections.

Scientists at MIT, Harvard's Broad Institute and MIT's CSAIL found a compound named halicin using deep learning that can effectively kill A. baumannii. The compound is a repurposed drug. The candidate drug abaucin has narrow-spectrum effectiveness. Zosurabalpin kills A. baumannii, is effective in animal models, and is currently in Phase I clinical trials.

== Occurrence in veterans injured in Iraq and Afghanistan ==
American and other western soldiers in Iraq and Afghanistan were at risk of traumatic injury due to gunfire and improvised explosive devices. Previously, infection was thought to occur due to contamination with A. baumannii at the time of injury. Subsequent studies showed that although A. baumannii may be infrequently isolated from the natural environment, the infection was more likely nosocomially acquired, likely due to the ability of A. baumannii to persist on artificial surfaces for extended periods, and the several facilities to which injured soldiers were exposed during the casualty-evacuation process. Injured soldiers were first taken to level-I facilities, where they were stabilized. Depending on the severity of the injury, the soldiers might then be transferred to a level-II facility, which consists of a forward surgical team, for additional stabilization. Depending on the logistics of the locality, the injured soldiers might be transfer between these facilities several times before finally being taken to a major hospital within the combat zone (level III). Generally after 1–3 days, when the patients were stabilized, they were transferred by air to a regional facility (level IV) for additional treatment. For soldiers serving in Iraq or Afghanistan, this was typically Landstuhl Regional Medical Center in Germany. Finally, the injured soldiers were transferred to hospitals in their home country for rehabilitation and additional treatment. This repeated exposure to many different medical environments seems to be the reason A. baumannii infections have become increasingly common. Multidrug-resistant A. baumannii is a major factor in complicating the treatment and rehabilitation of injured soldiers, and has led to additional deaths.

== Incidence in hospitals ==
Being referred to as an opportunistic infection, A. baumannii infections are highly prevalent in hospital settings. A. baumannii poses very little risk to healthy individuals; however, factors that increase the risks for infection include:

- Having a weakened immune system
- Chronic lung disease
- Diabetes
- Lengthened hospital stays
- Illness that requires use of a hospital ventilator
- Having an open wound treated in a hospital
- Treatments requiring invasive devices like urinary catheters

A. baumannii can be spread through direct contact with surfaces, objects, and the skin of contaminated persons.

The importation of A. baumannii and subsequent presence in hospitals has been well documented. A. baumannii is usually introduced into a hospital by a colonized patient. Due to its ability to survive on artificial surfaces and resist desiccation, it can remain and possibly infect new patients for some time. A baumannii growth is suspected to be favored in hospital settings due to the constant use of antibiotics by patients in the hospital. Acinetobacter can be spread by person-to-person contact or contact with contaminated surfaces. Acinetobacter can enter through open wounds, catheters and breathing tubes. In a study of European intensive care units in 2009, A. baumannii was found to be responsible for 19.1% of ventilator-associated pneumonia cases.

Documented case studies
Country	Reference
Australia	
Brazil	
China	
Germany	
India	
South Korea	
United Kingdom	
United States	
