= Stanislas Leibler =

French–American theoretical and experimental biologist and physicist

- Born: 1957 (age 68–69)
- Education: University of Warsaw (MSc); University of Paris XI (PhD, DSc)
- Known for: Synthetic biology
- Awards: Humboldt Prize (1998); Mendel Medal (2013); Max Delbruck Prize (2015)
- Scientific career
- Fields: Systems biology, Physics
- Workplaces: Institute for Advanced Study; Rockefeller University
- Doctoral students: Marileen Dogterom

Stanislas Leibler (born 1957) is a Polish-French-American theoretical and experimental biologist and physicist. He is Systems Biology Professor at the Institute for Advanced Study in Princeton and the Gladys T. Perkin Professor and Head of the Laboratory of Living Matter at the Rockefeller University.

== Education and career ==
Leibler did his magister work in physics at the University of Warsaw. He received a Ph.D. in theoretical physics in 1981 and Ph.D. in physics in 1984, both at the University of Paris. He spent one year at the École Normale Supérieure and then from 1984 to 1992 he was a Research Fellow at the Saclay Nuclear Research Centre. From 1985 to 1987 he was a Visiting Research Associate at Cornell University and then from 1989 to 1991 at the ESPCI ParisTech in Paris.

He was a professor of physics at Princeton University, becoming a Professor in the Department of Molecular Biology in 1993. He was an Investigator at Howard Hughes Medical Institute (2000–2001), and Tri-Institutional Professor at the Weill Cornell Medical College and the Sloan-Kettering Institute (2003–2010). Since 2001 Leibler has been a professor at The Rockefeller University. Stanislas Leibler joined the faculty of the School of Natural Sciences at the Institute for Advanced Study on April 1, 2009.

Leibler deals both theoretically and experimentally with systems biology–the interaction of genetic and biochemical networks at the cellular level in living organisms and populations. He and his colleagues have developed simple genetic networks in bacteria that act like clocks or logic circuits. A 2000 experiment with Michael Elowitz is considered one of the key results in synthetic biology. They built a synthetic network to implement a particular function in E. coli, namely a negative feedback system of gene regulation, and were able to monitor the system using fluorescent dye proteins.

Leibler was a 1997/98 Humboldt Research Award winner at the European Molecular Biology Laboratory (EMBO) in Heidelberg. In 2015 he won the Max Delbruck Prize awarded by the American Physical Society. In 2016 he was elected to the National Academy of Sciences.

== Works ==
- with Doeke R. Hekstra: Contingency and statistical laws in replicate microbial closed ecosystems. In Cell 149, 1164–1173 (2012).
- with Arvind Murugan, David A. Huse: Speed, dissipation, and error in kinetic proofreading. In Proc. Natl. Acad. Sci. U.S.A. 109, 12034–12039 (2012).
- with José M. G. Vilar, Hao Yuan Kueh, Naama Barkai: Mechanisms of noise-resistance in genetic oscillators. In Proc. Natl. Acad. USA, 99, 5988-5992 (2002).
- with Olivier Rivoire: The Value of Information for Populations in Varying Environments. In J. Stat. Phys. 142, 1124–1166 (2011).
- with Călin C. Guet, Michael B. Elowitz, Weihong Hsing: Combinatorial Synthesis of Genetic Networks. In Science, 296, 1466-1470. (2002)
- with Leland H. Hartwell, John J. Hopfield, Andrew W. Murray: From molecular to modular cell biology. In Nature 402, 913-917 (2 December 1999)
- with N. Barkai: Robustness in simple biochemical networks. In Nature 387, 913-917 (26 June 1997)
- with M. Dogterom, F. Verde and E. Karsenti: "Control of microtubule dynamics and length by cyclin A- and cyclin B-dependent kinases in Xenopus egg extracts". In J. Cell Biol. 1992 118:1097-108.
