= Halicin =

Drug and first antibiotic identified by a deep learning algorithm

Clinical data
- Trade names: Halicin

Legal status
- Legal status: US: Investigational New Drug

Identifiers
- IUPAC name: 5-[(5-Nitro-1,3-thiazol-2-yl)sulfanyl]-1,3,4-thiadiazol-2-amine
- CAS Number: 40045-50-9
- PubChem CID: 11837140
- ChemSpider: 10011699
- UNII: Y4KQC5P9B2
- ChEBI: CHEBI:146227
- ChEMBL: ChEMBL510038
- CompTox Dashboard (EPA): DTXSID70474254

Chemical and physical data
- Formula: C_{5}H_{3}N_{5}O_{2}S_{3}
- Molar mass: 261.29 g·mol^{−1}
- 3D model (JSmol): Interactive image
- SMILES: C1=C(SC(=N1)SC2=NN=C(S2)N)[N+](=O)[O-]
- InChI: InChI=1S/C5H3N5O2S3/c6-3-8-9-5(14-3)15-4-7-1-2(13-4)10(11)12/h1H,(H2,6,8); Key:NQQBNZBOOHHVQP-UHFFFAOYSA-N

Halicin (SU-3327) is an experimental drug that acts as an enzyme inhibitor of c-Jun N-terminal kinase (JNK). Originally, it was researched for the treatment of diabetes, but development was discontinued for this application due to poor results in testing. In 2019, this molecule was found by an artificial intelligence (AI) model to show antibiotic properties against a number of bacteria.

== History ==
Halicin was previously known as SU-3327, developed by a group of researchers from Burnham Institute for Medical Research, United States in 2009 for investigations into diabetes treatment. Researchers named the molecule after the fictional artificial intelligence system Hal from 2001: A Space Odyssey.

=== Antibiotic properties ===
Halicin was identified by artificial intelligence researchers, including bioengineer James Collins, at the MIT Jameel Clinic in 2019 using an in silico deep learning approach, as a likely broad-spectrum antibiotic. The process took just three days. This likelihood was verified by in vitro cell culture testing, followed by in vivo tests in mice. It showed activity against drug-resistant strains of Clostridiodes difficile, Acinetobacter baumannii, and Mycobacterium tuberculosis, with an unusual mechanism of action involving the sequestration of iron inside the bacterial cells, which thereby interferes with their ability to regulate the pH balance across the cell membrane properly. Since this is a different mode of action from most antibiotics, halicin retained activity against bacterial strains resistant to many commonly used drugs.

Preliminary studies suggest that halicin kills bacteria by disrupting their ability to maintain an electrochemical gradient across their cell membranes. This gradient is necessary, among other functions, to produce adenosine triphosphate (ATP, molecules that cells use to store and transfer energy), so if the gradient breaks down, the cells die. This type of killing mechanism could be difficult for bacteria to develop resistance to.
