= Anantha P. Chandrakasan =

American engineer

Anantha Chandrakasan
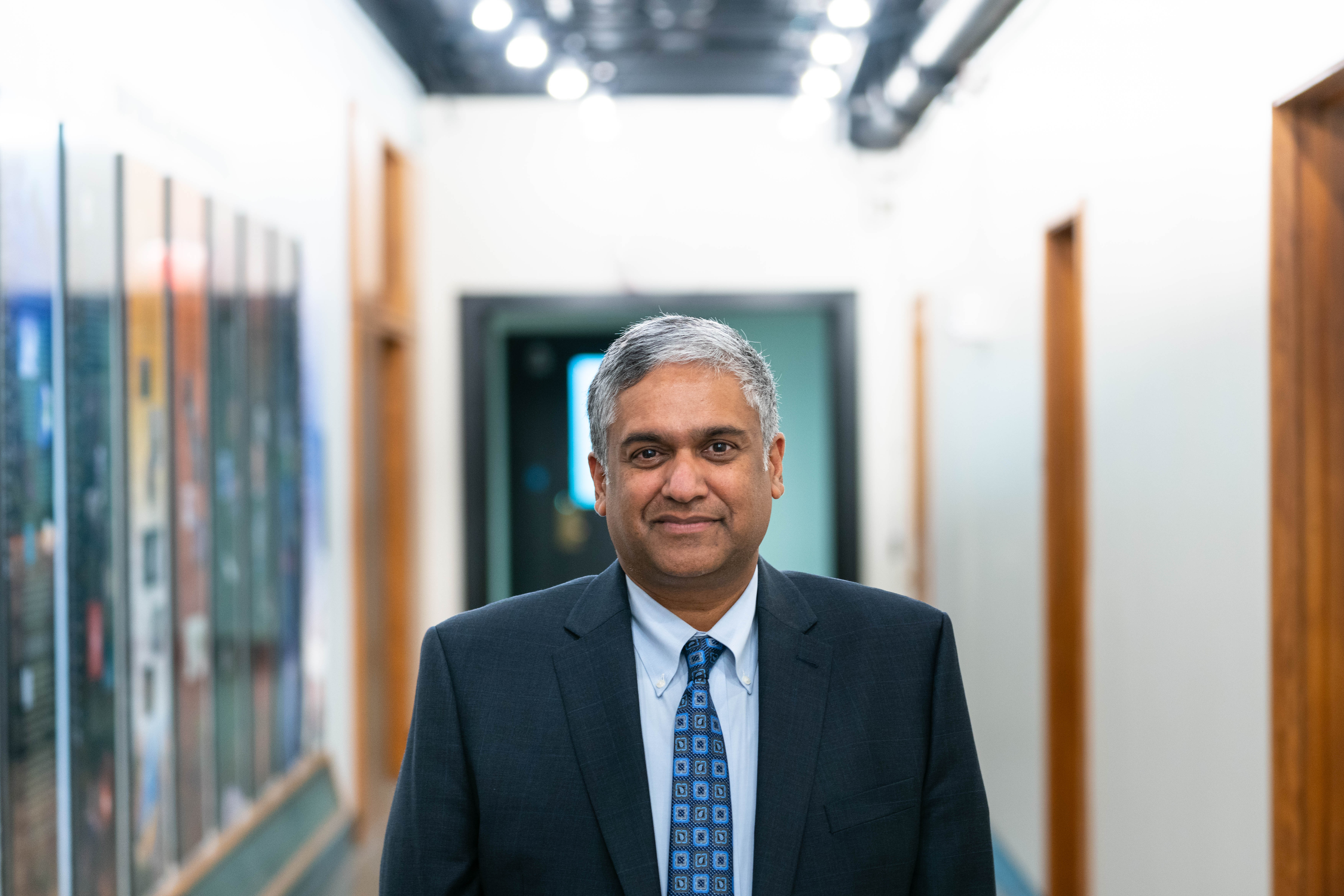

14th Provost of the Massachusetts Institute of Technology
- Incumbent
- Assumed office 1 July 2025
- Preceded by: Cynthia Barnhart

Personal details
- Born: September 1968 (age 57) Chennai, India
- Education: University of California, Berkeley (BS, MS, PhD)
- Website: Official website
- Scientific career
- Awards: IEEE Donald O. Pederson Award in Solid-State Circuits (2013)
- Fields: Electrical engineering Computer science
- Workplaces: Massachusetts Institute of Technology
- Thesis: Low Power Digital CMOS Digital Design (1994)
- Doctoral advisor: Robert W. Brodersen

Anantha P. Chandrakasan is the provost and Vannevar Bush Professor of Electrical Engineering and Computer Science at the Massachusetts Institute of Technology.

He is the Executive Senior Advisor of the MIT Climate and Sustainability Consortium and chair of the MIT AI Hardware Program, and co-chair of the MIT–IBM Computing Research Lab, the MIT and Accenture Convergence Initiative for Industry and Technology, and the Tata-MIT Alliance. He also serves as head of the MIT Health and Life Sciences Collaborative (MIT HEALS) and the MIT Generative AI Impact Consortium (MGAIC), and co-chair of the MIT Human Insight Collaborative (MITHIC) and MIT-GE Vernova Energy and Climate Alliance.

== Early life and education ==
Born in Chennai, India, Chandrakasan moved to the United States during high school. His mother, a biochemist, was a Fulbright Scholar. He received a Bachelor of Science in 1989, a Master of Science in 1990, and a PhD in electrical engineering and computer sciences in 1994 from the University of California, Berkeley.

== Career ==
In 1994, Chandrakasan joined the Department of Electrical Engineering and Computer Science (EECS) at MIT. He was the Director of the MIT Microsystems Technology Laboratories from 2006 to 2011, and head of the EECS department from 2011 to 2017. In his role as head of EECS, he launched programs such as a year-long independent research program called "SuperUROP" that supported students doing publication-quality research; an annual event the Rising Stars program that brought together graduate and postdoc women to share advice for advancing academic careers; and an independent activities period (IAP) class called StartMIT that introduces students to entrepreneurship and connects students and postdocs with industrial innovation leaders.

In 2016, Chandrakasan led The Engine Working Groups to guide the development of Institute policies and procedures for engaging with The Engine. In 2017, he was appointed dean of MIT's School of Engineering. As the Dean of Engineering, Chandrakasan has led or contributed to the creation of a number of initiatives including The Abdul Latif Jameel Clinic for Machine Learning in Health (Jameel Clinic), the MIT-IBM AI Watson Lab (now the MIT-IBM Computing Research Lab), The MIT Quest for Intelligence, the MIT-Sensetime Alliance, the MIT Stephen A. Schwarzman College of Computing, the MIT-Takeda Program, and the MIT and Accenture Convergence Initiative for Industry and Technology.

Chandrakasan has overseen the development and launch of MIT Human Insight Collaborative (MITHIC), the MIT Health and Life Sciences Collaborative (MIT HEALS), the MIT Generative AI Impact Consortium (MGAIC), and the MIT Initiative for New Manufacturing (INM) as well as the MIT GE-Vernova Energy and Climate Alliance. He has oversight of these initiatives.

=== Research and publications ===
His research focuses on the energy efficiency of electronic circuits. Early on in his research career, he worked on low-power chips for portable computers, which helped lead to the development of technology in small, energy-constrained devices like smartphones. His paper titled "Low-power CMOS digital design" published in the IEEE Journal of Solid-State Circuits (April 1992) is recognized as one of the most cited papers in the journal.

Chandrakasan leads the MIT Energy-Efficient Circuits and Systems Group, which works on a variety of projects such as ultra-low power biomedical devices, energy-efficient processors, wireless authentication tags. The group also works on projects that involving circuit design, wireless charging, security hardware, and energy harvesting in Internet of Things devices.

He is a co-author of Low Power Digital CMOS Design (Kluwer Academic Publishers, 1995), Digital Integrated Circuits (Pearson Prentice-Hall, 2003, 2nd edition), and Sub-threshold Design for Ultra-Low Power Systems (Springer 2006).

== Affiliations, awards, and service ==
In 2015, Chandrakasan was elected a member of the National Academy of Engineering for the development of low-power circuit and system design methods.

=== IEEE International Solid-state Circuits ===
Chandrakasan has held a number of roles at the IEEE International Solid-state Circuits Conference:

- Chair, ISSCC Signal Processing Subcommittee, 1999–2001
- Vice Chair, ISSCC Program, 2002
- Chair, ISSCC Program, 2003
- Chair, ISSCC Technology-Directions Subcommittee, 2004–2009
- Vice-chair, ISSCC Conference, 2009
- Chair, ISSCC Student Forum Committee (now called the Student Research Preview Committee), 2009
- Chair, ISSCC Conference, 2010–2018
- Senior Technical Advisor, 2019–2023
- Plenary Selection Chair, 2024
- Steering Committee Chair, 2025-current

=== Board affiliations ===
- Member, Board of The Engine, 2016–2021
- Member, Board of Trustees of the Perkins School for the Blind, 2018–2022
- Member, Board of Analog Devices, Inc., 2019–2024
- Member, SMART Governing Board, 2017–present

=== Honors and awards ===
- 1995 IBM Faculty Development Award
- 1995 NSF Career Development Award
- 1996, 1997 National Semiconductor Faculty Development Awards
- 1997 IEEE Electron Devices Society's Paul Rappaport Award
- 2004 elected fellow of the Institute of Electrical and Electronics Engineers (IEEE)
- 2007 ISSCC Beatrice Winner Award for Editorial Excellence
- 2007/8/9 ISSCC Jack Kilby Award for Outstanding Student Paper
- 2009 Semiconductor Industry Association University Researcher Award
- 2013 IEEE Donald O. Pederson Award in Solid-State Circuits
- 2015 Member of the National Academy of Engineering
- 2016 Honorary doctorate from KU Leuven
- 2017 UC Berkeley EE Distinguished Alumni Award
- 2019 IEEE Solid-State Circuits Society Distinguished Service Award
- 2019 Member of the American Academy of Arts and Sciences
- 2020 Association for Computing Machinery Fellow
- 2022 IEEE Mildred Dresselhaus Medal
- 2024 Honorary doctorate from National Technical University of Athens
