= The Audacious Project =

Funding initiative established by TED

The Audacious Project is a collaborative funding initiative between TED and non-profits that convenes funders and social entrepreneurs in order to scale solutions to the world's most urgent challenges. In 2018, The TED Prize was recast as The Audacious Project.

== Details ==
The TED Prize was a prize commissioned by the American media organization TED Conferences. It ran from 2005 to 2017, culminating in a prize amount of $1 million. In 2018, The TED Prize was recast as The Audacious Project.

TED described the change as:

a new model to launch big, inspiring ideas with the potential to affect millions of lives. Housed at TED, the Audacious Project brings together a powerful coalition of nonprofit organizations and individual donors with members of the public, allowing them to pool resources and work together in service of change-making ideas. An ambitious scale-up of the TED Prize's mission, The Audacious Project will increase impact by many orders of magnitude.

The Audacious Project is supported by The Bridgespan Group, but lists many more organizations as its partners, including Virgin Unite and the Gates Foundation. According to TED, the project has helped participants raise $4.6 billion USD in funding.

== Winners ==
Unlike the original TED Prize, The Audacious Project awards a number of different winners each year. The nomenclature has also changed from 'winners' to 'Big Ideas'.

The Audacious Project Big Ideas
Year	Big Ideas	Organization
2018	What if we hit the brakes on climate change by tracking gas emissions from space?	Environmental Defense Fund
	What if a million Black women launched a health revolution?	GirlTrek
	What if we digitally empowered community health workers to make care available to all?	Living Goods + Last Mile Health
	What if we supported millions of African farmers in growing more food — for themselves and the world?	One Acre Fund
	What if we eliminated a disease that has blinded people for thousands of years?	Sightsavers
	What if we ended the injustice of automatic jail time for those who can’t afford bail?	The Bail Project
	What if we explored the ocean’s vast twilight zone, teeming with undiscovered life?	Woods Hole Oceanographic Institution
2019	What if science could eliminate racial bias in policing?	Center for Policing Equity
	What if we could empower more than one million girls to enter the classroom?	Educate Girls
	What if we could harness the power of proteins to create the next generation of medicines and materials?	Institute for Design Protein
	What if plants can help slow climate change?	Salk Institute for Biological Studies
	What if we could massively reduce disease from parasitic worms in Africa?	The End Fund
	What if island nations’ debt could be restructured to protect vast areas of ocean?	The Nature Conservancy
	What if we could eliminate child sexual abuse from the internet?	Thorn
	What if every child came to school on day one ready to learn?	Upstart Project
2020	What if we could harness AI to tackle the looming antibiotic resistance crisis?	The Collins Lab and MIT Jameel Clinic
	Decoding the communication of whales with advanced machine learning and state-of-the-art robotics	Project CETI
	A global surveillance network to stop the next pandemic before it starts	ACEGID + Broad Institute
	Lifting the world’s poorest people out of ultra-poverty	BRAC
	Delivering mental health support to anyone, anywhere via text message	Crisis Text Line
	Supporting humanitarian response by mapping areas home to one billion people	Humanitarian OpenStreetMap Team
	Supporting millions of African farmers to lift themselves and their communities out of poverty	One Acre Fund
	Leveraging medicine donation to make life-saving prescriptions more affordable for all Americans	SIRUM
2021	Strengthening local election administration in the US	Center for Tech and Civic Life
	Harnessing people centered technology to transform the US social safety net	Code for America
	Ending polluting road transport in time to avoid a climate crisis	Drive Electric Campaign
	Building critical mental health support and access in Central America's Northern Triangle	Glasswing International
	Unlocking legal rights so that refugees can resettle safely	International Refugee Assistance Project
	Giving smallholder farmers the power to invest in themselves	Myagro
	Training family caregiver to help their loved ones heal	Noora Health
	Securing land for Indigenous Peoples - for justice and our climate	Tenure Facility
	Integrating permafrost into our global solution for climate change	Woodwell Climate Research Center
2022	Accelerating scientific discovery and the development of COVID-19 vaccines and treatments	Fast Grants
	Remotely delivering cash support to the world's most poor during the pandemic	GiveDirectly
	Scaling emergency relief to Black communities hardest hit by COVID-19	Harlem Children's Zone
	Rapidly increasing the scale, speed, and effectiveness of contact tracing in the US	Partners In Health
	A virtual mentoring platform to better equip health workers around the world in the fight against COVID-19	Project Echo
	Helping US cities provide immediate food relief during the pandemic while supporting local restaurants	World Central Kitchen
2023	Helping girls in Sub-Saharan Africa thrive in school - and beyond	Camfed
	Scaling next-generation solutions to save ancient forests	Canopy
	Clearing arrest and conviction records to unlock opportunity	Clean Slate Initiative
	Safeguarding the ocean by making human activity at sea visible	Global Fishing Watch
	Engineering microbiomes with CRISPR to improve our climate and health	Innovative Genomics Institute
	Unlocking life-enhancing benefits for domestic migrant workers	Jan Sahas
	Accelerating renewable energy for a climate-secure future	Renew2030
	Accelerating locally-led land restoration of Africa's vital landscapes and forests	Restore Local
	Transforming foster care in the US through the power of lived experience	Think of Us
	Increasing equitable access to high-quality contraceptive care	Upstream USA
2024	Protecting humanity by monitoring AI for dangerous capabilities	METR and RAND
	Finding truth and justice for the missing through forensic technology	Equipo Argentino de Antropología Forense
	Leveraging AI to repurpose generic drugs and save patients' lives	Every Cure
	Creating a blueprint to fight classroom hunger across Africa	Food4Education
	Pulling the emergency brake on global warming through methane mitigation	Global Methane Hub
	Building a lifeline for the world's coral reefs	Great Barrier Reef Foundation
	Investing in refugee communities through entrepreneurship	Inkomoko
	Protecting the world's tropical forests and promoting sustainable land use with free, detailed maps	MapBiomas
	Transforming US public safety through resident-powered crime prevention	The Community Based Public Safety Collective and the Alliance for Safety and Justice
	Engaging communities across the US to redesign their schools	Transcend
2025	The world's first high-utility virtual cell, an AI-model accelerating medical breakthroughs	Arc Institute
	An initiative to close the college-to-career gap for low-income and first-generation college students in the United States	Braven
	A rugged learning solution that empowers children across Sub-Saharan Africa to achieve their full potential	Imagine Worldwide
	An initiative to prevent unsafe abortion by removing systemic, legal, and social barriers to care	Ipas
	An ambitious plan to reduce plastic production and foster a reuse-based circular economy	Plastic Solutions Fund
	A plan to combat lead poisoning at global scale and protect 500 million children	Pure Earth
	A proven prevention model redefining how the United States confronts homelessness by acting before in happens	Destination: Home
	An initiative to transform maritime trade from stern to bow, breaking dependency on fossil fuels	Solutions for Our Climate
	Intercepting 1/3 of river plastic before it reaches oceans	The Ocean Cleanup
	Stigma-free care empowering adolescent girls in Sub-Saharan Africa against unintended pregnancy, HIV, and sexual violence	Tiko
